= Typhoon Soudelor =

Pacific typhoon in 2015

Typhoon Soudelor (Hanna)
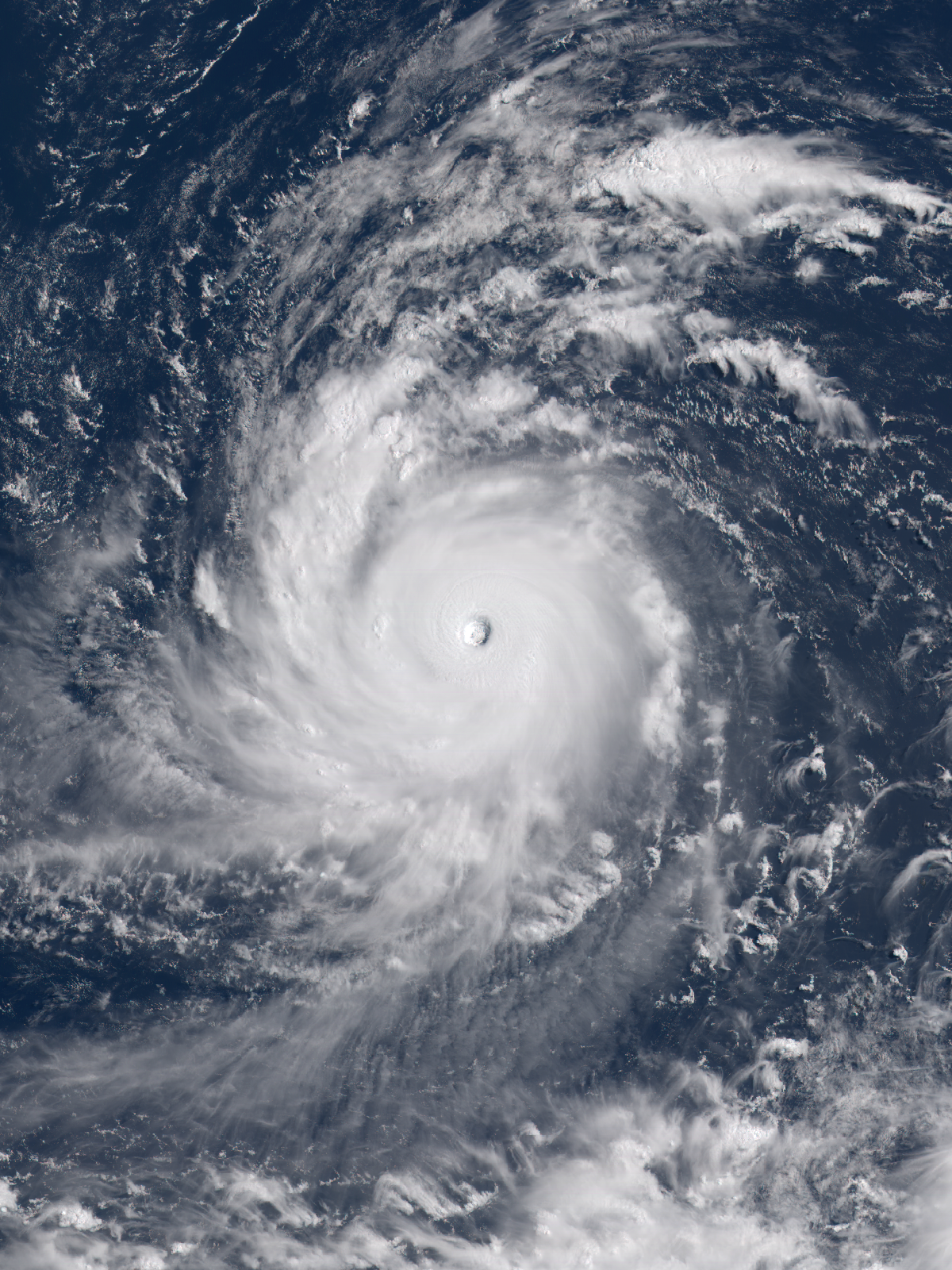
- Soudelor at peak intensity on August 4

Meteorological history
- Formed: July 29, 2015
- Dissipated: August 12, 2015

Violent typhoon
- 10-minute sustained (JMA)
- Highest winds: 215 km/h (130 mph)
- Lowest pressure: 900 hPa (mbar); 26.58 inHg

Category 5-equivalent super typhoon
- 1-minute sustained (SSHWS/JTWC)
- Highest winds: 285 km/h (180 mph)
- Lowest pressure: 907 hPa (mbar); 26.78 inHg

Overall effects
- Fatalities: 59 total
- Damage: $4.09 billion (2015 USD)
- Areas affected: Mariana Islands; Philippines; Taiwan; China; South Korea; Japan
- IBTrACS
- Part of the 2015 Pacific typhoon season

Typhoon Soudelor, (Note: The name Soudelor (Pohnpeian: Sau Deleur, [sʲɐuteleur]) was contributed by the Federated States of Micronesia and refers to legendary Pohnpeian chiefs during the Saudeleur Dynasty in Pohnpeian.) known in the Philippines as Super Typhoon Hanna, was the third most intense tropical cyclone worldwide in 2015 after Hurricane Patricia and Cyclone Pam as well as the strongest tropical cyclone of the 2015 Pacific typhoon season. Soudelor had severe impacts in the Northern Mariana Islands, Taiwan, and eastern China, resulting in 40 confirmed fatalities. Lesser effects were felt in Japan, South Korea and the Philippines. The thirteenth named storm of the annual typhoon season, Soudelor formed as a tropical depression near Pohnpei on July 29. The system strengthened slowly at first before entering a period of rapid intensification on August 2. Soudelor made landfall on Saipan later that day, causing extensive damage. Owing to favorable environmental conditions, the typhoon further deepened and reached its peak intensity with ten-minute maximum sustained winds of 215 km/h (130 mph) and a central atmospheric pressure of 900 hPa (mbar; 26.58 inHg) on August 3. The Joint Typhoon Warning Center assessed one-minute sustained winds at 285 km/h (180 mph), making Soudelor a Category 5-equivalent super typhoon. Steady weakening ensued thereafter as the storm moved generally west-northwest. Soudelor made landfall over Hualien, Taiwan, late on August 7 and emerged over in the Taiwan Strait early the next day. The typhoon soon moved inland over eastern China and degraded to a tropical depression by August 9.

Soudelor was the second worst storm to strike Saipan in the Northern Mariana Islands in nearly 30 years (following Typhoon Yutu of 2018). Hundreds of homes were damaged or destroyed and power was expected to take a month to restore. Two people died in Guam due to rip currents. In Taiwan, torrential rains and destructive winds caused widespread damage and disruptions. A record-breaking 4.85 million households lost power on the island. At least 8 people died and 420 others sustained injury there; a ninth person died in the storm's aftermath. Portions of eastern China saw their heaviest rains in 100 years, resulting in deadly floods and landslides. Typhoon Soudelor killed 45 people in eastern China after parts of the country were hit by the heaviest rains in a century. Total economic losses were counted to be ¥24.627 billion (US$3.97 billion).

== Meteorological history ==
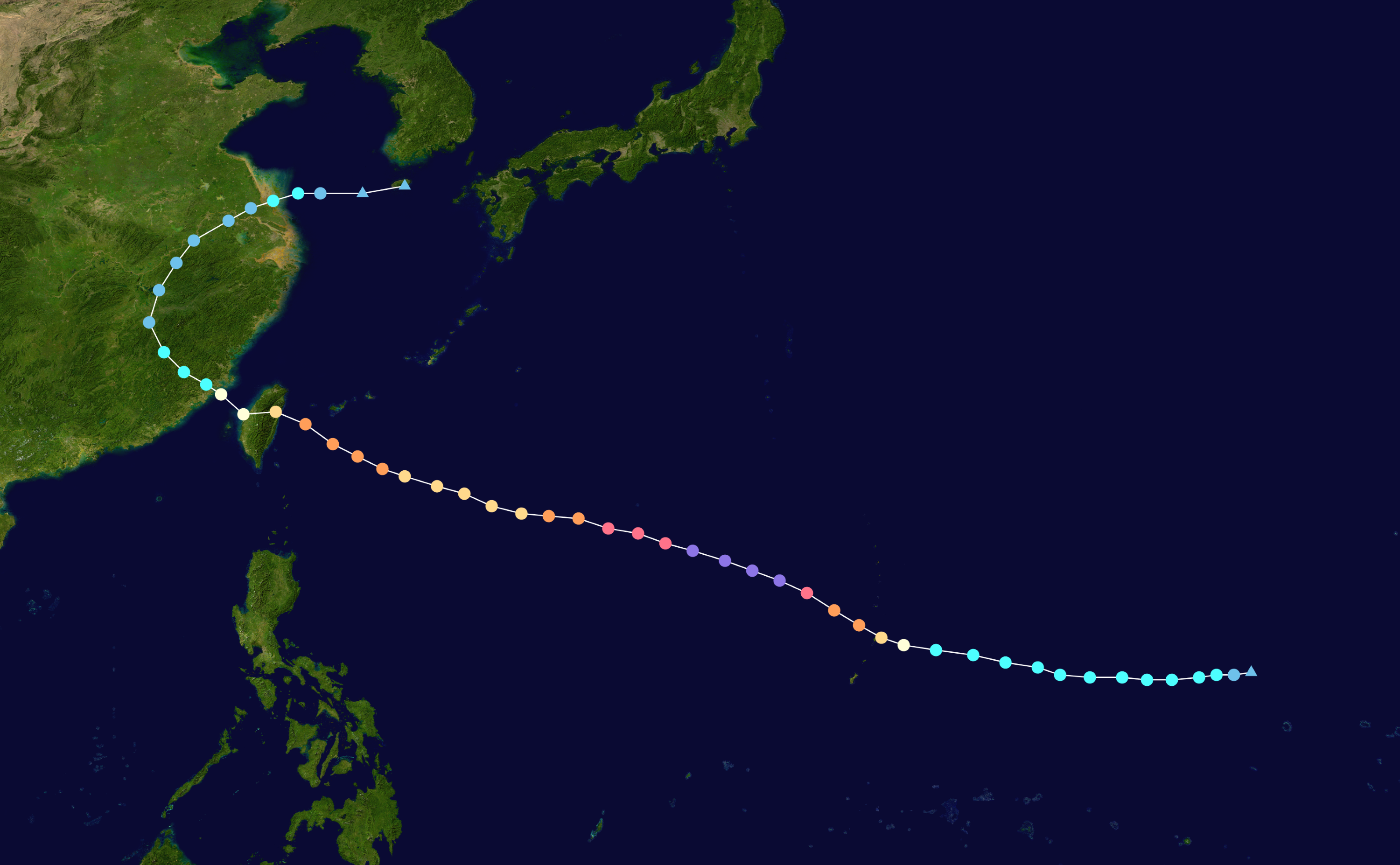
Map plotting the storm's track and intensity, according to the Saffir–Simpson scale Map key Saffir–Simpson scale Tropical depression (≤38 mph, ≤62 km/h) Tropical storm (39–73 mph, 63–118 km/h) Category 1 (74–95 mph, 119–153 km/h) Category 2 (96–110 mph, 154–177 km/h) Category 3 (111–129 mph, 178–208 km/h) Category 4 (130–156 mph, 209–251 km/h) Category 5 (≥157 mph, ≥252 km/h) Unknown Storm type Tropical cyclone Subtropical cyclone Extratropical cyclone, remnant low, tropical disturbance, or monsoon depression

On July 28, 2015, the Joint Typhoon Warning Center (JTWC) (Note: The Joint Typhoon Warning Center is a joint United States Navy – United States Air Force task force that issues tropical cyclone warnings for the western Pacific Ocean and other regions.) began monitoring a tropical disturbance about 415 km (258 mi) north of Kwajalein Atoll in the Marshall Islands. The system featured a developing low level circulation accompanied by deep convection. Moving generally west under the influence of a subtropical ridge, the disturbance gradually organized amid favorable environmental conditions. A tropical upper tropospheric trough (TUTT) cell enhanced upper-level outflow, offsetting the negative effects of moderate wind shear; high sea surface temperatures and ocean heat content provided ample energy for further development. At 14:30 UTC on July 29, the JTWC issued a Tropical Cyclone Formation Alert for the system. Several hours later, the Japan Meteorological Agency (JMA) (Note: The Japan Meteorological Agency is the official Regional Specialized Meteorological Center for the western Pacific Ocean.) began monitoring the system as a weak tropical depression; the agency began full advisories on the system at 00:00 UTC on July 30. The JTWC followed suit later that day, designating the system as Tropical Depression 13W. The cyclone achieved tropical storm intensity by 12:00 UTC, at which time it was assigned the name Soudelor. A central dense overcast developed over the circulation center shortly thereafter.

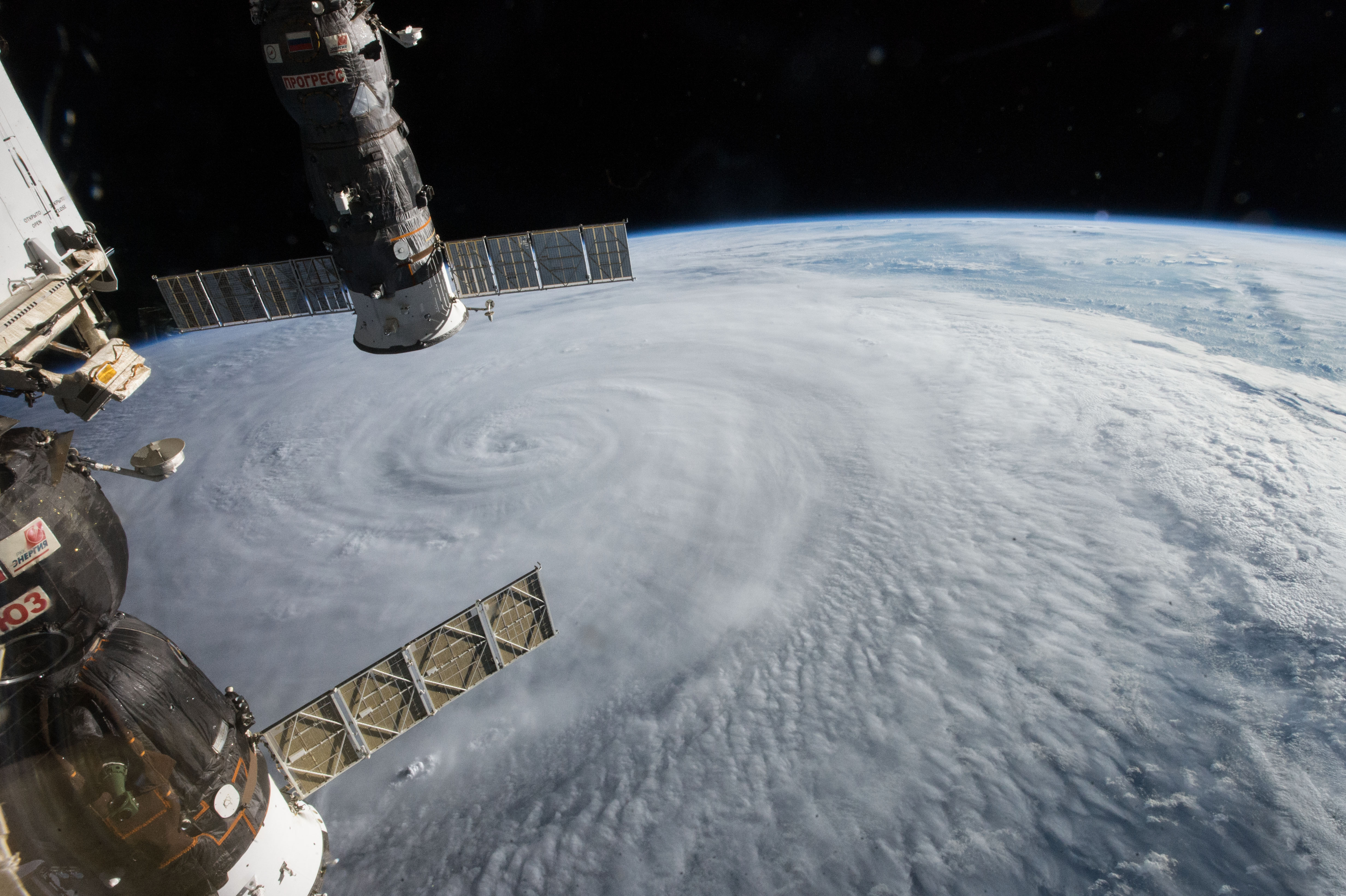
Satellite image of Soudelor taken from the International Space Station on August 5. The Soyuz TMA-17M (bottom left) and the Progress 60 (top left) cargo craft are visible

Some structural degradation took place on July 31 owing to subsidence from a TUTT cell to the north. Following a retreat of the TUTT cell northward, Soudelor's convective structure improved with well-defined banding features wrapping into the circulation by August 1. The organizing storm, with a redeveloped central dense overcast, soon entered a region favoring rapid intensification, including low wind shear, sea surface temperatures of 31–32 °C (88–90 °F) and high ocean heat content. Therefore, the JMA upgraded Soudelor to a severe tropical storm by 18:00 UTC. Rapid intensification ensued on August 2 as the storm approached the Northern Mariana Islands with both agencies classifying Soudelor as a typhoon. The typhoon developed an unusually small eye only 8 km (5.0 mi) in diameter, among the smallest ever observed in a tropical cyclone. At 14:54 UTC, Soudelor made landfall along the southern coast of Saipan.

After undergoing an eyewall replacement cycle, Soudelor continued rapid intensification, reaching peak intensity on August 3. The JMA estimated peak ten-minute maximum sustained winds of 215 km/h (134 mph) and a minimum central pressure of 900 hPa (27 inHg), while the JTWC estimated peak one-minute maximum sustained winds of 285 km/h (177 mph), classifying Soudelor as a Category 5-equivalent super typhoon. Intensity leveled off thereafter, and after maintaining Category 5 intensity for 24 hours, Soudelor was downgraded to a Category 4 super typhoon late on August 4. On August 5, PAGASA reported that the Typhoon Soudelor entered the Philippine Area of Responsibility assigning the name Hanna. Soudelor weakened further to a Category 2-equivalent typhoon and stayed at that intensity for a day. On August 7, the typhoon reintensified to reach a secondary peak as a Category 3-equivalent typhoon, and later that day, Typhoon Soudelor made landfall over Xiulin, Hualien in Taiwan at 20:40 UTC on August 7 (04:40 TST on August 8), and it arrived in the Taiwan Strait from Taixi, Yunlin around 03:00 UTC (11:00 TST) on August 8. Around 14:10 UTC (22:10 CST) on the same day, Soudelor made landfall over Xiuyu District, Putian, Fujian in China as a Category 1-equivalent typhoon. Quickly degrading, Soudelor moved erratically northwest. 24 hours after landfall, Soudelor was downgraded to a depression, before becoming extratropical six hours later The remnants re-looped eastward, before briefly re-attaining gale-force winds as it moved offshore near Yancheng, Jiangsu. The remnants were last noted on August 13, affecting Kyushu and Chūgoku region.

== Impact ==
=== Mariana Islands ===
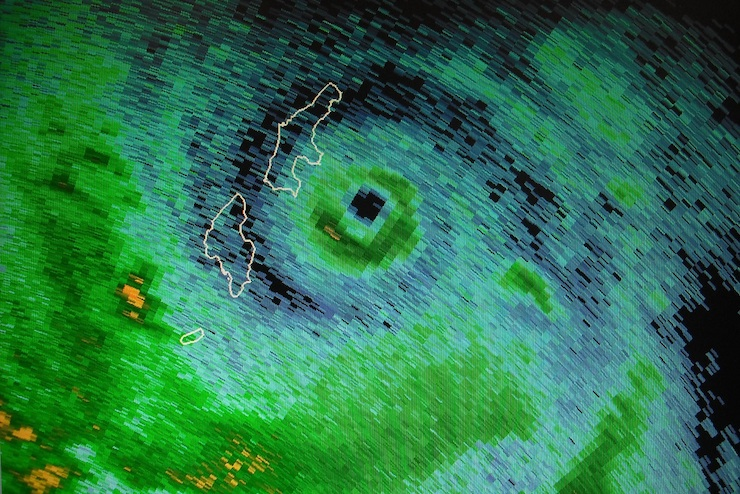
NEXRAD imagery of Typhoon Soudelor approaching Saipan on August 2, 2015

Typhoon Soudelor passed directly over Saipan on August 2 as an intensifying Category 2 equivalent storm according to the JTWC, causing widespread damage on the island. Post-storm damage surveys determined Soudelor to have been substantially stronger at landfall: a Category 4-equivalent with sustained winds of 215 km/h (134 mph) with gusts in excess of 260 km/h (160 mph). The National Weather Service's anemometer at Saipan International Airport broke after recording a gust of 146 km/h (91 mph). The winds downed numerous trees and power lines, leaving much of the island without power and rendering roads impassible. In some areas, cars were flipped over by the force of the wind. The island's power plant lost part of its roof and was flooded. Damage to the island's electrical infrastructure was tremendous, with 150 power poles and 114 transformers damaged or destroyed. A total of 464 residents sought refuge in public shelters. Acting Governor Ralph DLG Torres declared "a state of disaster and significant emergency". Philip Dauterman of the Commonwealth Health Center in Saipan likened damage to that caused by Typhoon Pongsona which struck Guam in December 2002. In addition, John Hirsh from the American Red Cross said that Soudelor is the most damaging cyclone to hit Saipan since Typhoon Kim in 1986 struck the island nearly thirty years prior.

Initial assessments by the Emergency Operations Center indicate that 384 homes were destroyed. A separate assessment by the American Red Cross showed 808 homes affected. Of this total, 158 were destroyed, 296 sustained major damage, and 354 were affected or sustained minor damage. Total damage exceeded US$21 million (2015 USD) on Saipan. Forty people were injured across the island. On August 8 and 9, two people drowned in separate rip current incidents in western Guam.

The local power company, Commonwealth Utilities Corp., stated they only had 77 replacement power poles and no transformers. Repairs to the electric grid, water supply network, and wastewater systems were expected to take three to four weeks. Three Mobil gas stations re-opened on August 4 for first responders and emergency services. Relief supplies from Guam and Hawaii were sent to Saipan that day. Members of the Guam National Guard, Guam Power Authority, and the Coast Guard also provided assistance. On August 6, United States President Barack Obama declared the Northern Mariana Islands a federal disaster area, allowing residents to receive government aid. Saipan was granted individual assistance while Tinian and Rota received public assistance. By September, the Federal Emergency Management Agency approved US$25.9 million in aid to residents of Saipan.

=== Japan ===
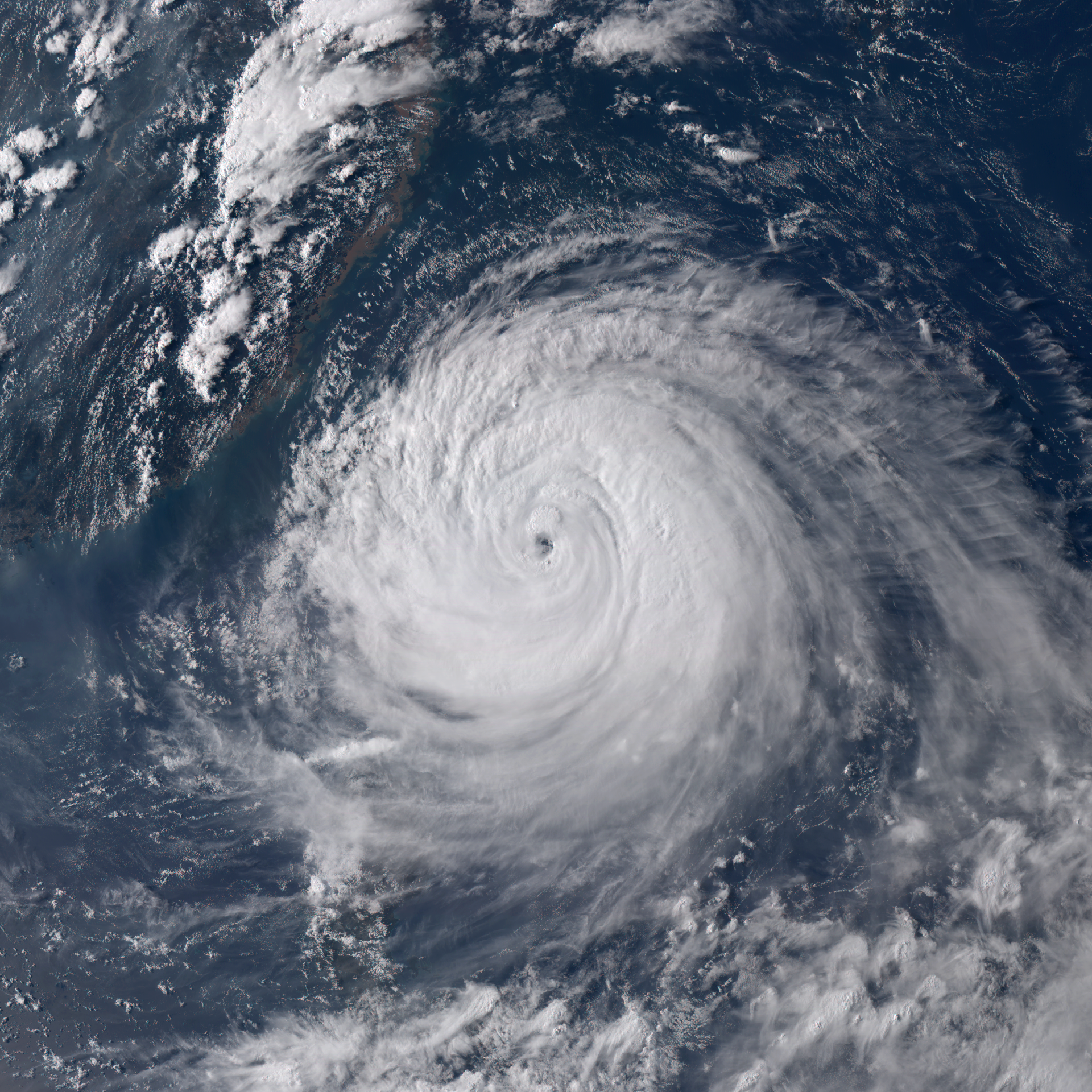
Typhoon Soudelor south of the Ryukyu Islands and approaching Taiwan, on August 7.

Prior to striking Taiwan, the circulation of Typhoon Soudelor battered Japan's southern Ryukyu Islands with typhoon-force winds. Sustained winds on Yonaguni island reached 163 km/h (101 mph) with concurrent gusts to 233 km/h (145 mph), the strongest winds recorded in relation to the storm throughout its path. Ishigaki Island saw a peak gust of 198 km/h (123 mph). Farther north at Kadena Air Base on Okinawa Island, gusts reached 84 km/h (52 mph). Heavy rains accompanied these winds, with Yonaguni reporting 451 mm (17.74 in) during the storm's passage. Structural impact was relatively minor, mainly confined to damaged roofs on Yonaguni island. Three people sustained minor injuries in the region. Losses to agriculture, forestry, and fisheries across the Yaeyama District reached ¥360 million (US$2.9 million). A total of 6,748 hectares (16,670 acres) of crops sustained damage. In Miyako-jima, crops sustained significant damage from salt; relatively little rain coupled with strong winds allowed sea spray to travel farther inland than normal. Preliminary estimates placed losses at ¥94.52 million (US$761,000). On August 10, a family of four was swept out to sea near Irabu-jima by residual swells from the typhoon; three drowned while the fourth, an 8-year-old girl, was rescued.

=== Taiwan ===
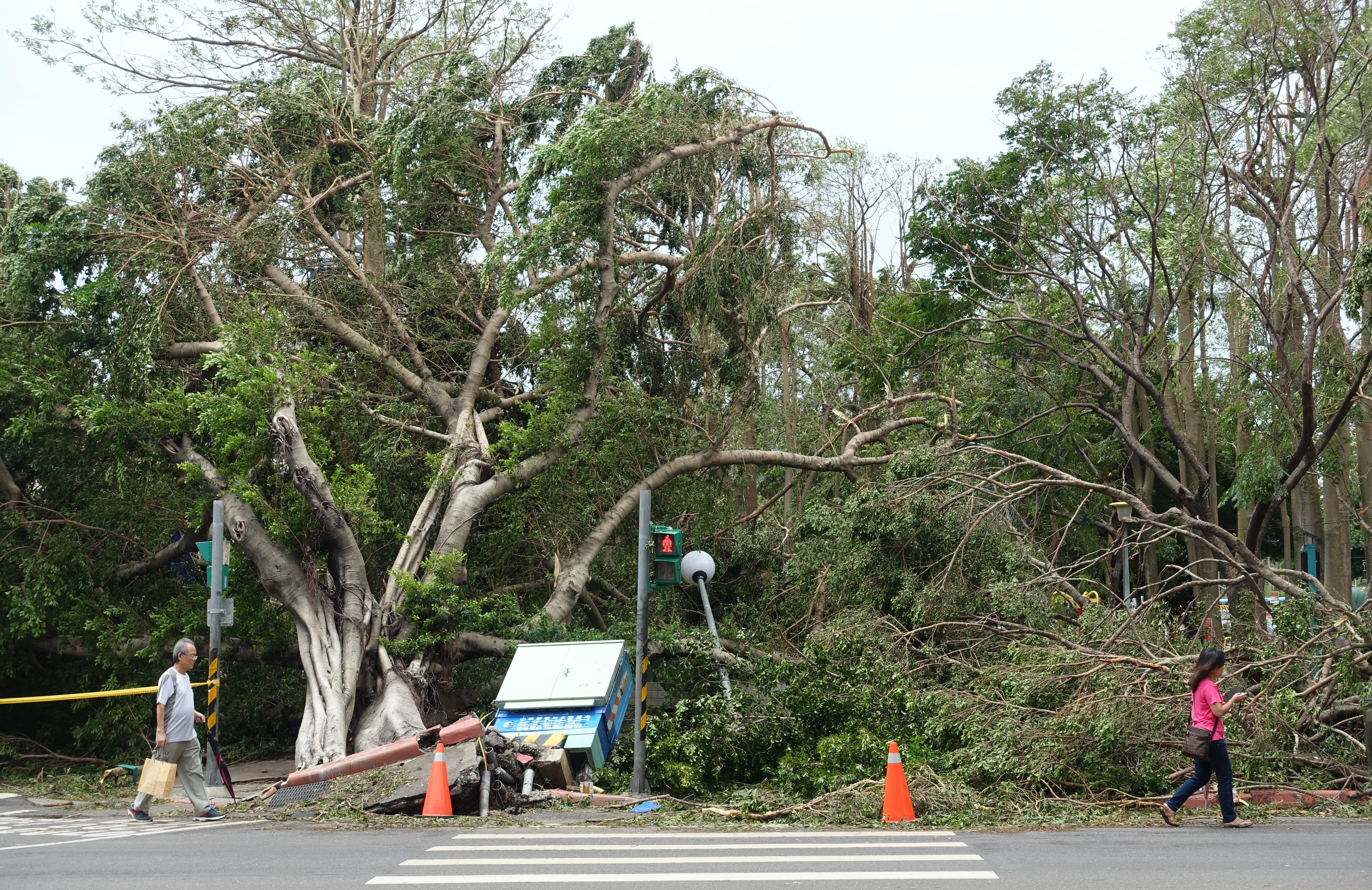
Tree damage in Taipei following Soudelor on August 8

On August 6, four people in Su'ao, Yilan were swept away while watching waves. One person, a child, survived; two others are confirmed dead, and the fourth is still missing. By August 10, eight fatalities had been confirmed, while four others were reported missing. Additionally, 420 people sustained injuries. All 279 domestic flights were canceled on August 8, as well as at least 37 international flights.

The center of the storm made landfall in eastern Taiwan at 04:40 a.m. local time on August 8. By mid-morning, Soudelor had maximum sustained winds of 173 km/h (107 mph; 93 kn), according to Taiwan's Central Weather Bureau (CWB). Northern and mountainous areas of Taiwan saw the strongest winds, with Pengjia Islet reporting sustained winds of 150 km/h (93 mph) and a peak gust of 211 km/h (131 mph). A gust of 230 km/h (143 mph) was reported in Su'ao; however, this value was later retracted by the CWB due to possible accuracy concerns. Taoyuan International Airport in Taoyuan reported a gust of 150 km/h (93 mph). These winds caused Taipei 101's tuned mass damper to sway a record 100 cm (39 in). Taiping Mountain in eastern Taiwan's Yilan County saw the heaviest rains from the typhoon, with accumulations peaking at 1,334 mm (52.52 in). Rainfall in the Wulai District reached 722 mm (28.4 in) in 24 hours, the second-highest on record behind Typhoon Matsa in 2005. Twelve-hour accumulations amounted to a record 632 mm (24.9 in).

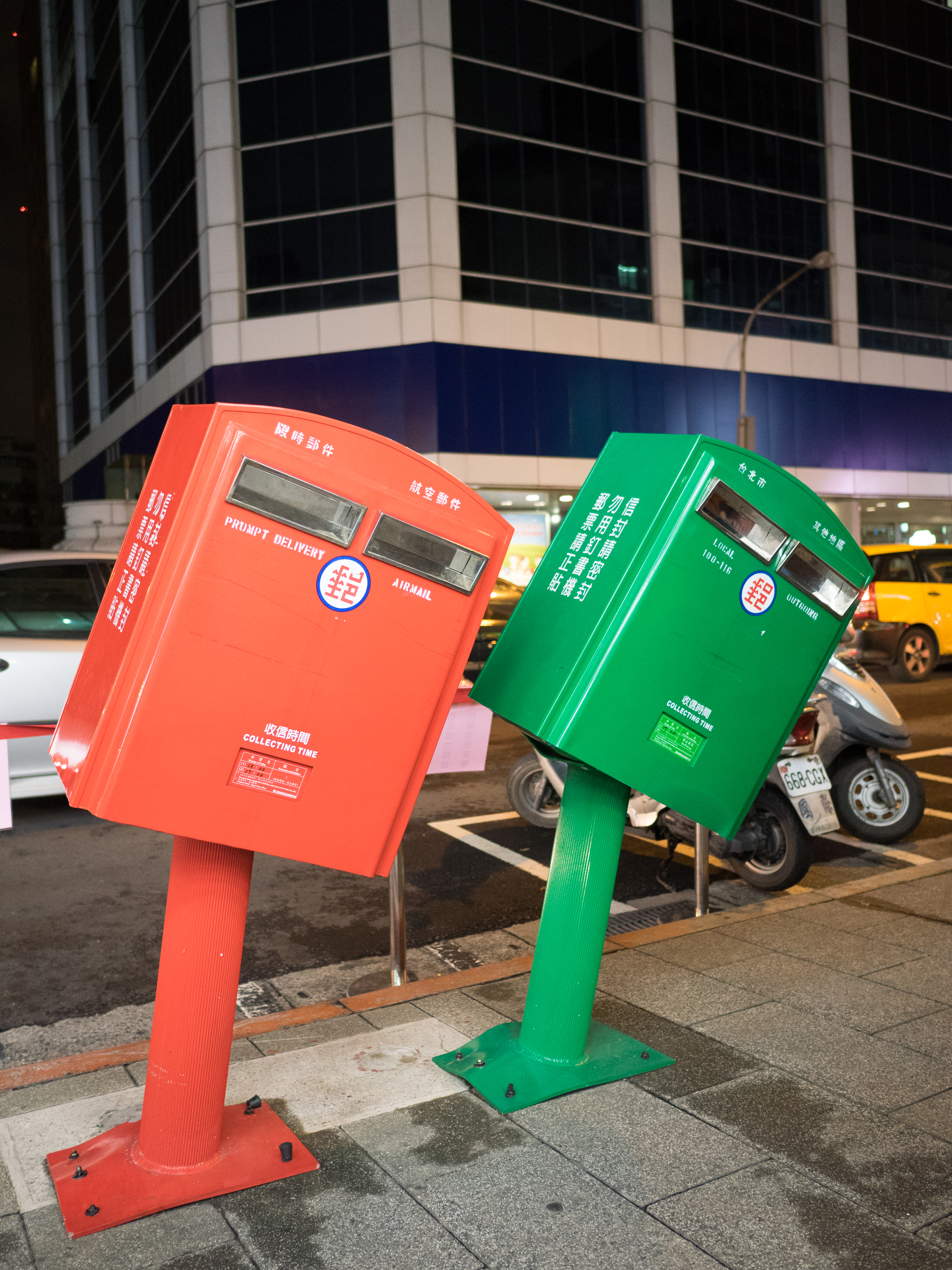
Slanted Chunghwa Post post boxes in Taipei.

At the height of the storm, 4.85 million households lost electricity. This was the largest blackout on record in Taiwan due to a typhoon, surpassing the previous record of 2.79 million after Typhoon Herb in 1996. Water supply to 429,248 homes and land line telephone service to 64,992 homes was cut during the storm. A contaminated Nanshi River suffered a drastic overflow, and soon mixed with the primary water source of the Taipei-Keelung metropolitan area. The river's turbidity reached record levels in just two hours, catching Taipei's Water Department off-guard. The excess water overwhelmed the regional purification system. As a result, the water supply to approximately 5 million households in Taipei was polluted for the next few days. Agricultural damage in Taiwan exceeded NT$3.03 billion (US$94.8 million). The banana crop suffered the greatest impact, with 5,436 hectares (13,430 acres) damaged; losses from the crop reached NT$460.15 million (US$14.3 million). Six windmills of Taipower were destroyed.

Approximately 100 people were listed as missing after contact was lost with Xiaoyi village (Siaoyi) in Wulai District of New Taipei City during the storm on August 8. Reports from firefighters dispatched to search for residents reported that homes in the area had "disappeared" following a large landslide. All residents were later accounted for on August 10.

A soldier was crushed to death while trying to clear debris on August 13.

=== China ===
Typhoon Soudelor killed 45 people in eastern China after parts of the country were hit by the heaviest rains in a century. Total economic losses were counted to be ¥24.627 billion (US$3.97 billion).

Making landfall in Fujian around 10:10 p.m. local time on August 8, the storm brought damaging winds to coastal cities in the region. The storm is regarded as the most severe to strike Fujian Province in a decade. The strongest gust was 191 km/h (119 mph) in Putian while nearby Fuzhou saw gusts up to 134 km/h (83 mph). Gusts in excess of typhoon force were almost entirely confined to Fujian. Gale-force winds extended into Jiangxi and Zhejiang. Much of East China saw torrential rains from the storm, with accumulations of at least 100 mm (3.9 in) reported in several provinces. Portions of Zhejiang Province saw 24‑hour rainfall totals with a return period of 100–120 years. Wencheng County recorded 645 mm (25.4 in) during the same span – the heaviest in 100 years. Country-wide accumulations peaked at 806 mm (31.7 in) within Wenzhou. Soudelor's merger with a cold front over Anhui and Jiangsu brought torrential rains to the region from August 9–10. The heaviest rains fell in central Jiangsu Province, peaking at 467 mm (18.4 in) along the central coastline.

=== Elsewhere ===
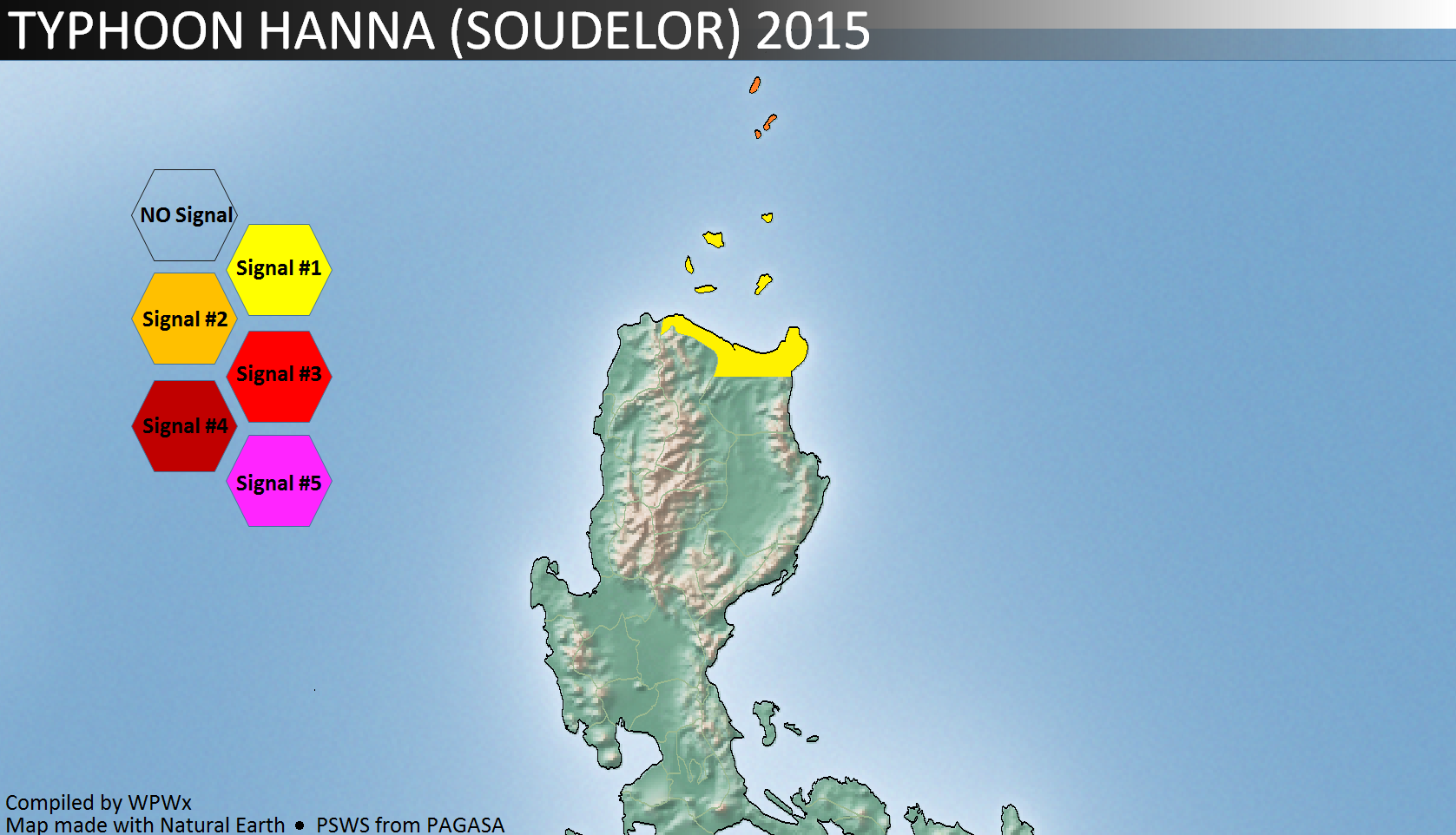
Highest Public Storm Warning Signals raised across northern Luzon in relation to Typhoon Soudelor

Typhoon Soudelor's proximity to the Philippines prompted PAGASA to issue Public Storm Warning Signal#1, the lowest on a five-tier scale, for Batanes and Cagayan provinces, including the Calayan islands, from August 6–8. Signal #2 was raised for Batanes on August 7. The storm's circulation enhanced the southwest monsoon and brought rains to Luzon and portions of the Western Visayas. Overall impacts were minor, with 58,255 people affected; 45,444 of these people sought refuge in public shelters. Agricultural damage in Batanes were at ₱363,000 (US$7,900).

Hong Kong experienced its hottest day on August 8, since records began, as a result of air descending on the outer fringe of Soudelor. The Hong Kong Observatory observed a temperature of 36.3 °C (97.3 °F), breaking the previous record of 36.1 °C (97.0 °F) set in 1900 and 1990. Air pollution was also severe on August 7 and 8 across the entire territory, with readings on Tap Mun reaching level 10.

The typhoon's remnants brought locally heavy rain to parts of South Korea on August 11, with accumulations reaching 25 to 60 mm (0.98 to 2.4 in).

== Retirement ==
Due to the widespread destruction and deaths caused by the storm in the Northern Mariana Islands, Taiwan and China, the name Soudelor was officially retired at the Fourth Joint Session of the ESCAP/WMO Typhoon Committee and WMO/ESCAP Panel on Tropical Cyclones during 2016. In February 2017, they chose the name Saudel to replace Soudelor.

== See also ==
- Weather of 2015
- Tropical cyclones in 2015
- Typhoon Omar (1992)
- Typhoon Winnie (1997)
- Typhoon Haitang (2005)
- Typhoon Morakot (2009)
- Typhoon Soulik (2013)
- Typhoon Dujuan (2015)
- Typhoon Nepartak (2016)
- Typhoon Nesat (2017)
- Typhoon Koinu (2023)
- Typhoon Gaemi (2024)
- Typhoon Bavi (2026)
