= List of storms named Gorio =

The name Gorio has been used for seven tropical cyclones in the Philippine Area of Responsibility in the West Pacific Ocean:

- Tropical Storm Trami (2001) (T0105, 07W, Gorio) – affected Taiwan.
- Typhoon Matsa (2005) (T0509, 09W, Gorio) – struck Ryukyu Islands and China.
- Tropical Storm Soudelor (2009) (T0905, 05W, Gorio) – struck southern China
- Severe Tropical Storm Rumbia (2013) (T1306, 06W, Gorio) – struck the Philippines, China, Hong Kong, and Macau.
- Typhoon Nesat (2017) (T1709, 11W, Gorio) – struck Taiwan and East China.
- Severe Tropical Storm Mirinae (2021) (T2110, 14W, Gorio) – formed east of Taiwan, and passed just south of Japan.
- Typhoon Podul (2025) (T2511, 16W, Gorio) – struck Taiwan and China

| Preceded by Fabian | Philippine typhoon names Gorio | Succeeded by Huaning |
