= Matsa =

Matsa may refer to:

- Matzah
- Typhoon Matsa
