= Typhoon Soulik (2013) =

Pacific typhoon in 2013

Typhoon Soulik (Huaning)
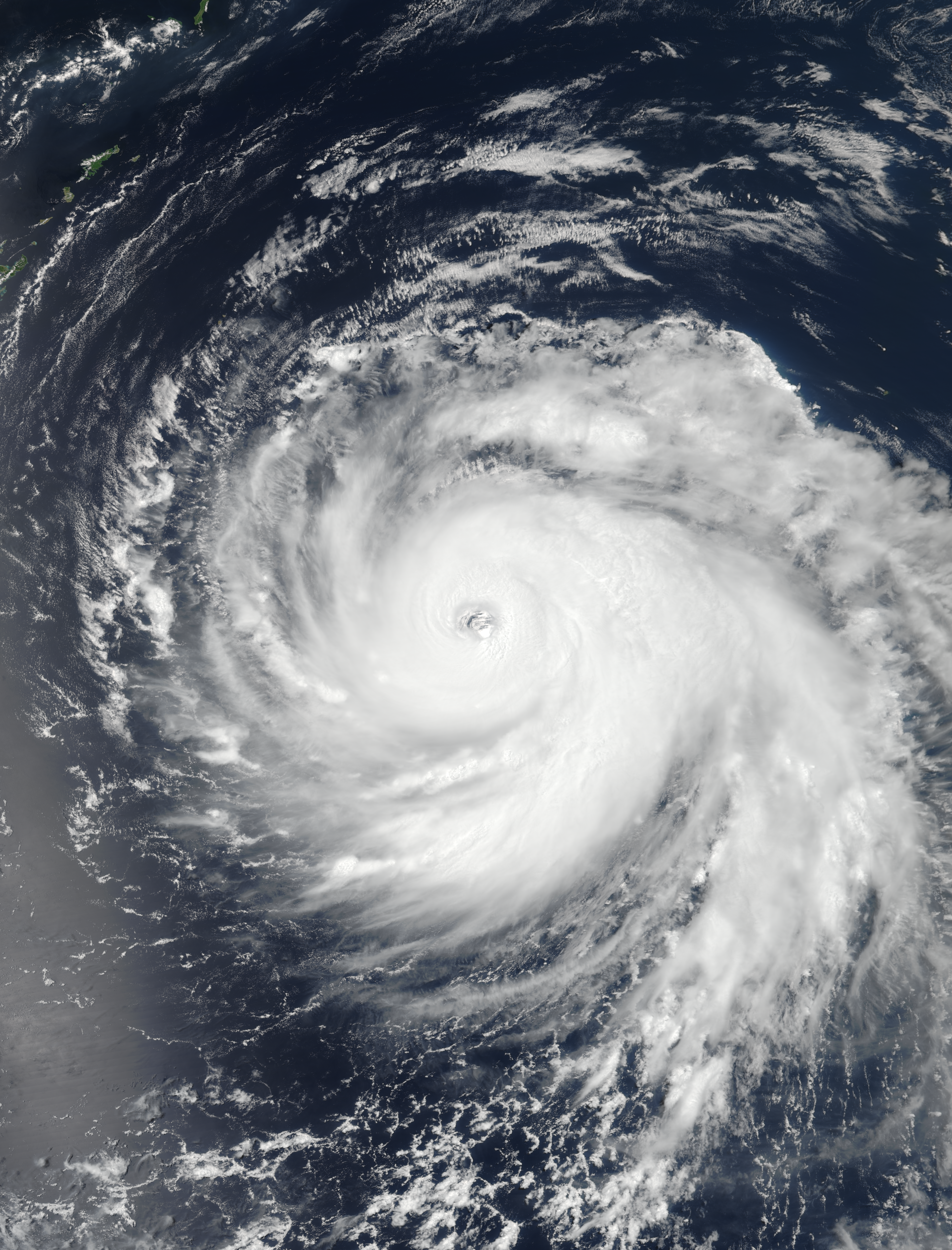
- Soulik at peak intensity on July 10

Meteorological history
- Formed: July 7, 2013
- Dissipated: July 14, 2013

Very strong typhoon
- 10-minute sustained (JMA)
- Highest winds: 185 km/h (115 mph)
- Lowest pressure: 925 hPa (mbar); 27.32 inHg

Category 4-equivalent typhoon
- 1-minute sustained (SSHWS/JTWC)
- Highest winds: 230 km/h (145 mph)
- Lowest pressure: 929 hPa (mbar); 27.43 inHg

Overall effects
- Fatalities: 15
- Damage: $600 million (2013 USD)
- Areas affected: Yaeyama Islands, Batanes, Taiwan, Fujian, Zhejiang, Jiangxi, Guangdong
- IBTrACS
- Part of the 2013 Pacific typhoon season

Typhoon Soulik, (Note: The name Soulik (Pohnpeian: Soulik, [sʲoulik]) was contributed by the Federated States of Micronesia and refers to a traditional title of Pohnpeian chiefs in Pohnpeian.) known in the Philippines as Typhoon Huaning, was a powerful tropical cyclone that caused widespread damage in Taiwan and East China in mid-July 2013. It is the seventh named storm and the first typhoon of the 2013 Pacific typhoon season. The storm originated from an upper-level cold-core low well to the northeast of Guam on July 6. Gaining tropical characteristics, the system soon developed a surface low and became a tropical depression early on July 7.

Tracking generally westward, a motion it would retain for its entire existence, the depression underwent a period of rapid intensification starting on July 8 that culminated in Soulik attaining its peak strength early on July 10. At that time, the system had sustained winds estimated at 185 km/h (115 mph) and barometric pressure of 925 mbar (hPa; 27.32 inHg). Thereafter, an eyewall replacement cycle and cooler waters weakened the system. Though it passed over the warm waters of the Kuroshio Current the following day, dry air soon impinged upon the typhoon. Soulik later made landfall late on July 12 in northern Taiwan before degrading to a tropical storm. Briefly emerging over the Taiwan Strait, the storm moved onshore for a second time in Fujian on July 13. The system was last noted as a tropical depression early on July 14.

Striking Taiwan as a strong typhoon, Soulik brought gusts up to 220 km/h (140 mph) and torrential rains. Numerous trees and power lines fell, leaving roughly 800,000 without electricity. Severe flooding prompted thousands to evacuate as well. Four people lost their lives on the island while 123 more were injured. In East China, more than 162 million people were affected by the storm. Heavy rains and typhoon-force winds caused extensive damage and killed 11 people.

== Meteorological history ==
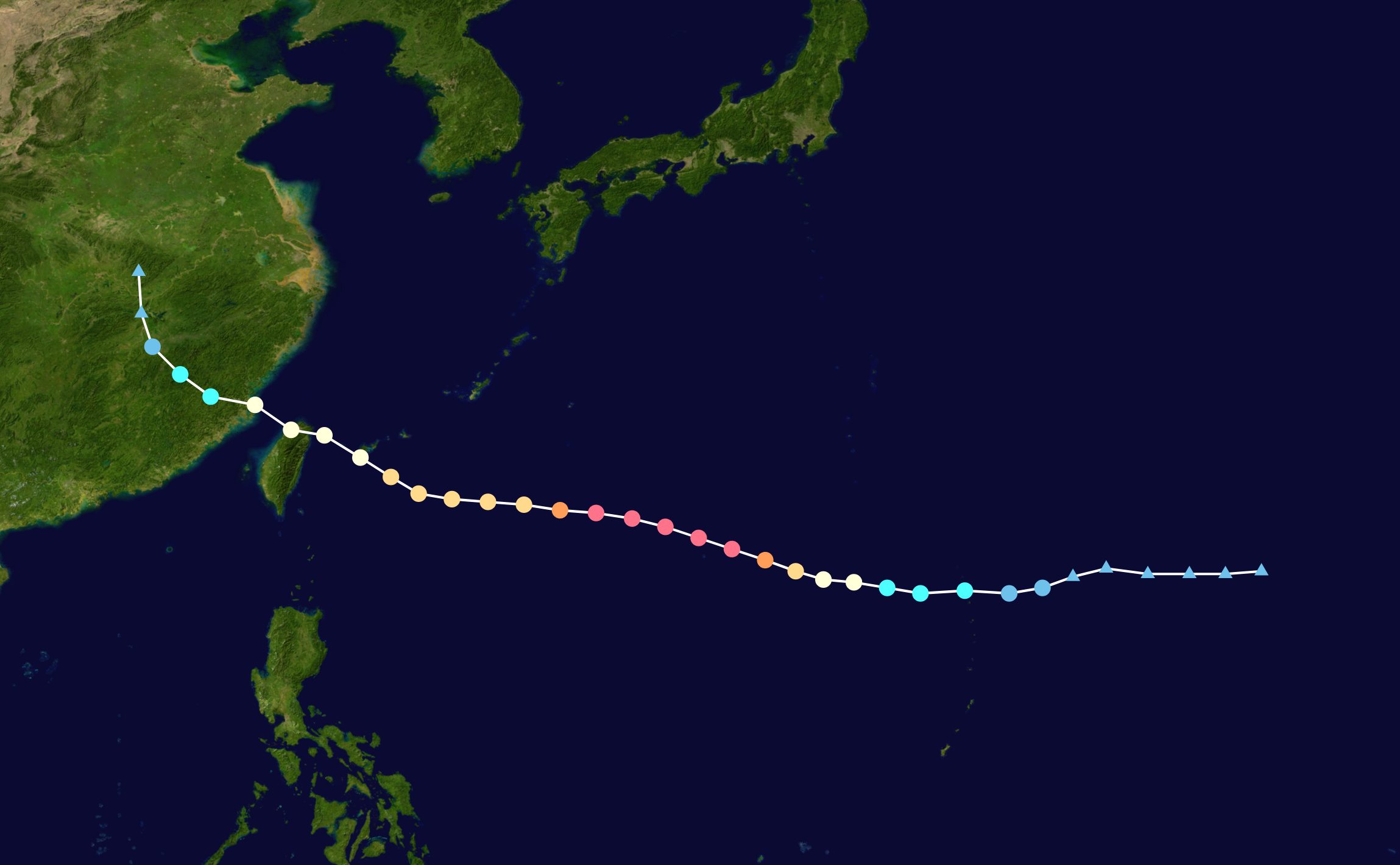
Map plotting the storm's track and intensity, according to the Saffir–Simpson scale Map key Saffir–Simpson scale Tropical depression (≤38 mph, ≤62 km/h) Tropical storm (39–73 mph, 63–118 km/h) Category 1 (74–95 mph, 119–153 km/h) Category 2 (96–110 mph, 154–177 km/h) Category 3 (111–129 mph, 178–208 km/h) Category 4 (130–156 mph, 209–251 km/h) Category 5 (≥157 mph, ≥252 km/h) Unknown Storm type Tropical cyclone Subtropical cyclone Extratropical cyclone, remnant low, tropical disturbance, or monsoon depression

On July 6, the Joint Typhoon Warning Center (JTWC) began monitoring a mid- to upper-level low associated with an easterly wave roughly 1,390 km (860 mi) northeast of Guam. (Note: The Joint Typhoon Warning Center is a joint United States Navy – United States Air Force task force that issues tropical cyclone warnings for the western Pacific Ocean and other regions.) Though satellite analysis indicated no low-level circulation, atmospheric conditions favoured development over the following days. Early the next day, a broad surface low developed and scatterometer passes revealed strong easterly winds to the northeast of the center, which were expected to wrap into the system as it intensified. Despite still being a mostly cold-core system and considered subtropical by the JTWC, the Japan Meteorological Agency (JMA) classified the system as a tropical depression. (Note: The Japan Meteorological Agency is the official Regional Specialized Meteorological Center for the western Pacific Ocean.) Over the following hours, rapid consolidation of the low took place with deep convective banding features wrapping around the low and a distinct transition into a tropical cyclone. In light of this, the JTWC commenced advisories on Tropical Depression 07W. Situated to the south of a subtropical ridge, the depression tracked steadily west to west-northwest over a region of high sea surface temperatures and low wind shear.

Rapid deepening began on July 8 with an eye-like feature developing over the center. Additionally, the storm's westerly motion mitigated the negative effects of wind shear and its upper-level outflow greatly improved. The rate of strengthening surpassed constraints implemented within the Dvorak Technique, a tool used by meteorologists to estimate a cyclone's intensity based on satellite appearance. Both the JTWC and JMA estimated the system to have attained tropical storm status that morning, with the latter assigning it the name Soulik. Throughout the day, the storm's eye became increasingly defined on SSMIS satellite images and the system attained typhoon status within 24 hours of being named. Three tropical upper tropospheric troughs, two located to the northwest and one to the east of Soulik, greatly enhanced the typhoon's outflow and allowed for the development of a clear, 85 km (53 mi) wide eye which soon contracted to 40 km (25 mi) in diameter. Due to the cyclone's proximity to the Philippines, the Philippine Atmospheric, Geophysical and Astronomical Services Administration also monitored the storm and assigned it the local name Huaning. Soulik ultimately attained its peak intensity early on July 10 with winds of 185 km/h (115 mph) and a barometric pressure of 925 mbar (hPa; 27.32 inHg). At this time, the JTWC estimated the storm to have been a Category 4-equivalent on the Saffir–Simpson hurricane scale with one-minute sustained winds of 230 km/h (145 mph).

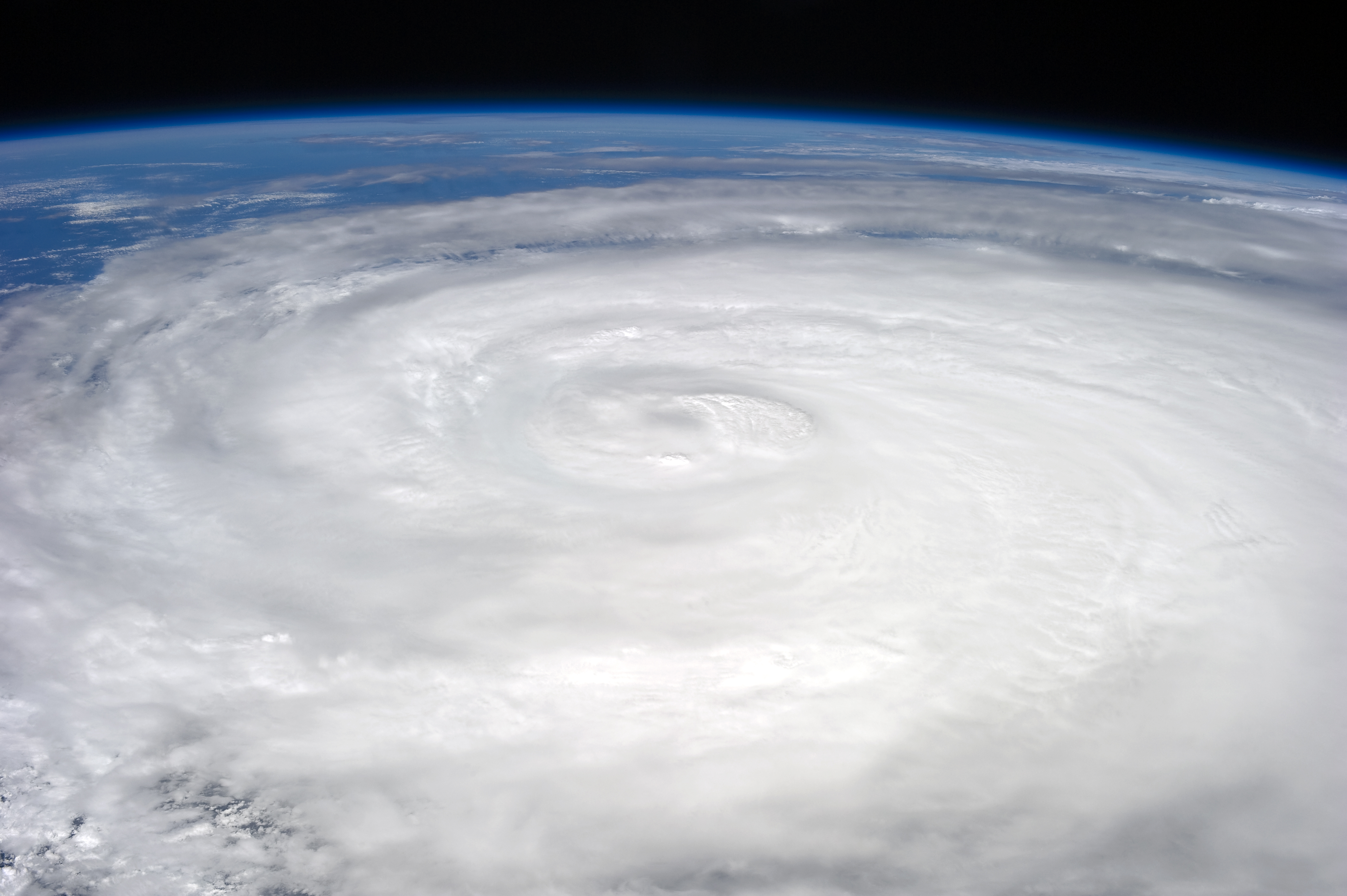
Typhoon Soulik seen from the International Space Station on July 11

A substantially larger secondary eye, estimated to be 315 km (196 mi) wide, began forming shortly after Soulik attained its peak on July 10. By this time, the deep convection was no longer symmetrical around the storm and was mostly located over the southern and eastern areas of the circulation. This formation of a secondary eye indicated an eyewall replacement cycle was in progress; however, it coincided with the typhoon passing over a small area of very low oceanic heat content and prompted a weakening trend. Convection around Soulik's core gradually weakened, though it retained a well-defined inner eye. The simultaneous occurrence of these two factors greatly hindered reorganization of the system and the weakening trend continued as the typhoon tracked west-northwest toward Taiwan. On July 11, this trend temporarily abated as Soulik moved over the warm waters of the Kuroshio Current, allowing for structural improvement. Early on July 12, dry air began to entrain into the northwestern portion of the circulation, suppressing thunderstorm development. Along the southeastern side of the storm, a large band of convection maintained itself and wrapped around a poorly defined eye.

Throughout July 12, dry air compromised the structure of Soulik as it worked into the system's center between bands of convection. Despite this, the storm's eye cleared somewhat, though remained ragged. Later that day, the typhoon accelerated on its approach to Taiwan. Interaction with the mountainous terrain of the island soon had adverse effects on the storm and caused its eye to fill. Soulik made landfall near Yilan City northern Taiwan, with estimated winds of 150 km/h (95 mph) between 1800 and 2100 UTC. Once onshore, the system quickly weakened below typhoon intensity; however, the JTWC estimated that it retained typhoon strength during its crossing of the island. A phenomenon known as a lee side jump caused the circulation center to move abruptly west and Soulik emerged over the Taiwan Strait within six hours of landfall. Once back over water, the storm failed to reorganize and its center became devoid of convection. Remaining over water for less than 12 hours, Soulik made its final landfall near Fuzhou, Fujian with winds of 95 km/h (60 mph). Once onshore, the storm quickly weakened to a tropical depression before it was last noted by the JMA later that day as it dissipated over land.

== Preparations ==
=== Philippines ===
Though the storm was forecast to remain away from the Philippines, it was expected to enhance the southwest monsoon over western areas of the country starting July 10. Later that day, PAGASA issued Public Storm Warning Signal (PSWS) #1 for the Batanes in northern Luzon, indicating expected winds of 45 to 60 km/h (28 to 37 mph). Fishermen along the northern and eastern seaboards of the region were advised to avoid sailing due to rough seas. On July 12, the PSWS for the Batanes was raised to #2 as winds were expected to reach 61 to 100 km/h (38 to 62 mph) as the storm brushed the area. Additionally, the Calayan and Babuyan Islands were placed under PSWS #1. Following the typhoon's landfall in Taiwan, the signal were discontinued for all areas during the morning of July 13.

=== Japan ===
Hours after the JMA declared Soulik a tropical storm, the agency noted that the Ryukyu Islands were in the path of the storm. By July 10, the Daitō Islands were expected to experience winds of 55 km/h (35 mph) as the storm passed to the south. Due to the storm's large size, areas as far north as the Amami Islands were expected to see effects from the typhoon. Starting during the evening of July 10 and continuing through July 12, ferry service in across the southern islands was suspended and cargo vessels were advised to take alternate courses. Farmers on Miyako-jima were advised to harvest their mango crop, which was nearing peak time for harvest, before the typhoon struck. As the storm moved closer to the Daitō Islands, the JMA urged residents to be aware of coastal conditions and potential storm surges. On July 12, all flights to and from Ishigaki Airport and Miyako Airport were canceled.

=== Taiwan ===
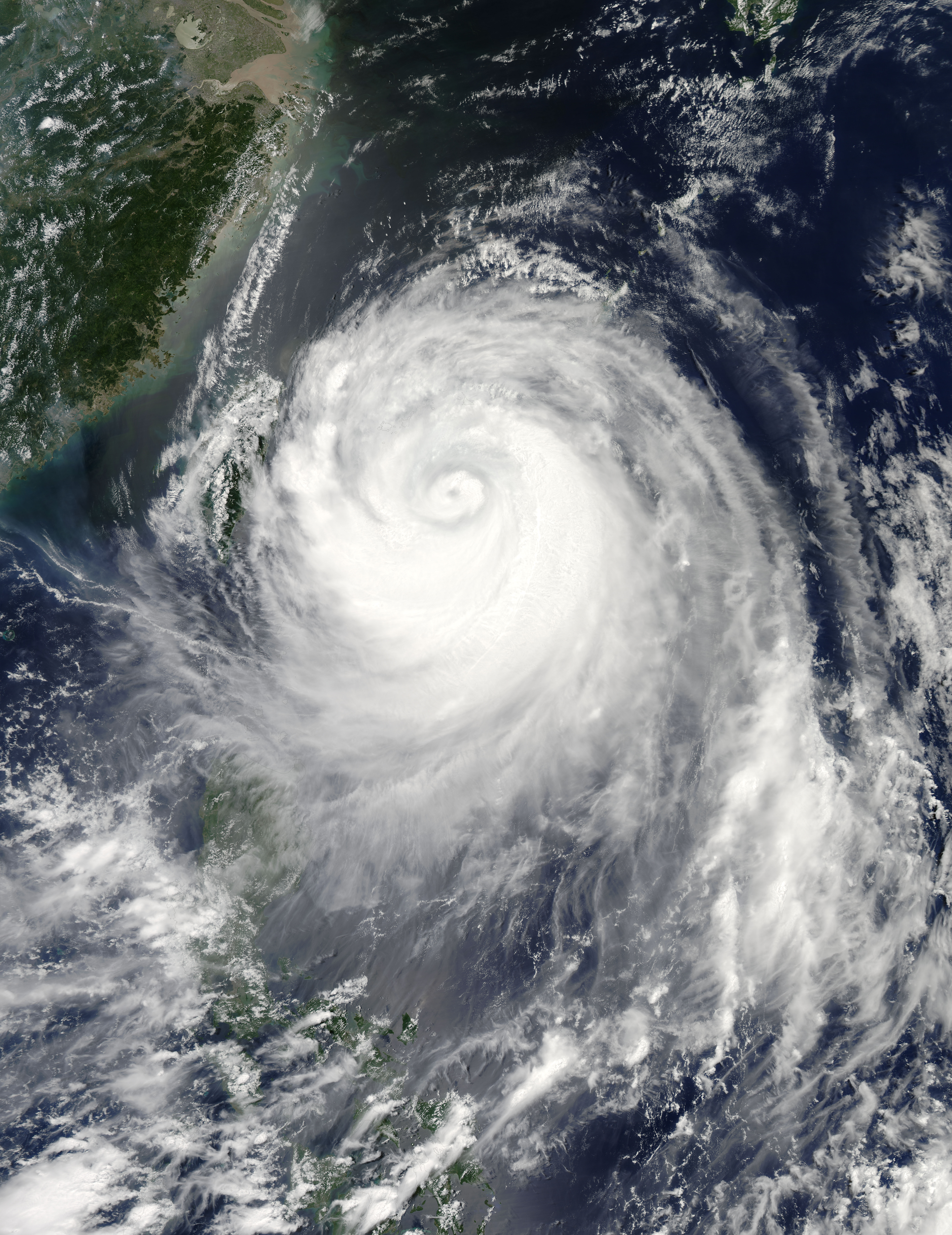
Typhoon Soulik approaching Taiwan on July 12

In Taiwan, over 8,000 people were evacuated from mountainous areas because of the threat of landslides from torrential rain. In Taiwan's cities, Kaohsiung had 3,000 residents evacuated while 2,000 were evacuated from Pingtung county. The Taiwan Central Weather Bureau has put "Typhoon News and Typhoon Warning" into effect.

=== Mainland China ===
On July 11, the China Meteorological Administration (CMA) placed much of East China under a yellow alert, the second level of a four-tier warning system. Additionally, Fujian was placed under an orange alert, the second-highest level of warning. A national early disaster warning was also put in place that day, with local authorities across the country asked to be on duty around-the-clock. Residents in Fujian, Jiangxi, and Zhejiang were advised to prepare for heavy rains capable of producing floods and landslides. In Fujian, more than 304,000 people were evacuated prior to Soulik's arrival. Public transportation was brought to a standstill in some areas and 142 flights from Fuzhou Changle International Airport were canceled. The National Marine Environmental Forecasting Center also issued a top-level maritime for areas over the southern East China Sea, with waves expected to reach 6 to 10 m (20 to 33 ft). Additionally, roughly 5,500 soldiers were dispatched to 18 counties in Fujian to assist in possible rescue efforts.

== Impact ==
=== Japan ===
Skirting the southern Ryukyu Islands, Soulik brought typhoon-force winds to several areas on July 13, with a peak gust of 217 km/h (135 mph) measured in Yonaguni, Okinawa. The winds downed numerous trees and power lines across the region and left roughly 16,100 households without electricity. Significant crop damage took place as well with losses reaching ¥573 million (US$5.77 million), mostly from damage to sugar cane. A total of 11 people were injured in various incidents, one of whom was seriously injured. Rainfall from the storm peaked at 194 mm (7.6 in) in Ishigaki.,

=== Taiwan ===
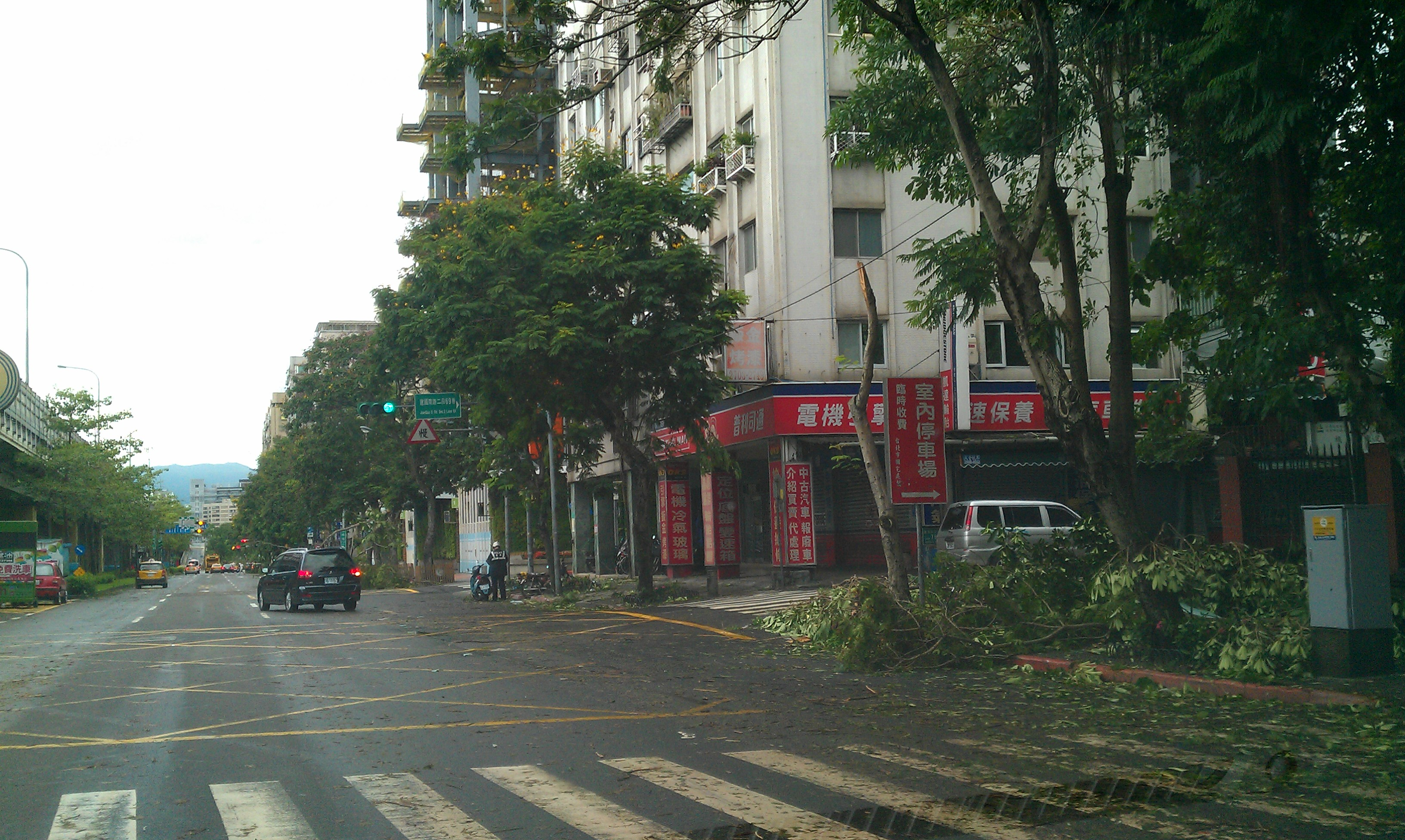
Damage caused by Soulik in Taipei

According to the Central Weather Bureau, Soulik struck Taiwan with winds of 190 km/h (120 mph) and gusts as high as 220 km/h (140 mph). Winds up to 120 km/h (75 mph) buffeted Taipei, tearing roofs off buildings, downing power lines, and snapping or uprooting 1,000 trees. At the height of the storm, roughly 800,000 residences were without power. Torrential rains, amounting to 900 mm (35 in) in Bailan, accompanied the destructive winds. Taipei 101 had its greatest sway amplitude since its completion, shifting up to 70 cm (28 in) during the storm. Flash flooding and landslides caused widespread damage and forced thousands to evacuate. In Puli, Nantou, nine people had to be rescued from their homes as floods inundated the area. An official in the town stated that the typhoon was "more serious than we predicted." In the coastal city of Keelung, streets were covered in up to 30 cm (0.98 ft) of sea water. Low-lying areas along the Hsintien River in greater Taipei were also flooded and one aboriginal town was forced to evacuate. Across the island, four people were killed by the storm: one from head trauma, another from falling off a roof, one from drowning, and a fourth from unknown causes. Additionally, 123 people were injured in various incidents. Substantial damage took place within the agricultural sector, with losses estimated in excess of NT$1.27 billion (US$42.5 million). Crop losses accounted for NT$1.12 billion (US$37.5 million) of this. Rice, banana, pear, guava, and bamboo crops were the hardest hit across the island. A total of 457 schools were damaged, with losses totaling to NT$46.3 million (US$1.5 million).

Immediately following the typhoon, power companies deployed approximately 1,600 personnel to restore downed or interrupted transmission lines. Electricity was fully restored to the island by July 15. Four days after the storm, a dog and four puppies that went missing in Miaoli County after a flash flood and landslide were found on a cliff side and rescued.

=== Mainland China ===
Coastal Fujian was battered by typhoon-force winds and waves up to 10 m (33 ft) high. In Ningde, strong winds destroyed billboards and uprooted trees. Preliminary estimates in the province indicated that 72 million people were affected by the storm, more than half of whom were temporarily displaced. At least 990 homes collapsed and direct economic losses reached ¥1.744 billion (US$284 million). Additionally, no casualties took place in the province, with media outlets remarking the storm as the "first won battle." In Wenzhou, Zhejiang alone, 410,000 people were affected and economic losses amounted to ¥212 million (US$34.58 million). Heavy rains from the storm extended into Guangdong where many areas recorded 100 to 250 mm (3.9 to 9.8 in) of rain; accumulations peaked at 292.5 mm (11.52 in) in Minamifuku. These rains triggered flooding in many areas of the province and affected 38.2 million people. Approximately 2 million were forced to evacuate their homes. The Hanjiang River crested at 43.68 m (143.3 ft), 1.68 m (5.5 ft) above flood stage, with a flow rate of 5,230 m^{3} (185,000 ft^{3}) per second. At least three people were killed in the province and 1,076 homes were destroyed with losses amounting to ¥350 million (US$57 million). In Jiangxi, heavy rains from the storm peaked at 354.3 mm (13.95 in) with a province-wide average of 26.8 mm (1.06 in). Two people were killed while another was listed as missing in the province. Approximately 35.84 million people were directly affected in Jiangxi, of whom 6,159 were displaced, and losses amounted to ¥353 million (US$57.5 million).

Further north in Qingdao, Shandong, large quantities of sea lettuce washed ashore under the typhoon's influence. The city dispatched crews with heavy machinery in order to clear beaches of the lettuce. 11 people were killed, and total damages from the storm were amounted to be ¥3.39 billion (US$552 million).

== See also ==
- Typhoon Longwang
- Typhoon Haitang (2005)
- Typhoon Sinlaku (2002)
- Typhoon Soudelor (2015)
- Typhoon Nepartak (2016)
- Typhoon Maria (2018)
- Typhoon Haikui (2023)
- Typhoon Podul (2025)
