= Typhoon Nesat (2017) =

Pacific typhoon in 2017

Typhoon Nesat (Gorio)
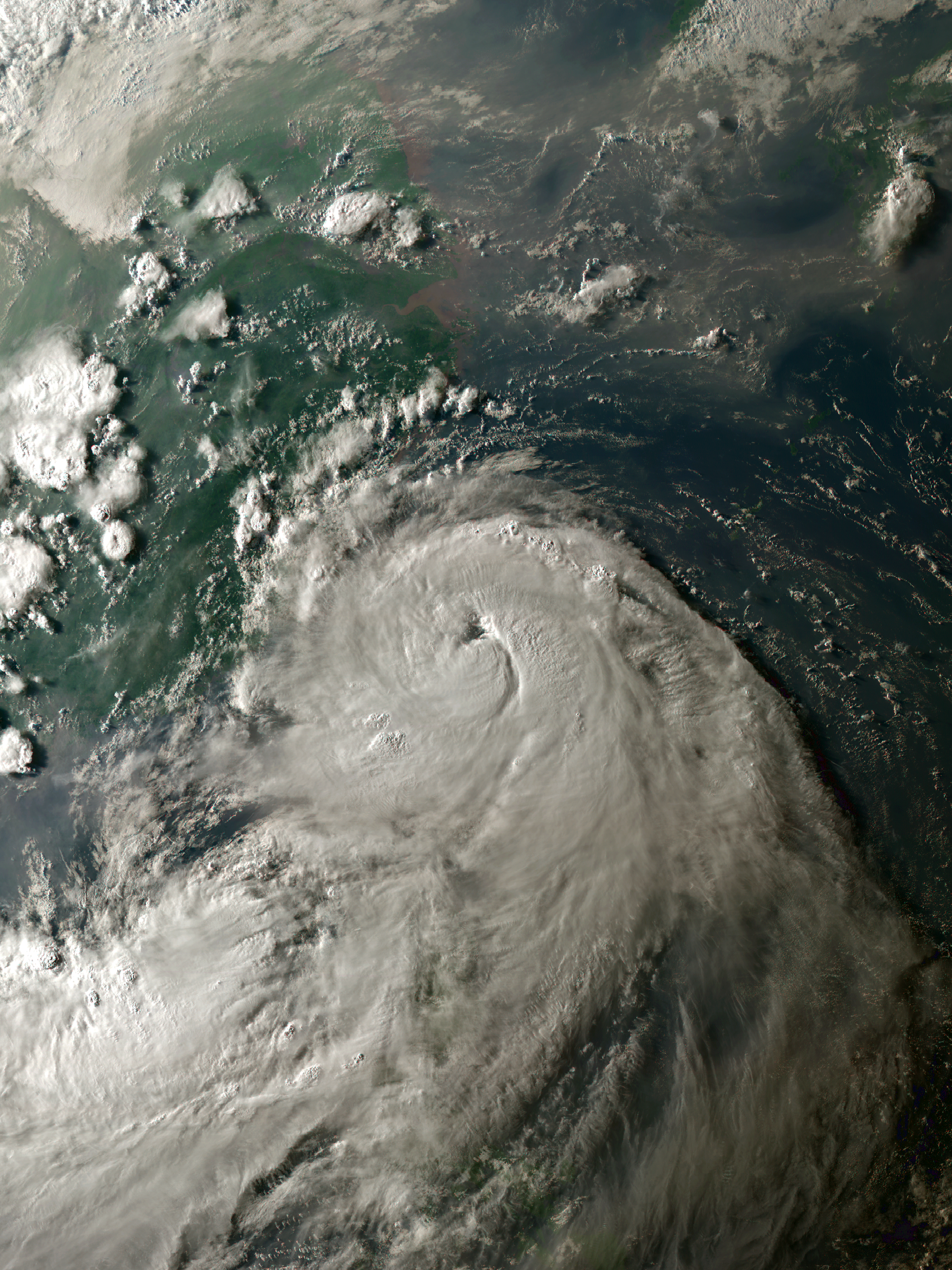
- Typhoon Nesat approaching Taiwan at peak intensity on July 29, with Tropical Storm Haitang to its southwest

Meteorological history
- Formed: July 25, 2017
- Dissipated: July 30, 2017

Typhoon
- 10-minute sustained (JMA)
- Highest winds: 150 km/h (90 mph)
- Lowest pressure: 960 hPa (mbar); 28.35 inHg

Category 2-equivalent typhoon
- 1-minute sustained (SSHWS/JTWC)
- Highest winds: 155 km/h (100 mph)
- Lowest pressure: 959 hPa (mbar); 28.32 inHg

Overall effects
- Fatalities: 3 total
- Damage: $282 million (2017 USD)
- Areas affected: Philippines, Ryukyu Islands, Taiwan, East China, Thailand
- IBTrACS
- Part of the 2017 Pacific typhoon season

Typhoon Nesat, known in the Philippines as Typhoon Gorio, was a strong tropical cyclone that impacted Taiwan and Fujian, China in late July 2017. It was the ninth named storm and the second typhoon of the annual typhoon season. After consolidating slowly for several days, Tropical Storm Nesat developed east of the Philippines on July 25. While experiencing favorable environmental conditions such as very warm sea surface temperatures and low wind shear, Nesat strengthened into a typhoon and reached its peak intensity on July 28. On July 29, the typhoon made landfall near the Taiwanese city of Yilan, before weakening to a severe tropical storm and making landfall again near Fuqing on China's east coast late the same day. Moving into July 30, Nesat continued to weaken under the effects of land interaction.

== Meteorological history ==
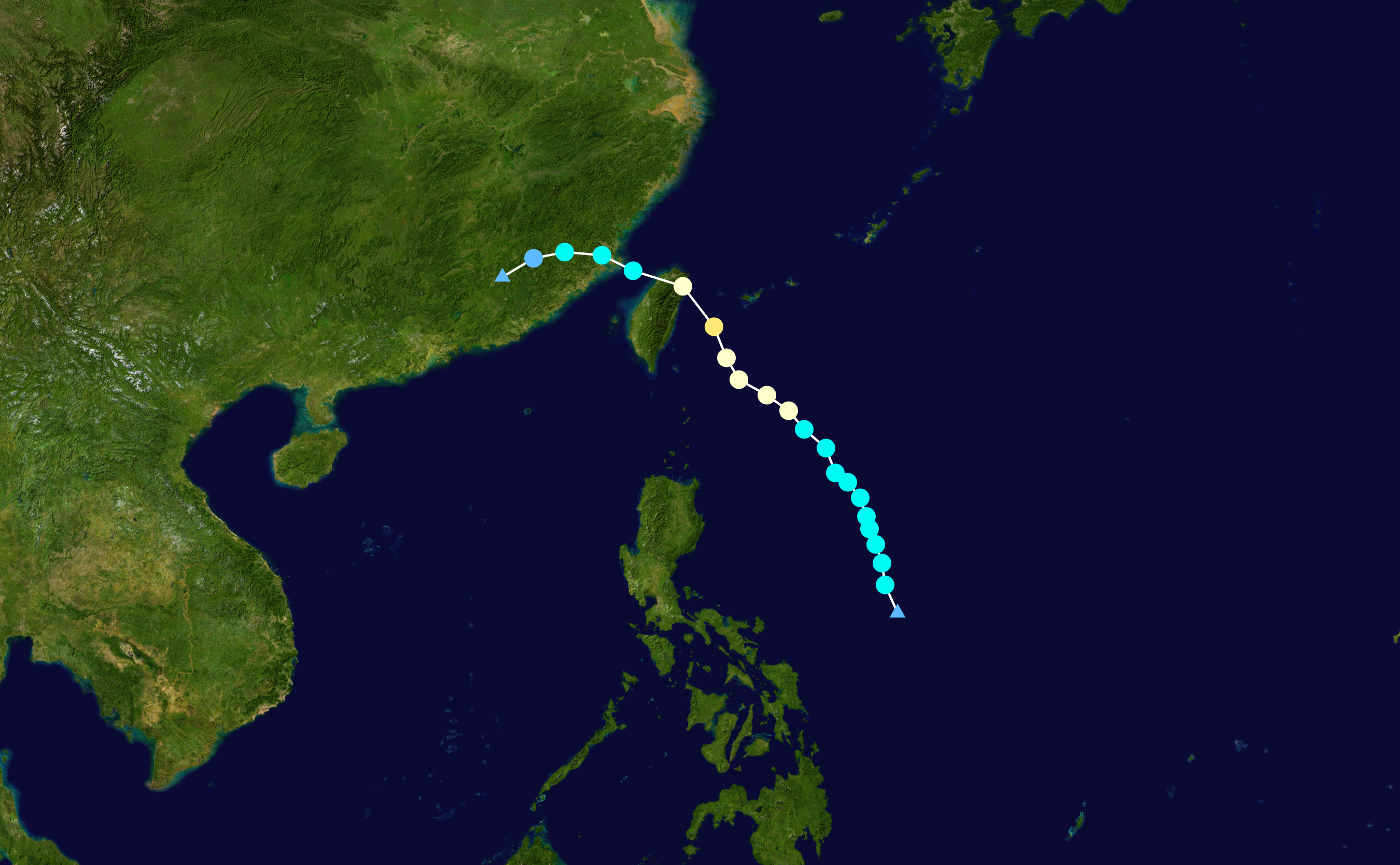
Map plotting the storm's track and intensity, according to the Saffir–Simpson scale Map key Saffir–Simpson scale Tropical depression (≤38 mph, ≤62 km/h) Tropical storm (39–73 mph, 63–118 km/h) Category 1 (74–95 mph, 119–153 km/h) Category 2 (96–110 mph, 154–177 km/h) Category 3 (111–129 mph, 178–208 km/h) Category 4 (130–156 mph, 209–251 km/h) Category 5 (≥157 mph, ≥252 km/h) Unknown Storm type Tropical cyclone Subtropical cyclone Extratropical cyclone, remnant low, tropical disturbance, or monsoon depression

A tropical disturbance accompanied by a broad low-pressure area formed near Palau on July 21; its circulation and associated convection remained elongated and disorganized for the next few days. However, on July 25, the system began to consolidate, with formative convective banding wrapping into its low-level circulation center. As such, the Japan Meteorological Agency (JMA) upgraded it to a tropical depression, and the Joint Typhoon Warning Center (JTWC) issued a Tropical Cyclone Formation Alert shortly after. Meanwhile, PAGASA also stated that the system had intensified into Tropical Depression Gorio. Despite having a partially exposed LLCC, the JTWC also upgraded the system to a tropical depression early on July 26, after scatterometer data and the Dvorak technique revealed sufficient organization. Soon after that, the JMA upgraded the system to a tropical storm and assigned it the international name Nesat while it was located about 600 km (375 mi) east-northeast to Naga, Philippines. (Note: The name Nesat (Khmer: នេសាទ, [neː.ˈsaːt]) was contributed by Cambodia and means fishing in Khmer.) Later on July 26, JTWC followed suit and upgraded it to a tropical storm.

Tropical Storm Nesat began to intensify slowly as it tracked generally northwestward along the western edge of an extension of the subtropical ridge centered to the east, aided by a weak anticyclone over the system and a vigorous equatorward outflow channel. By the morning on July 27, the JMA upgraded Nesat to a severe tropical storm. Amid favorable conditions with weakening vertical wind shear and sea surface temperatures of over 31 °C (88 °F) in the area southeast of Taiwan, Nesat intensified into a typhoon at around 06:00 UTC on July 28. Despite a new tropical depression to the west of the typhoon restricting outflow to the west, Nesat strengthened further to reach its peak intensity at around 18:00 UTC, with the central pressure at 960 hPa (28.35 inHg) and ten-minute maximum sustained winds at 150 km/h (90 mph). As Nesat continued to approach Taiwan, animated radar imageries from the Central Weather Bureau (CWB) of Taiwan and microwave imagery depicted a developing eye with strong spiral banding.

Maintaining its peak intensity, Typhoon Nesat made its first landfall over Su'ao, Yilan County in Taiwan at 11:10 UTC and re-emerged over the Taiwan Strait from Zhunan, Miaoli County at 14:30 UTC. The mountainous terrain of Taiwan caused Nesat's convective structure to rapidly decay while cloud tops quickly warmed. At around 21:00 UTC, the JMA downgraded it to a severe tropical storm, and the JTWC downgraded it to a tropical storm. At around 22:00 UTC on July 29, Nesat made its second landfall over Fuqing, Fujian, China. About five hours later, the JTWC issued their final warning on Nesat.

== Preparations and impact ==
=== Philippines ===
Even though Nesat remained well away from the country, the system enhanced the southwest monsoon which resulted in torrential rains and severe flooding, particularly in western Luzon. Damages reportedly reached ₱247.58 million (US$4.9 million). On July 27, Executive Secretary Salvador Medialdea announces the suspension of work in all government offices and classes in public school at all levels in Metro Manila due to inclement weather.

=== Taiwan ===
Before Nesat made landfall, more than 10,000 people, largely from the southern parts of Taiwan, were evacuated and 1,612 were moved into shelters. A total of 145 international flights were cancelled. As Nesat moved inland, it produced strong winds that downed power lines, leaving nearly half a million households without electricity. A total of 111 people were injured when the typhoon hit. Agricultural losses across the country were estimated at NT$176 million (US$5.83 million). Nearly 200 schools across Taiwan were damaged, accounting for about NT$17.8 million (US$588,000) of losses. Together with Tropical Storm Haitang a few days later, a total of NT$280.5 million (US$9.26 million) worth of damage was inflicted on the country.

=== China ===
Some 70,000 people have been evacuated and dozens of trains and flights suspended in Fuzhou, according to Fujian's water resources department.

== See also ==
- Other typhoons named Nesat
- Other typhoons named Gorio
- Weather of 2017
- Tropical cyclones in 2017
- Tropical Storm Morakot (2003)
- Typhoon Saola (2012)
- Typhoon Matmo (2014)
- Typhoon Gaemi (2024)
- Typhoon Podul (2025) - a strong typhoon that struck Taiwan at a similar intensity and also had the same Philippine name.
