= List of storms named Fabian =

The name Fabian has been used for four tropical cyclones in the Atlantic Ocean and seven in the West Pacific Ocean, including four in the Philippine Area of Responsibility (PAR).

In the Atlantic, where Fabian replaced Frederic:

- Tropical Storm Fabian (1985) – threatened no land
- Tropical Storm Fabian (1991) – struck the Isle of Youth and mainland Cuba
- Tropical Storm Fabian (1997) – remained over the open ocean
- Hurricane Fabian (2003) – Category 4 hurricane; caused $300 million damage and four deaths after passing directly over Bermuda

Fabian was retired after the 2003 season and replaced with Fred.

In the West Pacific:

- Tropical Storm Fabian (1981) (T8123, 23W, Unsing) – struck Cam Ranh Bay, Vietnam
- Tropical Storm Fabian (1985) (T8501, 02W, Atring) – passed near the Yap Main Islands
- Tropical Storm Fabian (1988) (T8815, 12W) – did not impact land

In the PAR, Fabian replaced Feria on the naming lists.

- Tropical Storm Bebinca (2013) (T1305, 05W, Fabian) – brought minor damage in China and Vietnam
- Tropical Storm Roke (2017) (T1707, 10W, Fabian) – struck Hong Kong and Shenzhen
- Typhoon In-fa (2021; T2106, 09W, Fabian) – made landfalls in the Putuo District of Zhoushan and Pinghu, China
- Tropical Depression Fabian (2025) – brought minimal damages in the Philippines

== See also ==
- Cyclone Fabien (2023) – a South-West Indian Ocean tropical cyclone with a similar name

Preceded by Elias	Pacific typhoon season names Fabian	Succeeded by Gorio
