= List of storms named Feria =

The name Feria has been used for three tropical cyclones in the Philippine Area of Responsibility by PAGASA in the Western Pacific Ocean.

- Tropical Storm Utor (2001) (T0104, 06W, Feria) – a large and deadly storm that caused heavy rains and landslides in the Philippines, Taiwan, and China
- Typhoon Haitang (2005) (T0505, 05W, Feria) – struck Taiwan and China.
- Tropical Storm Nangka (2009) (T0904, 04W, Feria) – made three landfalls as it traversed the Philippines, then made a final landfall in Guangdong province in China.

The name Feria was removed following the 2009 Pacific typhoon season for unknown reasons and was replaced with Fabian.
