= Typhoon Haitang (2005) =

Pacific typhoon in 2005

Typhoon Haitang (Feria)
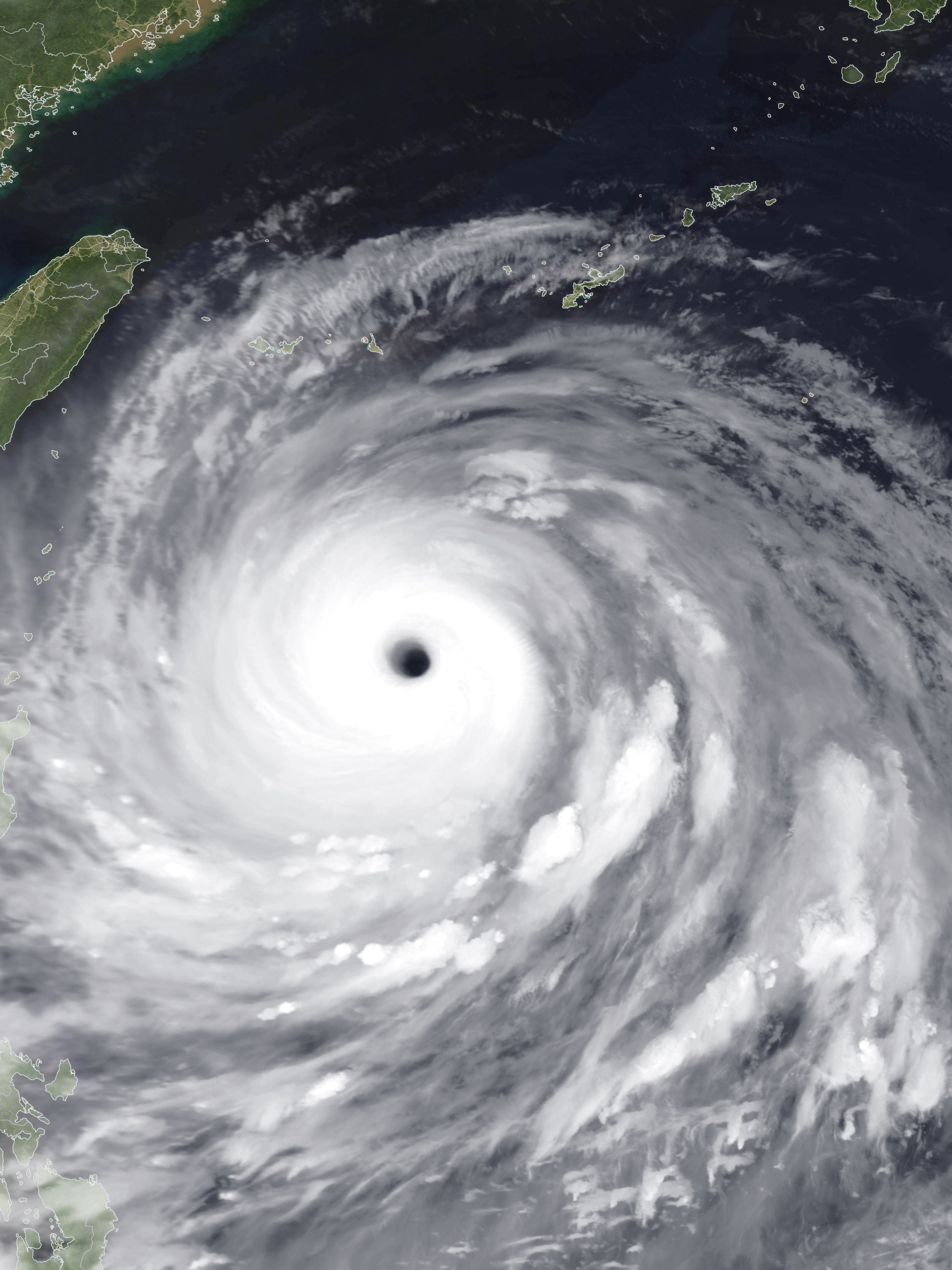
- Haitang at peak intensity on July 16

Meteorological history
- Formed: July 11, 2005
- Dissipated: July 20, 2005

Violent typhoon
- 10-minute sustained (JMA)
- Highest winds: 195 km/h (120 mph)
- Lowest pressure: 920 hPa (mbar); 27.17 inHg

Category 5-equivalent super typhoon
- 1-minute sustained (SSHWS/JTWC)
- Highest winds: 260 km/h (160 mph)
- Lowest pressure: 898 hPa (mbar); 26.52 inHg

Overall effects
- Fatalities: 20 total
- Damage: $1.17 billion (2005 USD)
- Areas affected: Ryūkyū Islands, Taiwan, China
- IBTrACS
- Part of the 2005 Pacific typhoon season

Typhoon Haitang, known in the Philippines as Super Typhoon Feria, was the first super typhoon of the 2005 season in the northwestern Pacific. It had winds up to 260 km/h (160 mph) at peak intensity, and caused over 18 serious injuries and 15 confirmed deaths in Taiwan and the People's Republic of China. Damage totaled about $1.17 billion (2005 USD), most of which occurred in mainland China.

== Meteorological history ==
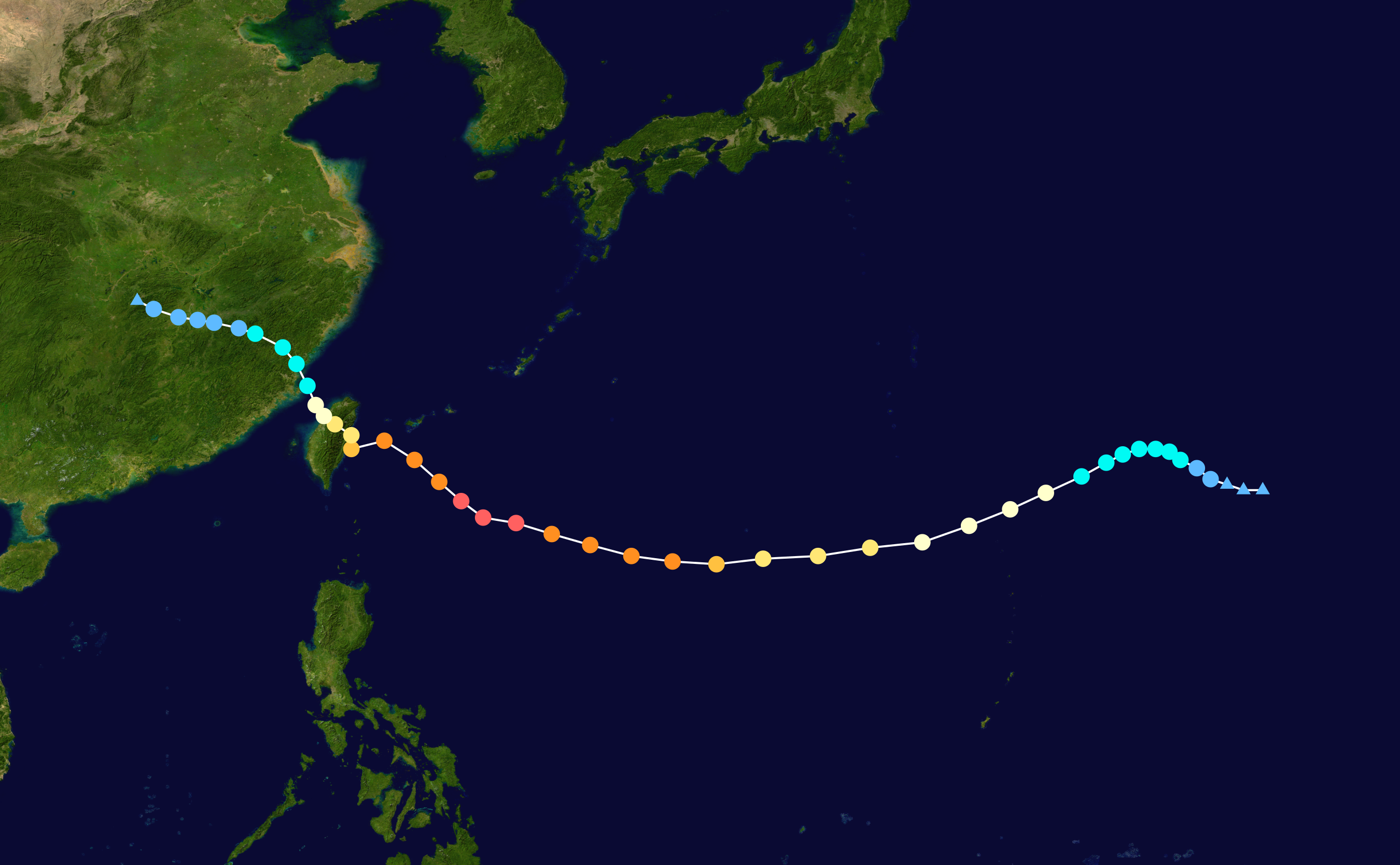
Map plotting the storm's track and intensity, according to the Saffir–Simpson scale Map key Saffir–Simpson scale Tropical depression (≤38 mph, ≤62 km/h) Tropical storm (39–73 mph, 63–118 km/h) Category 1 (74–95 mph, 119–153 km/h) Category 2 (96–110 mph, 154–177 km/h) Category 3 (111–129 mph, 178–208 km/h) Category 4 (130–156 mph, 209–251 km/h) Category 5 (≥157 mph, ≥252 km/h) Unknown Storm type Tropical cyclone Subtropical cyclone Extratropical cyclone, remnant low, tropical disturbance, or monsoon depression

The system formed on the evening of July 11 as a poorly organized depression about 280 km (150 nmi) west of Marcus Island, Japan at 1200 UTC (2100 JST). By 1800 UTC (0300 JST July 13), it had reached a high, destructive tropical storm strength and was named Haitang. (Note: The name Haitang (Mandarin: 海棠, [xaɪ˧˩˧ tʰɑŋ˧˥]) was contributed by China and refers to the crabapple tree (Malus spectabilis) in Mandarin.) It grew to typhoon strength at 1800 UTC (0300 JST July 14) the following day. As it moved westward it continued to gain in strength, intensifying into a Category 3 as it entered the Philippine area of responsibility. Philippine Atmospheric, Geophysical and Astronomical Services Administration (PAGASA) named the storm Feria for Philippine warnings on July 15. By July 16, the storm continued tracking west and became a threat to Taiwan and Japan's Sakishima Islands. Haitang strengthened into a Category 5 super typhoon. On July 17 it weakened to a Category 3 as it continued west, sparing Sakishima a direct hit but aiming directly for Taiwan. Haitang made landfall near Hualien City, Taiwan at 0000 UTC (0800 NST) on the morning of July 18. Taking a full day to cross the island and it caused flash floods and landslides as it passed over the interior mountains. Weakening to a tropical storm as it entered the South China Sea, it reorganized into a minimal typhoon as it approached the southeast China coast. Haitang made landfall for the second time near Wenzhou. China on July 19 at 1200 UTC (2000 CST). Moving inland, it rapidly lost its strength and dissipated. PAGASA stopped issuing advisories for the storm near Jiangxi on July 20.

== Impact ==
=== Taiwan ===
In Taiwan, 2 women were found dead east of Taipei, a man was killed by falling rocks, and a fourth victim was swept away by water while fishing. Businesses and schools across Taiwan were ordered closed on July 18 due to the typhoon. More than 1,500 people had been evacuated, mostly from northern Taiwan, and signs of devastation could be seen such as uprooted trees, high waves and loss of electric power.

=== Mainland China ===
An estimated 15 million people were affected by the typhoon. A total of 2,151 homes were destroyed, 262.9 km (163.4 mi) of roads were washed out and several thousand power lines were downed by the storm Damage to infrastructure amounted to ¥8 billion (US$1.17 billion).

== See also ==
- Other tropical cyclones named Haitang
- Other tropical cyclones named Feria
- List of wettest tropical cyclones
- Timeline of the 2005 Pacific typhoon season
- Typhoon Soulik (2013)
- Tropical Storm Trami (2013)
- Typhoon Nepartak (2016)
- Typhoon Herb
- Typhoon Soudelor (2015)
- Typhoon Longwang - Another powerful typhoon to hit Taiwan after Haitang
- Typhoon Gaemi
