= Typhoon Matsa =

Pacific typhoon in 2005

Typhoon Matsa (Gorio)
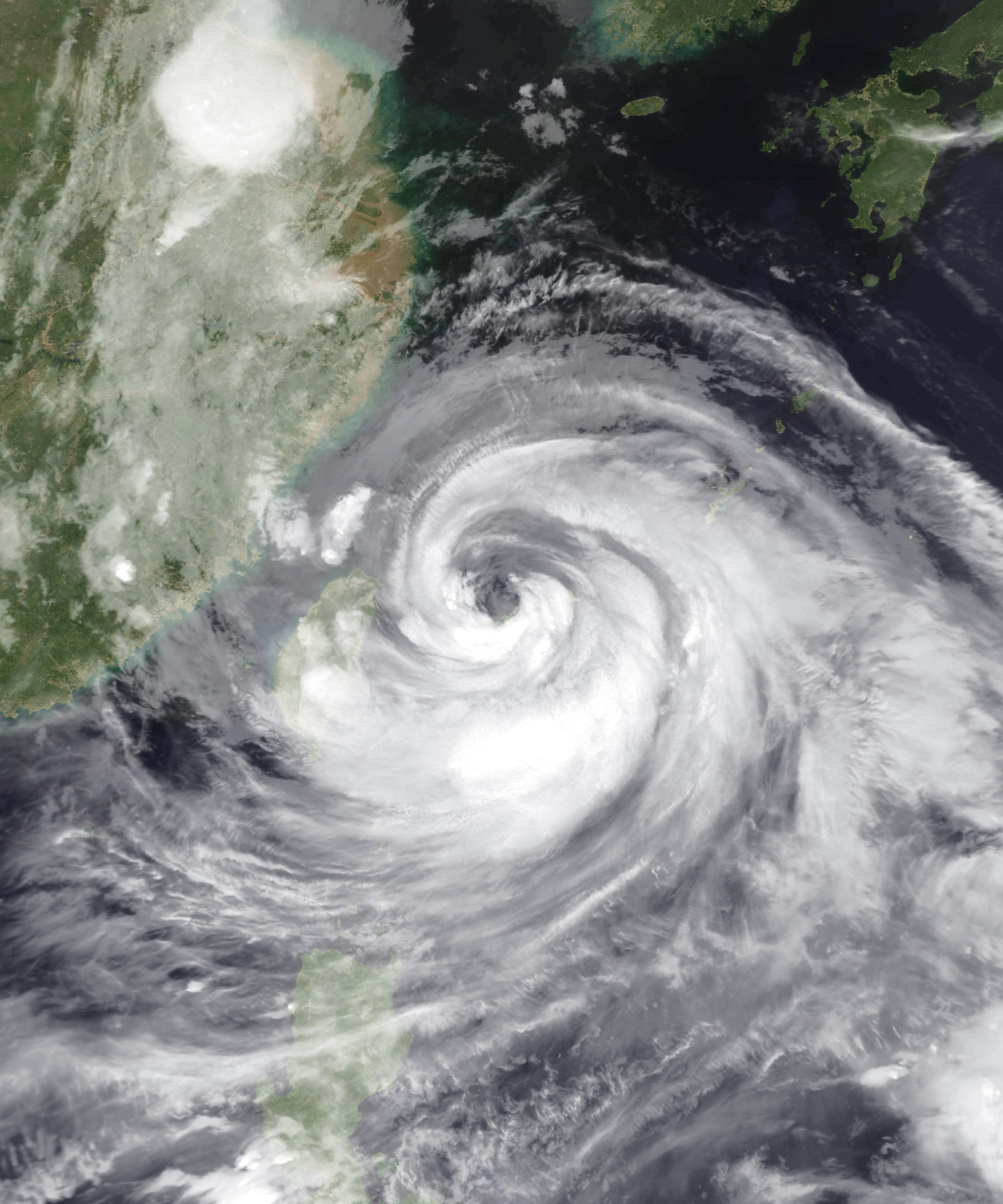
- Typhoon Matsa at peak intensity on August 4

Meteorological history
- Formed: July 29, 2005
- Extratropical: August 7, 2005
- Dissipated: August 9, 2005

Typhoon
- 10-minute sustained (JMA)
- Highest winds: 150 km/h (90 mph)
- Lowest pressure: 950 hPa (mbar); 28.05 inHg

Category 2-equivalent typhoon
- 1-minute sustained (SSHWS/JTWC)
- Highest winds: 165 km/h (105 mph)
- Lowest pressure: 954 hPa (mbar); 28.17 inHg

Overall effects
- Fatalities: 25 total
- Damage: $2.23 billion (2005 USD)
- Areas affected: Taiwan, China, Korea, Japan
- IBTrACS
- Part of the 2005 Pacific typhoon season

Typhoon Matsa, (Note: The name Matsa (Lao: ມັດສາ, [mat˧ saː˩]) was contributed by Laos and refers to the Suvannamaccha mermaid in Lao.) known in the Philippines as Typhoon Gorio, was the second of eight Pacific tropical cyclones to make landfall on China during the 2005 Pacific typhoon season. The ninth tropical storm and fifth typhoon of the season, Matsa developed on July 30 to the east of the Philippines. Matsa intensified as it tracked northwestward, and attained peak 10-minute sustained winds of 150 km/h (93 mph) near Taiwan before weakening and striking the Chinese province of Zhejiang on August 5. The system continued northward into the Yellow Sea, and on August 7 Matsa became extratropical after again moving ashore along the Liaodong Peninsula.

In Taiwan, Matsa dropped torrential rainfall of up to 1,270 mm (50 in), which caused mudslides and moderate damage across the island. Flooding from the rainfall contaminated some water supplies, leaving around 80,000 homes without water at one point; much of Taoyuan County (now Taoyuan City) was without water for at least 5 days. As in Taiwan, the typhoon dropped heavy precipitation in the People's Republic of China, and in combination with strong winds destroyed about 59,000 houses and damaged more than 20,000 km^{2} (7,700 sq mi) of croplands. Throughout the country, Matsa caused 25 direct fatalities and ¥18 billion (2005 CNY, $2.23 billion 2005 USD) in damage.

== Meteorological history ==
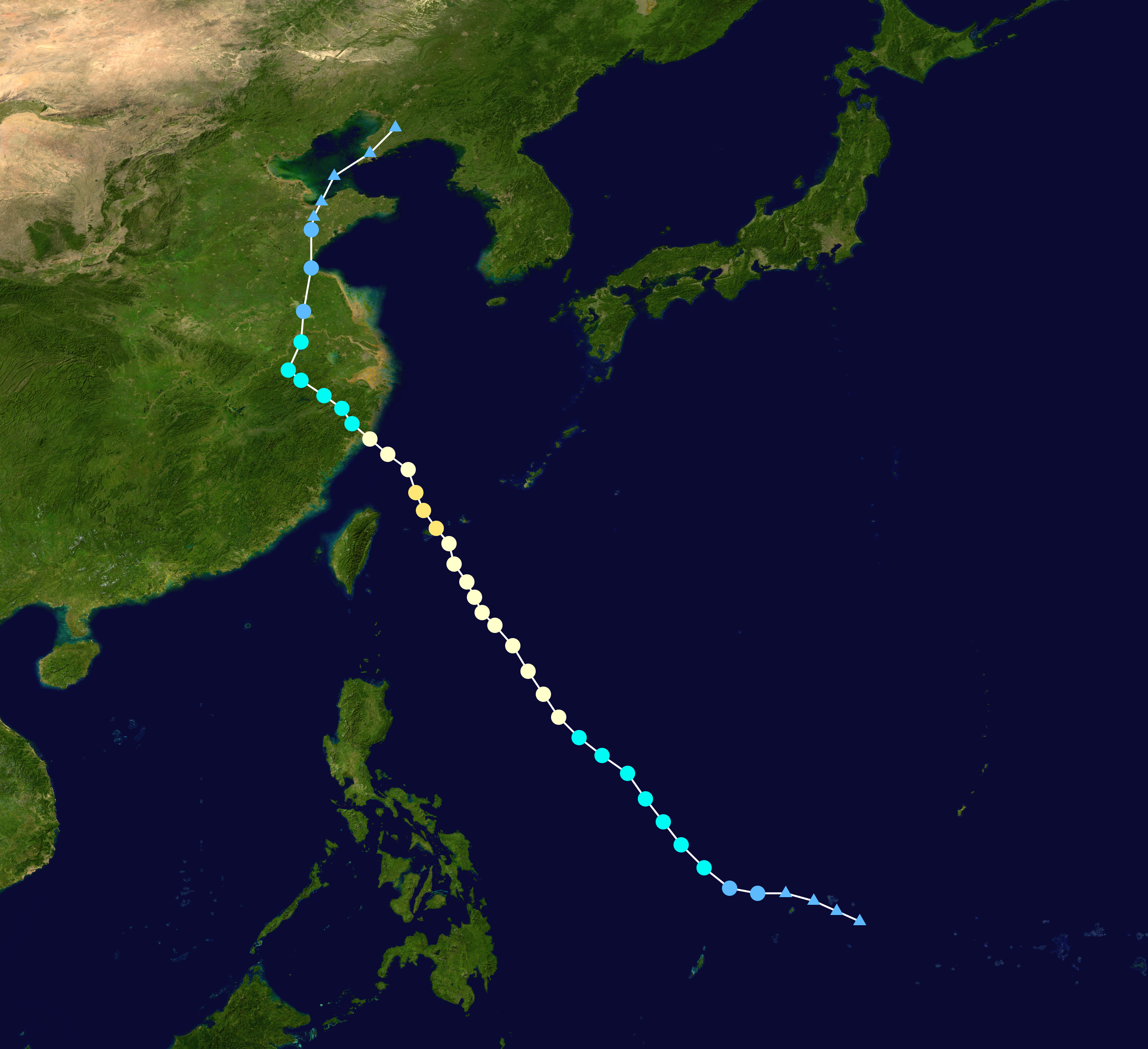
Map plotting the storm's track and intensity, according to the Saffir–Simpson scale Map key Saffir–Simpson scale Tropical depression (≤38 mph, ≤62 km/h) Tropical storm (39–73 mph, 63–118 km/h) Category 1 (74–95 mph, 119–153 km/h) Category 2 (96–110 mph, 154–177 km/h) Category 3 (111–129 mph, 178–208 km/h) Category 4 (130–156 mph, 209–251 km/h) Category 5 (≥157 mph, ≥252 km/h) Unknown Storm type Tropical cyclone Subtropical cyclone Extratropical cyclone, remnant low, tropical disturbance, or monsoon depression

The origin of Typhoon Matsa is traced to the formation of an area of convection about 185 km (115 mi) east of Yap in late July. The convection gradually consolidated over a weak low-level circulation, and at 0300 UTC on July 30 the system was first mentioned in the Joint Typhoon Warning Center (JTWC) Significant Tropical Weather Outlook. Located within an area of moderate wind shear, the system continued to slowly organize, and by 1200 UTC on July 30 it was sufficiently organized for the Japan Meteorological Agency (JMA) to classify it as a weak tropical depression while located about 65 km (40 mi) east of Yap. Shortly thereafter, the JTWC followed suit by issuing a tropical cyclone formation alert. The depression tracked steadily westward, followed by a turn to the northwest on July 31 under the influence of a mid-level ridge to its east. It continued to organize, and at 1200 UTC on July 31 it intensified into Tropical Storm Matsa; the depression was unofficially classified a tropical storm six hours earlier by the JTWC. Additionally, the Philippine Atmospheric, Geophysical and Astronomical Services Administration (PAGASA) named the system Tropical Storm Gorio, due to its location within the administration's area of responsibility.

Tropical Storm Matsa gradually intensified as it tracked steadily northwestward; by late on August 1 it strengthened into a severe tropical storm. Outflow and deep convection to the north remained limited, though the storm was able to intensity further to attain typhoon status on August 2 about 780 km (480 mi) south of Okinawa. Intensification slowed, and late on August 3 Matsa reached a peak intensity of 150 km/h (93 mph) while located 495 km (308 mi) east of the southern tip of Taiwan as reported by the JMA; the JTWC and the National Meteorological Center of China reported the typhoon as strengthening further to attain peak winds of 165 km/h (103 mph) on August 4. Shortly after passing over the Japanese island of Ishigaki, Matsa began to weaken steadily as it approached the coast of China, and made landfall as a minimal typhoon late on August 5 near Yuhuan in the southern region of Zhejiang Province. It crossed the Gulf of Yueqing and 40 minutes after its first landfall it struck Mainland China near Yueqing. It quickly weakened to a tropical storm, and within hours of moving ashore the JTWC issued its last advisory. Matsa turned to the north, weakening to a tropical depression on August 7 shortly before entering the Yellow Sea. The weakening depression continued northward, and became an extratropical cyclone on August 9 after hitting the Liaodong Peninsula.

== Preparations ==
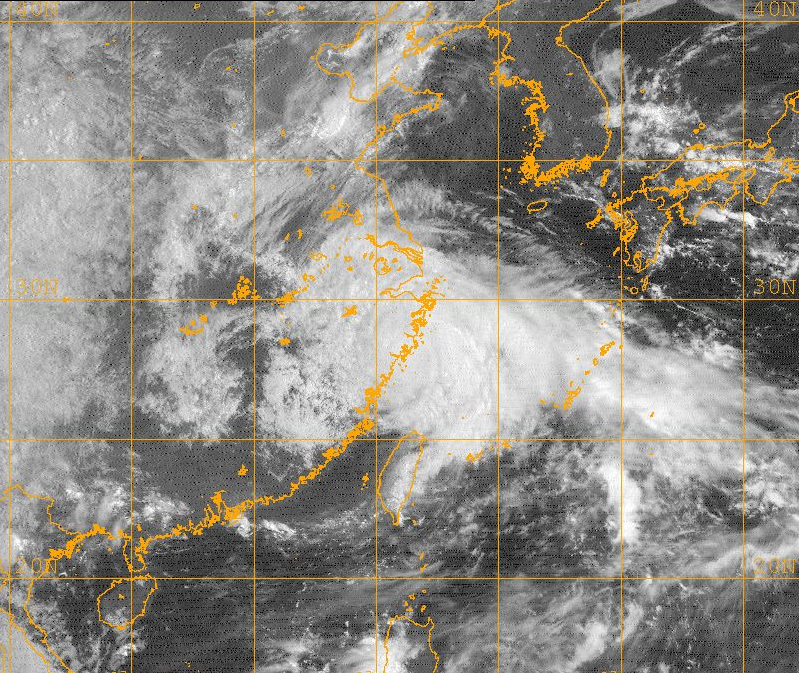
Typhoon Matsa making landfall on August 6

The Taiwan Central Weather Bureau warned for the potential for heavy amounts of rainfall across the island. This resulted in officials to close schools and offices in Taipei. Additionally, the typhoon caused the cancellation or delay of several flights in and out of Taipei, though complete air service was restored by the day after Matsa's passage. The Taiwan Stock Exchange closed due to the threat of the typhoon.

Prior to the arrival of the typhoon, officials in China ordered the evacuation of about 2.3 million people, mostly in Zhejiang. The typhoon also resulted in the cancellation or delay of thousands of flights, with the two main airports in Shanghai closed for 30 hours. Officials near Matsa's projected landfall were advised to lower the levels in reservoirs to mitigate the threat of flooding. In Zhejiang, officials set up shelters for about 35,000 boats to prevent marine damage. Due to the potential for rough seas, officials closed the port at Ningbo and Shanghai and also canceled some ferry service. Matsa was predicted to be first typhoon to affect Beijing in 11 years by dropping heavy amounts of rainfall. Local officials advised water operators to lower water levels to prevent flooding. Up to 100 mm (3.9 in) of rainfall was forecast for the city, and officials prepared to evacuate 40,000 residents in the outskirts of the city.

== Impact ==
=== Taiwan ===
While passing to the north of Taiwan, Matsa produced strong winds reaching 144 km/h (89 mph), with gusts of up to 188 km/h (117 mph). The storm dropped heavy rainfall across the island, with precipitation totals reaching up to 1,270 mm (50 in) in a 30‑hour period; one station located in Taitung County recorded 843 mm (33.2 in) in one day, which was the highest daily rainfall total in association with the storm. The rainfall led to flooding and mudslides throughout the island. In response to the flooding, residents placed sandbags around houses and office buildings to prevent flood damage. The mudslides blocked roads across the mountainous region, leaving hundreds stranded, and in combination with flooding the mudslides washed away several bridges and damaged some roadways. Strong winds left 56,211 houses without power, most of which were quickly repaired. Typhoon Matsa caused moderate crop damage across the island, which was still recovering from the damage caused by Typhoon Haitang a month before. More than 80,000 homes were left without water due to the passage of the typhoon. Subsequent flooding left more than 630,000 homes without water or receiving water at infrequent intervals. About 368 hectares (910 acres) of crop fields were destroyed, and crop damage from Matsa totaled NT$47 million (2005 TWD, $1.5 million 2005 USD). According to the Taiwan Council of Agriculture, the banana and pear crops were the worst affected.

=== China ===
Deaths and damage by province
Region	Deaths	Damage (2005 CNY)	Damage (2005 USD)
Zhejiang	5	8.9 billion	$1.1 billion
Shanghai	7	1.3 billion	$165 million
Jiangsu	8	3.4 billion	$420 million
Anhui	2	660 million	$81 million
Shandong	0	2.9 billion	$358 million
Liaoning	3	600 million	$74 million
Hebei	0	170 million	$21 million
Total	25	18 billion	$2.23 billion

Upon making landfall in China, several coastal locations reported winds in excess of 120 km/h (75 mph), with wind gusts peaking at 175 km/h (109 mph). Further inland, winds reached 147 km/h (91 mph) at Shanghai, the highest wind gust on record in the city. The storm produced heavy amounts of rainfall, reaching a maximum of 701 mm (27.6 in) at a station in Yongjia County. Extreme amounts of precipitation fell in short durations, including 91 mm (3.6 in) in just 1 hour and 200 mm (7.9 in) in 3 hours at Dinghai District. Just days after a previous heavy rainfall event, the rainfall from Matsa caused record-breaking river flooding along eight Chinese rivers, including a station at a floodgate on Suzhou Creek which peaked at 4.55 m (14.9 ft).

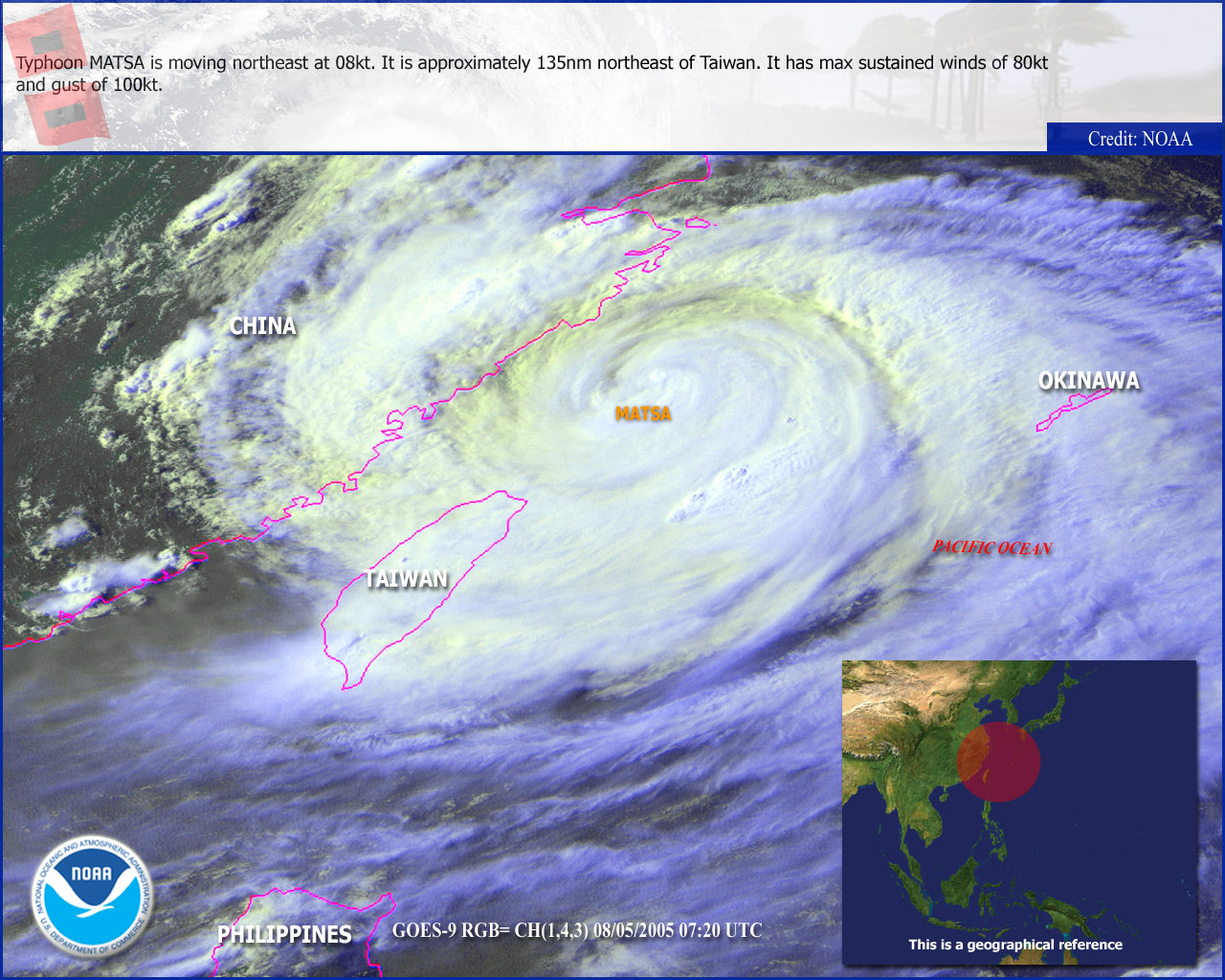
Matsa on August 5

In Zhejiang, where Matsa made landfall, high storm tides occurred along the coastline. In some areas, water levels rose quickly, with some coastal homes experiencing flooding from the tide. Rough seas off of Ningbo capsized a fishing boat, leaving its three occupants missing. About two-thirds of the province reported more than 50 mm (2.0 in) of rainfall, resulting in flooding in low-lying areas as well as several mudslides, one of which killed two people. The combined effects of the winds and rains destroyed 21 reservoirs and more than 200 km (120 mi) of embankment, and damaged several water stations. Matsa damaged 3,380 km^{2} (1,310 sq mi) of crops, with around 224 km^{2} (86 sq mi) of cropland destroyed from the flooding. About 13,000 houses were destroyed in the province. Throughout Zhejiang, Matsa caused $8.9 billion (2005 CNY, $1.1 billion 2005 USD) in damage and five direct fatalities.

Heavy rainfall in Shanghai flooded 84 city streets; in some locations insufficient water drainage left homes and apartments flooded, with a total of 20,000 houses reporting flooding. The flooding also closed the city subway system for a few hours. Strong winds downed 2,700 trees and 400 power lines in the city. The typhoon damaged a construction site in the city, leaving three injured and one person killed. Throughout the city an estimated 15,000 houses were destroyed. Additionally, four people were electrocuted as a result of the flooding. In Shanghai alone, damage totaled $1.33 billion (2005 CNY, $164.5 million 2005 USD); seven people died in the city.

Despite the anticipated effects, Beijing experienced only light rainfall. Throughout China, over 31 million people were affected in over eight provinces. Typhoon Matsa left the agricultural industry severely impacted, with over 20,000 km^{2} (7,700 sq mi) damaged. The combination of its winds and flooding damaged around 200,000 buildings, including a total of 59,000 destroyed houses. Damage in the country totaled about $18 billion (2005 CNY, $2.23 billion 2005 USD).

=== Okinawa and South Korea ===
Typhoon Matsa affected the southernmost Okinawa Prefecture, and produced peak wind gusts of 182 km/h (51 m/s; 113 mph) on Ishigaki. The storm dropped moderate to heavy rainfall across the region, peaking at 318 mm (12.5 in) on Miyako-jima.

The remnants of Matsa also affected South Korea, with moderate amounts of rainfall reaching 229 mm (9.0 in) in Masan.

== Aftermath ==
Subsequent to the passage of the typhoon in Taiwan, large quantities of mud and impurities entered and polluted the Shihmen Reservoir in Taoyuan County (now Taoyuan City), the county's primary source of water. Severe cloudiness occurred in the water, and at one time the reservoir recorded 25,000 nephelometric turbidity units. Such facilities are unable to operate with mud in the water, and in response, the Taiwan Water Corporation established temporary water stations to alleviate the situation, and the Pingting Water Treatment Plant worked to treat the problem. Furthermore, officials drilled wells to accommodate the shortage. Water supply in the southern portion of Taoyuan County was restored by five days after the storm, with supply restored to the northern portion of the county by ten days after the passage of the typhoon. The same problem had occurred previously after Typhoon Mindulle in July 2004. As a result of the crop damage, the Taiwan Council of Agriculture opened its reserve of frozen vegetables to prevent overharvesting of the existing crops. Despite the measures, crop prices reached record levels, which led to groups calling out for the government to stabilize the price of foods. In reaction, a member of the Council of Agriculture remarked that "vegetable prices [were] expected to go back to normal gradually ... as supplies increase[d]." The passage of the typhoon left hundreds of residents in Hsinchu County isolated from the outside world for four days. As a result, officials deployed helicopters with rescue supplies and returned with the injured. Aid from one internal organization totaled $NT300,000 (2005 TWD, $9,500 2005 USD). Shortly after the effects of the typhoon ended on the island, work began to repair and rebuild the impacted bridges and roads. Electricians quickly began restoring power across northern Taiwan; by the day after the typhoon's passage, the number of houses without power decreased by 90%.

In the People's Republic of China, members of the People's Liberation Army assisted in search and rescue operations. Officials called for about 100,000 citizens in Shanghai for work in disaster control and distribution of relief aid, with some providing relief supplies to flooded areas by inflatable rafts. Within a month, Typhoons Talim and Khanun also affected the same area, further compounding the effects of Matsa. During the 38th Session of the World Meteorological Organization in Hanoi, Vietnam, the name Matsa was retired; during the next session, the name Pakhar was nominated as its replacement. It was first used in the 2012 season.

== See also ==
- Other tropical cyclones named Gorio
- Timeline of the 2005 Pacific typhoon season
- Typhoon Fitow
