= Typhoon Podul =

Pacific typhoon in 2025

Typhoon Podul (Gorio)
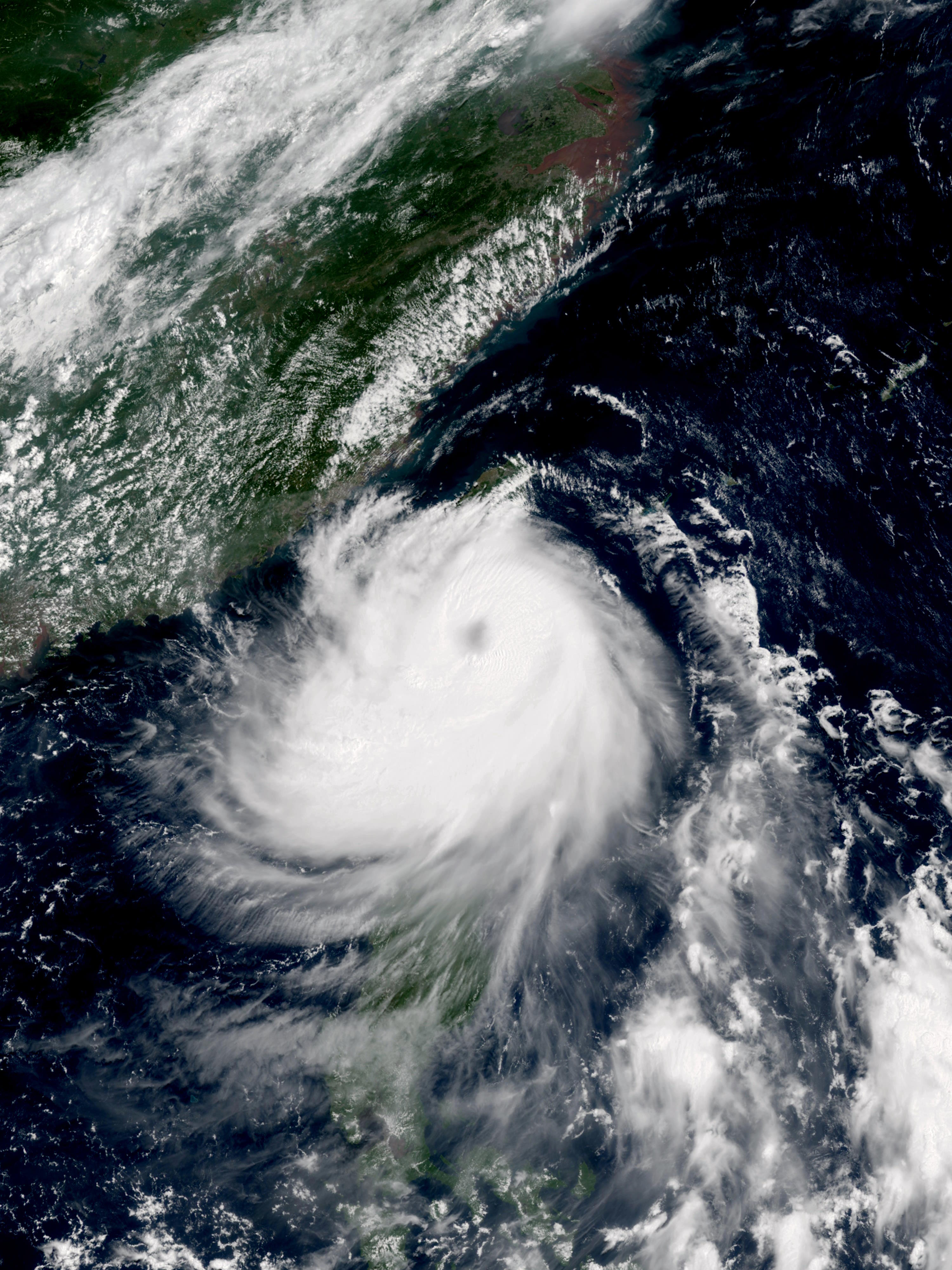
- Podul at its peak intensity while approaching Taitung County, Taiwan on August 13

Meteorological history
- Formed: August 5, 2025
- Dissipated: August 15, 2025

Typhoon
- 10-minute sustained (JMA)
- Highest winds: 150 km/h (90 mph)
- Lowest pressure: 960 hPa (mbar); 28.35 inHg

Category 2-equivalent typhoon
- 1-minute sustained (SSHWS/JTWC)
- Highest winds: 175 km/h (110 mph)
- Lowest pressure: 966 hPa (mbar); 28.53 inHg

Overall effects
- Fatalities: 2
- Injuries: 149
- Missing: 1
- Damage: >$332 million (2025 USD)
- Areas affected: Northern Mariana Islands, Philippines, Ryukyu Islands, Taiwan, East China, South China, Hong Kong, Macau, Vietnam
- IBTrACS
- Part of the 2025 Pacific typhoon season

Typhoon Podul, known in the Philippines as Typhoon Gorio, was a relatively compact but moderately strong tropical cyclone that impacted Taiwan and South China in mid-August 2025. The eleventh named storm and third typhoon of 2025 Pacific typhoon season, Podul originated from an area of convection approximately 230 nautical miles (430 km) northeast of Saipan in the Northern Mariana Islands. Guided west-northwestward by a subtropical ridge, the system gradually organized in an environment of warm sea surface temperatures, high ocean heat content, and low to moderate wind shear. On August 8, it strengthened into a tropical storm and assigned the name Podul from the Japan Meteorological Agency (JMA). Although strong northeasterly vertical wind shear and entrainment of dry air initially disrupted its core, Podul steadily consolidated, with deep convection and tighter convective banding around its low-level circulation center (LLCC). The JMA upgraded the system to a typhoon on August 9, followed by the Joint Typhoon Warning Center (JTWC) on August 12. Podul reached its peak intensity on August 13 as a Category 2-equivalent typhoon before making landfall in Taimali, Taitung County, Taiwan. After weakening over the Central Mountain Range, it crossed the Taiwan Strait as a severe tropical storm and made a second landfall in Zhangpu, Fujian Province, China.

In Taiwan, where the storm made its first landfall, over 8,000 people were evacuated. Heavy rainfall triggered flooding in several areas, while strong winds left more than 292,000 households without power. One death, 112 injuries, and a missing person were reported. Transport was heavily affected, with dozens of flights canceled or diverted at Taipei Taoyuan International Airport, where a UPS Airlines Boeing 747 cargo sustained an engine strike and was uncontrollable during landing in strong winds. In China's Guangdong province, authorities relocated around 75,000 residents from flood-prone areas as the storm brought heavy rainfall in Guangzhou.

== Meteorological history ==
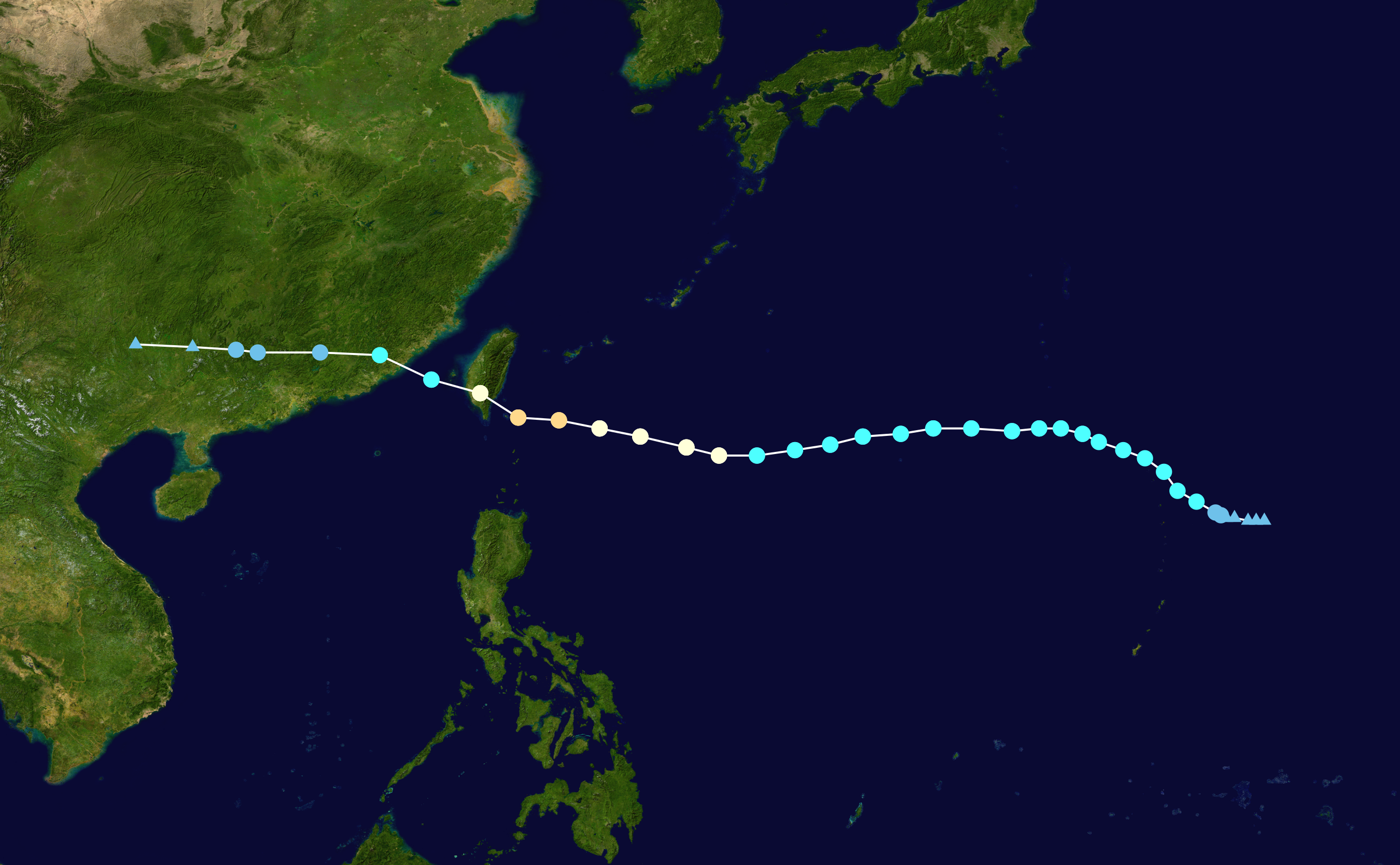
Map plotting the storm's track and intensity, according to the Saffir–Simpson scale Map key Saffir–Simpson scale Tropical depression (≤38 mph, ≤62 km/h) Tropical storm (39–73 mph, 63–118 km/h) Category 1 (74–95 mph, 119–153 km/h) Category 2 (96–110 mph, 154–177 km/h) Category 3 (111–129 mph, 178–208 km/h) Category 4 (130–156 mph, 209–251 km/h) Category 5 (≥157 mph, ≥252 km/h) Unknown Storm type Tropical cyclone Subtropical cyclone Extratropical cyclone, remnant low, tropical disturbance, or monsoon depression

On August 6, the JTWC began monitoring an area of disorganized convection located approximately 230 nautical miles (430 km) northeast of Saipan. Later that same day, the JMA also initiated tracking of the developing system, classifying it as a tropical depression based on improved low-level circulation and persistent convection. By August 7, the JTWC assessed that environmental conditions were conducive for further development, including warm sea surface temperatures and low to moderate vertical wind shear. As a result, the agency issued a Tropical Cyclone Formation Alert (TCFA), upgrading the system's development potential to high and noting that the system was likely to undergo tropical cyclogenesis in the near term. At 00:00 UTC, the JTWC upgraded the system to a tropical depression and designated it 16W. During the early hours of August 8, the system intensified further, prompting the JMA to upgrade it to a tropical storm and assign it the international name Podul. (Note: The name Podul (Korean: 버들, [pɔ̹dɯɭ]) was contributed by North Korea and means willow in Korean.) Initially, its LLCC remained partially exposed due to moderate to strong northeasterly vertical wind shear. However, over the subsequent 24 hours, the system gradually became more organized, with convection consolidating near the center and improved outflow aloft.

At 01:45 UTC on August 9, the JMA upgraded Podul to a typhoon as it tracked westward across the western North Pacific. This intensification occurred despite the presence of increasing vertical wind shear, as the storm's structure became more vertically aligned and sustained deep convection persisted near the center. Later that day, at 23:20 PHT (15:20 UTC), Podul entered the Philippine Area of Responsibility (PAR), at which point the Philippine Atmospheric, Geophysical and Astronomical Services Administration (PAGASA) assigned it the local name Gorio. At 11:45 PHT (03:45 UTC), the JMA downgraded Podul back into a severe tropical storm; however, the agency later upgraded back to a typhoon. At 22:00 UTC on August 12, the JTWC upgraded the storm to a minimal typhoon, as deep convection had begun to consolidate around the northern sector of the cyclone's circulation. However, a narrow intrusion of dry air continued to penetrate the central core, slightly disrupting the system's organization. On August 13, JTWC upgraded Podul to a Category 2-equivalent typhoon as animated radar imagery revealed a well-defined eye, surrounded by a robust burst of deep convection. At around 13:00 TST (05:00 UTC), Podul made landfall over Taimali in Taitung County, Taiwan. Later, the rugged terrain of the southern portion of the Central Mountain Range had made Podul weakened significantly after landfall. It then reemerged through the Taiwan Strait at around 16:00 CST (08:00 UTC). The storm continued to deteriorate before it made a second landfall over Zhangpu County, Zhangzhou, Fujian Province in China on August 14. Afterwards, the JTWC made its final warning as it moved inland, while the JMA continues to track Podul as it weakened into tropical storm. The JMA further downgraded it to a tropical depression until ceasing all advisories on August 15 as it dissipated over Hunan Province.

== Preparations ==
=== Northern Mariana Islands ===
Although no direct impact was expected in the islands, a tropical storm watch was issued over Agrihan, Pagan, and Alamagan, citing that gale-force conditions with maximum sustained winds of 39 mph (34 kn; 63 km/h) or more are possible. However, it was later lifted as Podul continued to move westward.

=== Philippines ===
While a significant impact was not expected in the country, PAGASA hoisted a Tropical Cyclone Wind Signal No. 1 warning in Batanes on August 12, as the storm was expected to bring minor impacts in the area. On August 13, the agency later upgraded it to Signal No. 2 in Itbayat, while Signal No. 1 was raised for the remainder part of Batanes. Flights going to Basco and Itbayat were canceled‌ as Podul neared the province. All warnings were later lifted as the storm moved away from the country.

=== Taiwan ===
Satellite animation of Typhoon Podul making landfall over Taitung County, Taiwan on August 13

Some maritime transport routes operated by the Maritime and Port Bureau (MPB) and the Kinmen County Harbor Bureau were suspended on August 12 and 13, as a precautionary measure ahead of the arrival of Podul. The suspensions affected ferry and shipping services in vulnerable coastal areas, particularly those in the projected path of the storm. Taiwan-based airlines, including Mandarin Airlines and Uni Air, announced the cancellation‌ of all domestic flights scheduled for August 13. Daily Air also reported the cancellation‌ of several domestic flights due to anticipated severe weather conditions. In addition, numerous international flights operated by Taiwan's China Airlines and Tigerair Taiwan were suspended on the same day. EVA Air confirmed that all flights to and from Kaohsiung International Airport were either canceled or rescheduled due to safety concerns. However, operations at Taipei Songshan Airport and Taoyuan International Airport remained partially active, with some flights also affected by delays and cancellations‌.

In response to the approaching typhoon, the Central Weather Administration issued both land warning for multiple counties and municipalities, including the counties of Changhua, Hualien, Nantou, Taitung and Pingtung, and Kaohsiung. The warning indicated that these areas were expected to be directly impacted by the eye of Typhoon Podul prior to its landfall. A sea warning was also issued, citing the possibility of waves reaching up to 5 m (16 ft) along the west coast south of Changhua, as well as the eastern coasts of Hualien and Taitung. As a precautionary measure, more than 5,500 residents were evacuated from high-risk areas, particularly in southern and eastern Taiwan. Local authorities coordinated emergency shelters and implemented safety protocols to accommodate displaced individuals. In total, 252 domestic flights and 129 international flights were canceled due to the adverse weather conditions brought by Podul. Additionally, local governments across various regions announced class and work suspensions on August 13 as part of their preparedness measures, urging citizens to stay indoors and avoid unnecessary travel during the typhoon's passage.

=== China ===
In Xiamen, Fujian, six flights going to and from the Gaoqi International Airport were canceled, and several high-speed rail lines were suspended from service on August 13 and 14 ahead of the preparation of Podul. In Chaozhou, Guangdong, operations at all schools, daycare centers, and educational training institutions were temporarily halted to ensure safety from Podul. Maritime activities were also suspended as the typhoon approached the province.

=== Elsewhere ===
In Hong Kong, at 08:40 HKT (00:40 UTC) on August 13, the Hong Kong Observatory (HKO) issued Standby Signal No. 1 as the storm neared the territory. It was lowered at 12:20 HKT (04:20 UTC) the following day. Fifteen flights between Hong Kong and Taiwan were canceled‌, in addition to one operated by HK Express to Ishigaki, in the Ryukyu Islands, and another by Greater Bay Airlines to Quanzhou in Fujian.

== Impact and aftermath ==
=== Taiwan ===
A total of 112 people were injured as Podul brushed through the country. Heavy rainfall from the typhoon caused flooding in several areas, including roads, nearby houses, and Kenting National Park in Hengchun. A man in Kaohsiung died after falling while repairing a storm-damaged roof. More than 292,000 households lost power nationwide. A 28-year-old man was reported missing after being swept away by waves while fishing with a friend in Budai, Chiayi County. It was later found out that the man had died. At Taipei Taoyuan International Airport, 64 passenger and cargo flights were canceled, and 26 flights were diverted to nearby airports as of 15:19 TST (07:19 UTC). A Boeing 747 cargo, operated by UPS Airlines, suffered an engine damage while attempting to land during strong gusts and wind shear at Taoyuan International Airport. The north runway was temporarily closed for repairs and debris removal but reopened for dual-runway operations at 23:38 TST (15:38 UTC).

Taiwan's Republic of China Air Force deployed an aircraft to transport stranded travellers from Kinmen to Kaohsiung.

=== Hong Kong ===
Although Podul indirectly impacted the territory, the HKO issued the black rainstorm signal at 07:50 HKT (23:50 UTC) on August 14, the fifth instance of the year, following the red rainstorm signal in the early hours, citing that severe rainstorm had affected Lantau Island, the central business district, and several nearby districts, until it was downgraded to the red rainstorm signal at 11:10 HKT (03:10 UTC). The red signal in the early morning led to the announcement of the suspension of morning and full-day classes and members the public were urged to remain on high alert and take necessary precautions. The Airport Authority said rainfall at the intensity of 300 millimetres per hour (12 in/h) was recorded on the island of Chek Lap Kok. Landing of aircraft has since been assigned only to the north and south runways (07L/25R and 07R/25L) and not to the center runway because of damages to ILS equipment. On August 13, the HKO issued Standby Signal No. 1 at 08:40 HKT (00:40 UTC) before halting it the next day at 12:40 HKT (04:40 UTC).

=== Macau ===
In Macau, heavy rainfall from the storm's outer bands caused localized flooding on the afternoon of August 14, prompting the issuance of the Black Rainstorm Signal, the closure of several schools, and the temporary shutdown of some roads and low-lying areas in Taipa, Coloane and Cotai. According to the Meteorological and Geophysical Bureau (SMG), the storm indirectly brought up to 110 mm (4.3 inches) of rain to certain parts of the territory over a short period, significantly disrupting daily activities and public transport services.

=== Vietnam ===
The remnants of Podul, alongside a low-pressure area in the South China Sea, also brought heavy rain in Northern Vietnam from August 14 to 15.

=== China ===
In Guangdong, 75,000 individuals were evacuated from low-lying areas as Podul brought 622.6 mm (24.5 inches) of rainfall in Guangzhou. Two people were died by Podul. Combined with Typhoon Kajiki and Tropical Storm Nongfa later, total damage by typhoons in China in August (including Podul) reached 2.23 billion yuan (US$313 million).

== See also ==
- Weather of 2025
- Tropical cyclones in 2025
- Typhoons in Taiwan
