= Weather of 2005 =

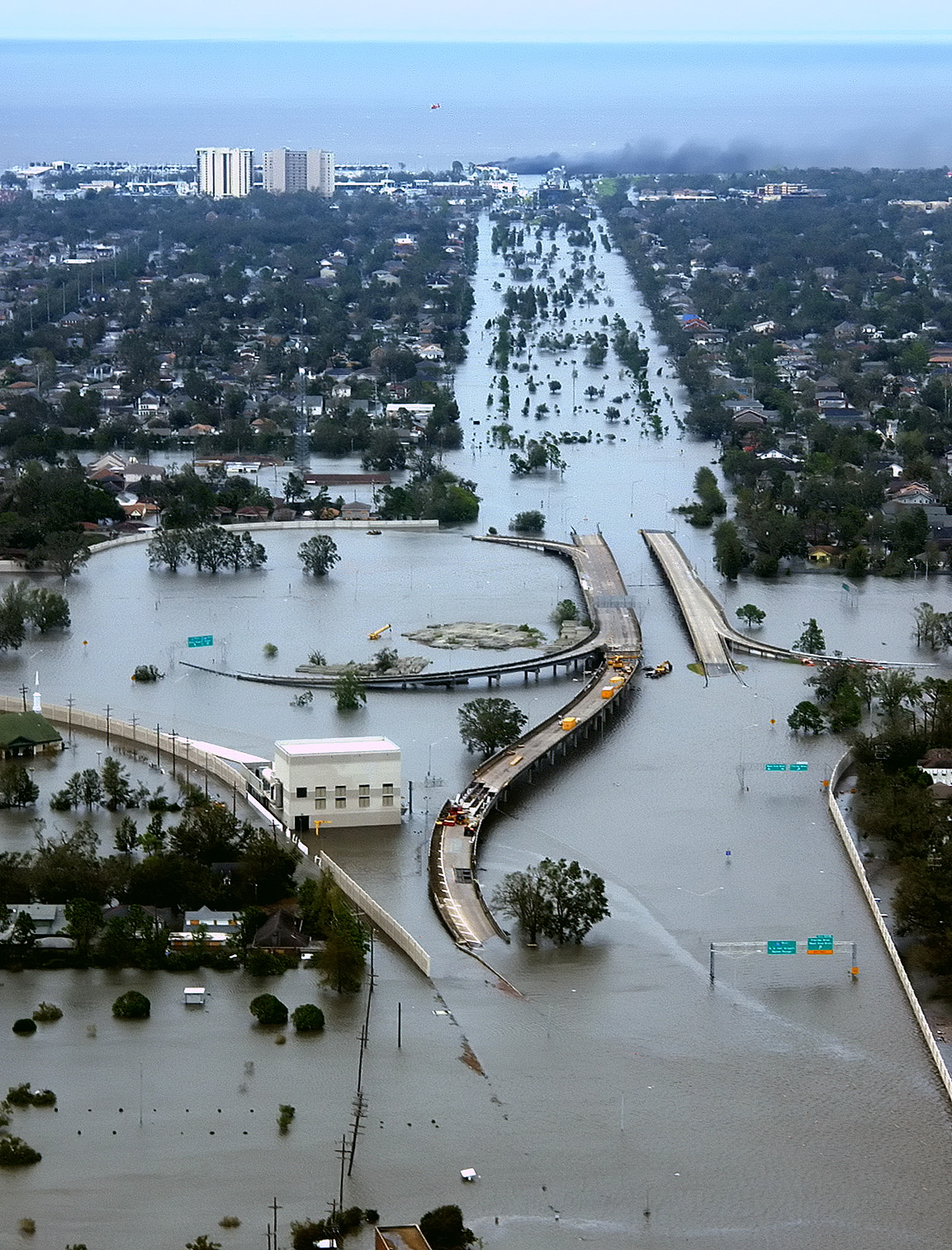
Flooded portions of New Orleans, Louisiana caused by Hurricane Katrina in August 2005

The following is a list of weather events that occurred on Earth in the year 2005. The year began with a weak El Niño, although this would fade into a neutral phase later in the year. The most common weather events to have a significant impact are blizzards, cold waves, droughts, heat waves, wildfires, floods, tornadoes, and tropical cyclones.

== Overview ==
=== Deadliest events ===
Deadliest meteorological events during 2005
Rank	Event	Date(s)	Deaths (+Missing)	Refs
1	Hurricane Stan	October	1,668	
2	Hurricane Katrina	August	1,392	

== Types ==
The following listed different types of special weather conditions worldwide.

=== Heat waves and droughts ===
During early to mid-July, in the southwestern United States, a significant heat wave hit the region. Nevada, Arizona, California, and southern Utah saw numerous record-breaking temperatures. On July 19, Las Vegas broke the all-time record high temperature, hitting 117 °F (47 °C). Death Valley saw 7 consecutive days (July 14-20) with temperatures higher than 125 °F (51 °C). By July 25, the heat wave hit the East Coast. The heat wave caused 13 fatalities.

In January, severe to extreme drought affected 4% of the United States. Much of the Pacific Northwest, northern Rockies, northern High Plains, Southeast, and parts of New England was dry. In February, severe to extreme drought affected 7% of the United States. The Pacific Northwest saw record dryness, as February marked the fourth consecutive month of drought conditions in the region. Parts of the Southeast, Mid-Atlantic, northern and central Rockies, and the High Plains was also dry. In March, severe to extreme drought affected 8% of the United States. The Pacific Northwest and northern Rockies was wetter than normal, breaking the four-month-long drought. The month was drier than normal across a wide swath from the southern Plains to the Great Lakes.

=== Tropical cyclones ===
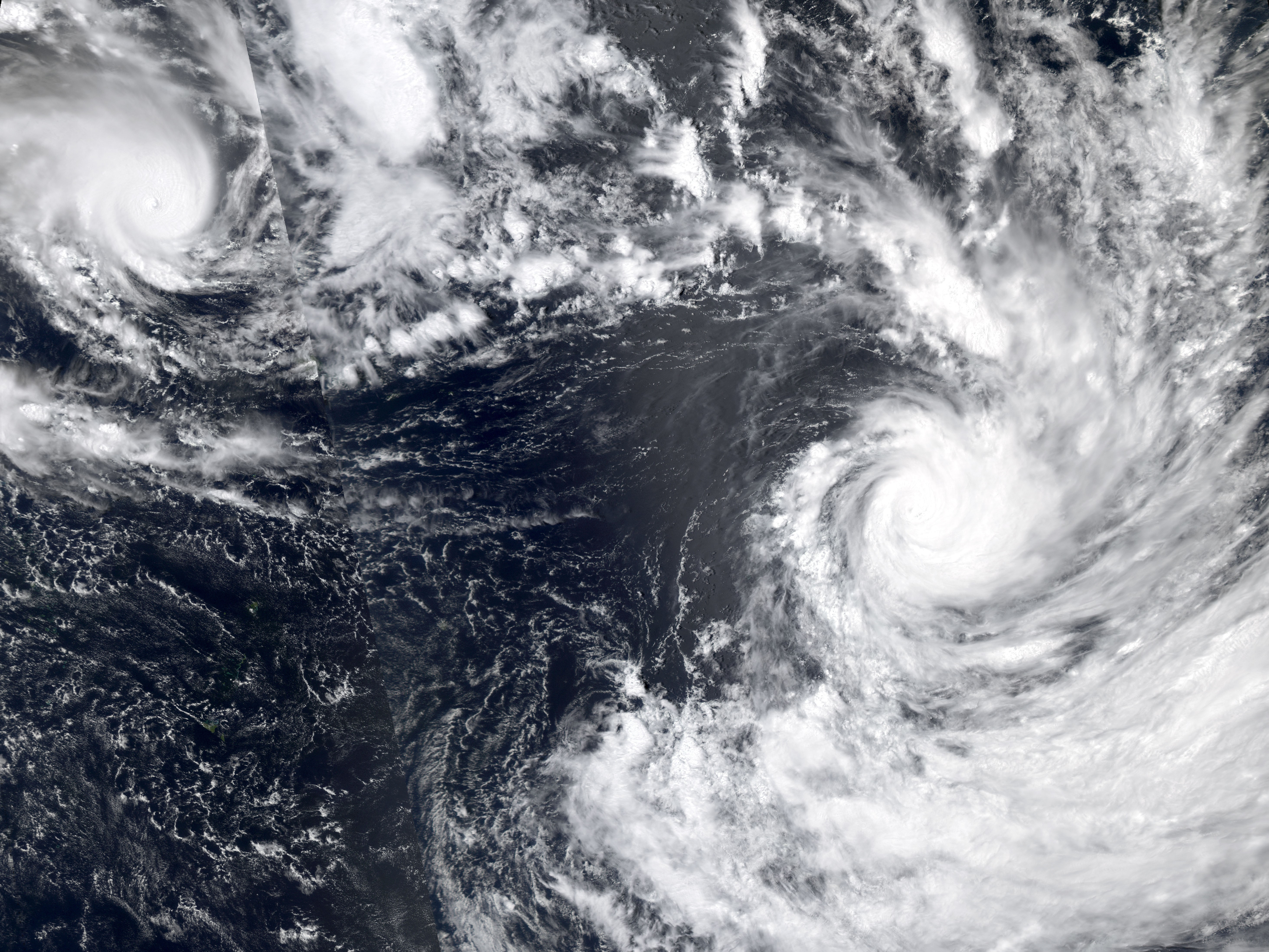
Tropical Cyclones Nancy (right) and Olaf (left) on February 14, part of a succession of tropical cyclones in the south Pacific that struck the Cook Islands

When the year began, a tropical low was active near the northwest coast of Australia, which soon became the first named storm of the year – Tropical Cyclone Raymond, which soon moved ashore the Kimberley region. Throughout the year, there were a total of nine named storms in the Australian basin. The strongest and most notable of these was powerful Cyclone Ingrid, which made landfalls in Queensland, Northern Territory, and Western Australia, the only cyclone on record to strike all three regions as a severe tropical cyclone. Two Australian storms entered the South-West Indian Ocean, where an additional six named storms developed. Also in the Southern Hemisphere, the South Pacific was active with eight named storms, including a succession of four cyclones that struck the Cook Islands – Meena, Nancy, Olaf, and Percy. The four cyclones' monetary damage totaled over US$25 million, equivalent to 14% of the country's gross domestic product (GDP).

The two deadliest tropical cyclones of the year were a part of the record-breaking 2005 Atlantic hurricane season. In October, Hurricane Stan and a broader weather system produced severe flooding across eastern Mexico and Central America, killing 1,668 people, with Guatemala hit the hardest. In late August, Hurricane Katrina became the costliest U.S. hurricane, leaving $125 billion in damage (Note: All damage totals are in 2005 values of their respective currencies.) and 1,392 deaths. The strongest tropical cyclone of the year was Hurricane Wilma, which in October became the most intense Atlantic hurricane ever recorded, with a barometric pressure of 882 mbar (26.0 inHg). Wilma was one of four Category 5 hurricanes – the strongest ranking on the Saffir-Simpson scale – in the hyperactive season, along with Emily, Katrina, and Rita. The 2005 Atlantic hurricane season was the most active season on record, with 28 named storms in the Atlantic, including an unnamed subtropical storm, as well as Zeta, which developed in December and continued into early January 2006.

Also, in the Northern Hemisphere, there were 23 named storms in the western Pacific Ocean, including 13 typhoons, of which Haitang was the strongest. In the eastern Pacific, there were 15 named storms, of which Kenneth was the strongest and longest-lived. In the North Indian Ocean, there were four named storms, although none of them intensified beyond a cyclonic storm, or roughly a weak tropical storm.

== Timeline ==
This is a timeline of deadly weather events during 2005.

=== January ===
- January 16–25 – Cyclone Ernest struck southern Madagascar after previously moving around the northern and western portions of the country, killing 78 people.

=== March ===
- March 1–August 31 – A drought across the American Midwest caused US2.4 billion worth of crop damage.
- March 2–15 – Heavy rains in Madagascar left 8,000 people homeless and caused 25 fatalities.
- March 4–16 – Cyclone Ingrid became the first ever severe tropical cyclone to make landfalls in the Australian subdivisions of Queensland, Northern Territory, and Western Australia. In its formative stages, high waves from the cyclone killed five people when a boat capsized off Papua New Guinea.
- March 10 – Inclement weather caused boat accidents that killed 29 people.
- March 12–19 – Tropical Storm Roke, known locally as Auring, moved through the central Philippines, killing 18 people.
- March 24–26 – Floods in the Malagasy province of Anosy killed four people.

=== May ===
- May 12 – Floods caused a fatality in the Autonomous Region in Muslim Mindanao in the southern Philippines.
- May 17–21 – Tropical Depression Adrian struck the Pacific coast of Honduras after weakening from hurricane intensity, killing five people across Central America.

=== June ===
- June 8–13 – Tropical Storm Arlene struck the Florida panhandle, causing one drowning death.
- June 27–July 5 – A land depression moved across India, producing flooding across Madhya Pradesh that killed 26 people.
- June 28–30 – Tropical Storm Bret struck the Mexican state of Veracruz, killing two people.

=== July ===
- July 3–7 Hurricane Cindy killed three people as it moved through the southeast United States. Cindy produced an outbreak of 33 tornadoes, with one causing $40 million in damage to the Atlanta Motor Speedway.
- July 4–13 – Hurricane Dennis moved through the Caribbean and Gulf of Mexico, striking Cuba and later the Florida panhandle. On July 8, Dennis became the strongest Atlantic hurricane before the month of August. The hurricane killed 88 people and left US$4.06 billion in damage.
- July 10–20 – Typhoon Haitang hit Taiwan, killing 15 people, and it later hit Zhejiang in mainland China, killing another three people.
- July 11–21 – Hurricane Emily moved through the Caribbean, striking Grenada and two locations in Mexico – along the Yucatán Peninsula and in Tamaulipas. Emily caused 17 fatalities and about US$1 billion in damage. On July 16, Emily broke the record for the strongest Atlantic hurricane before the month of August, set by Dennis eight days earlier.
- July 18–20 – Tropical Storm Eugene brushed the southwest coast of Mexico, causing one death when a boat overturned.
- July 23–25 – Tropical Storm Gert hit the Mexican state of Tamaulipas, killing one person.
- July 29–31 – A depression moved ashore Bangladesh, with its heavy rains causing a fatality when a wall collapsed.
- July 29–August 7 – Typhoon Matsa moved ashore southern Zhejiang in mainland China, killing 25 people.

=== August ===
- August 2–11 – In South Korea, landslides from heavy rain killed 15 people.
- August 4–18 – Hurricane Irene caused a rip current death as it moved offshore the eastern United States.
- August 13–16 – A storm in Vietnam killed 13 people.
- August 17–27 – Typhoon Mawar brushed eastern Japan, causing one death.
- August 22–23 – Tropical Storm Jose hit the Mexican state of Veracruz, killing 16 people.
- August 23–30 – Hurricane Katrina became the costliest American hurricane when it struck Florida, Louisiana, and Mississippi, estimated at US$125 billion. Katrina was the deadliest Atlantic hurricane since 1928, with a death toll of 1,392 people, which was more recently surpassed by Hurricane Maria in 2017. Katrina left large portions of the New Orleans area underwater after storm surge breached the levee. The hurricane's widespread effects resulted in the greatest number of displaced people in the country since the Dust Bowl.
- August 24–September 1 – Typhoon Talim struck Taiwan, killing five. It later hit Fujian in mainland China, where the typhoon killed 167 people.
- August 29–September 8 – Typhoon Nabi moved from the Northern Marianas Islands to Japan, killing 35 people.

=== September ===
- September 1–10 – Hurricane Maria traversed the Atlantic Ocean, while its remnants impacted Europe, with a landslide in Bergen, Norway killing three people. Rip currents from Maria and nearby Hurricane Nate caused a drowning death in New Jersey.
- September 6–17 – Hurricane Ophelia meandered off the east coast of the United States, killing three people.
- September 12–17 – A depression struck Odisha and moved across India, killing six people in Madhya Pradesh from flooding.
- September 14–16 – A depression struck Gujarat, killing 13 people.
- September 16–18 – Tropical Storm Vicente killed 22 people when it struck Vietnam, including two drowning deaths in Hong Kong.
- September 17–21 – Cyclonic Storm Pyarr originated offshore Bangladesh and moved ashore eastern India, killing 91 people between the two countries.
- September 18–26 – Hurricane Rita became the strongest hurricane ever recorded in the Gulf of Mexico, before weakening and striking the U.S. Gulf coast near the border of Texas and Louisiana. There were 120 deaths, and damage was estimated at US$18.5 billion.
- September 19–28 – Typhoon Damrey moved from the Philippines, through the southern Chinese island of Hainan, and with a final landfall Vietnam, killing at least 124 people.
- September 25–October 3 – Typhoon Longwang struck eastern Taiwan, killing three people, and later mainland China in Fujian province, where the typhoon killed at least 133 people.

=== October ===
- October 1–3 – Floods in Bangladesh killed 16 people and displaced 50,000.
- October 1–5 – Hurricane Stan made hit the Mexican states of Quintana Roo and Veracruz. The storm, along with a broader weather disturbance, killed 1,669 people across Mexico and Central America, particularly in Guatemala, while damage was estimated at US$2.7 billion. El Salvador's Santa Ana Volcano erupted on October 1, occurring simultaneous to the flooding.
- October 5–14 – Tropical Storm Tammy and a subtropical depression fueled moisture to produce flooding across the northeastern United States, resulting in ten deaths and
- October 7–10 – Floods in Vietnam killed 17 people.
- October 15–26 – Hurricane Wilma moved from the Caribbean into the Gulf of Mexico and across the western Atlantic Ocean, becoming the strongest Atlantic hurricane on record on October 19. At its peak, Wilma had an estimated barometric pressure of 882 mbar (26.0 inHg), while its eye measured only 2 nautical miles (3.7 km) across, the smallest known eye in an Atlantic hurricane. Its winds reached 185 mph (298 km/h), the fourth Category 5 hurricane of the season. Along its path, Wilma killed 48 people and caused US$20.2 billion in damage.
- October 20–28 – Floods in Vietnam killed 67 people.
- October 21–29 – Monsoonal floods and a deep depression in southern India killed 127 people.
- October 22–24 – Tropical Storm Alpha struck Hispaniola, killing 26 people. Alpha was the first tropical storm to be named using the Greek Alphabet, due to the hyperactive season exhausting the regular naming list.
- October 28–November 2 – Typhoon Kai-tak struck Vietnam, killing 20 people.
- October 26–31 – Hurricane Beta struck Nicaragua after becoming the final of a record seven major hurricanes to occur during the season. Beta killed nine people.

=== November ===
- November 14–21 – Tropical Storm Gamma moved across the Caribbean, causing 39 deaths, most of them in Honduras.
- November 22–28 – Former Tropical Storm Delta struck the Canary Islands in the eastern Atlantic Ocean, leaving 19 people missing or killed, most of them from a shipwreck.
- November 28–December 2 – Cyclonic Storm Baaz originated over the eastern Bay of Bengal and later struck India, killing 11 people in Thailand and another 11 in India.

== Notes ==
Global weather by year
Preceded by 2004	Weather of 2005	Succeeded by 2006
