= Weather of 2004 =

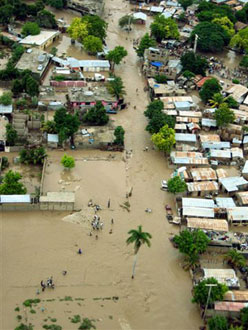
Flooding in Haiti from Hurricane Jeanne

The following is a list of weather events that occurred on Earth in the year 2004. There were several natural disasters around the world from various types of weather, including blizzards, cold waves, droughts, heat waves, tornadoes, and tropical cyclones. The deadliest disaster was Hurricane Jeanne, which killed more than 3,000 people when it struck Hispaniola, mostly in Haiti. This was just four months after flooding in Hispaniola killed 2,665 people. Jeanne was also the fourth hurricane to strike the United States in the year, following Charley, Frances, and Ivan. Ivan was the costliest natural disaster of the year, causing US$26.1 billion in damage in the Caribbean and the United States.

== Winter storms and cold waves ==
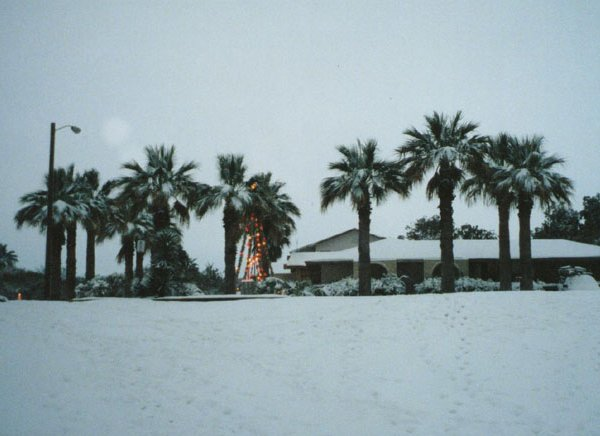
Palm trees covered in snow in Portland, Texas

In February, a snow storm dropped significant snowfall across eastern Canada.

In December, a snow storm killed 18 people and left US$800 million in damage.

Another winter storm produced snowfall in Texas and extreme northern Mexico, causing the first ever recorded White Christmas for some areas.

== Droughts, heat waves, and wildfires ==
Alaska's wildfire season was the worst on record in the state in terms of area burned. In California, there were 7,898 fires that burned 311,024 acres (1,258.67 km^{2}) of land.

In April, a high pressure system over California caused a record-setting heatwave to take place. Santa Maria recorded 100 °F (38 °C), 101 °F (38 °C) in Long Beach, and 106 °F (41 °C) in Chino. On July 20, Tokyo, Japan recorded its highest-ever temperature – 39.5 °C (103.1 °F).

== Floods ==
In May, flooding in Hispaniola killed 2,665 people.

Floods affected Japan in July, causing US$1.95 billion in damage and 20 deaths.

In February 2004, the Manawatu River flooded, displacing over 3000 people and damaging approximately 1000 local farms

It costed ~122 million NZD in insurance payouts.

== Tornadoes ==
During the year, there was a record-high total of 1,817 tornadoes in the United States alone, collectively resulting in 35 deaths. This included an outbreak related to Hurricane Ivan, which resulted in 120 tornadoes, the most ever related to a tropical cyclone.

In addition to the United States tornadoes, a powerful tornado struck portions of North-Central Bangladesh in April, killing 111 and injuring nearly 1,500 others. Seven people were killed and 207 injured by a tornado that appeared on the evening of April 21 in Hengyang, Hunan, China.

== Tropical cyclones ==
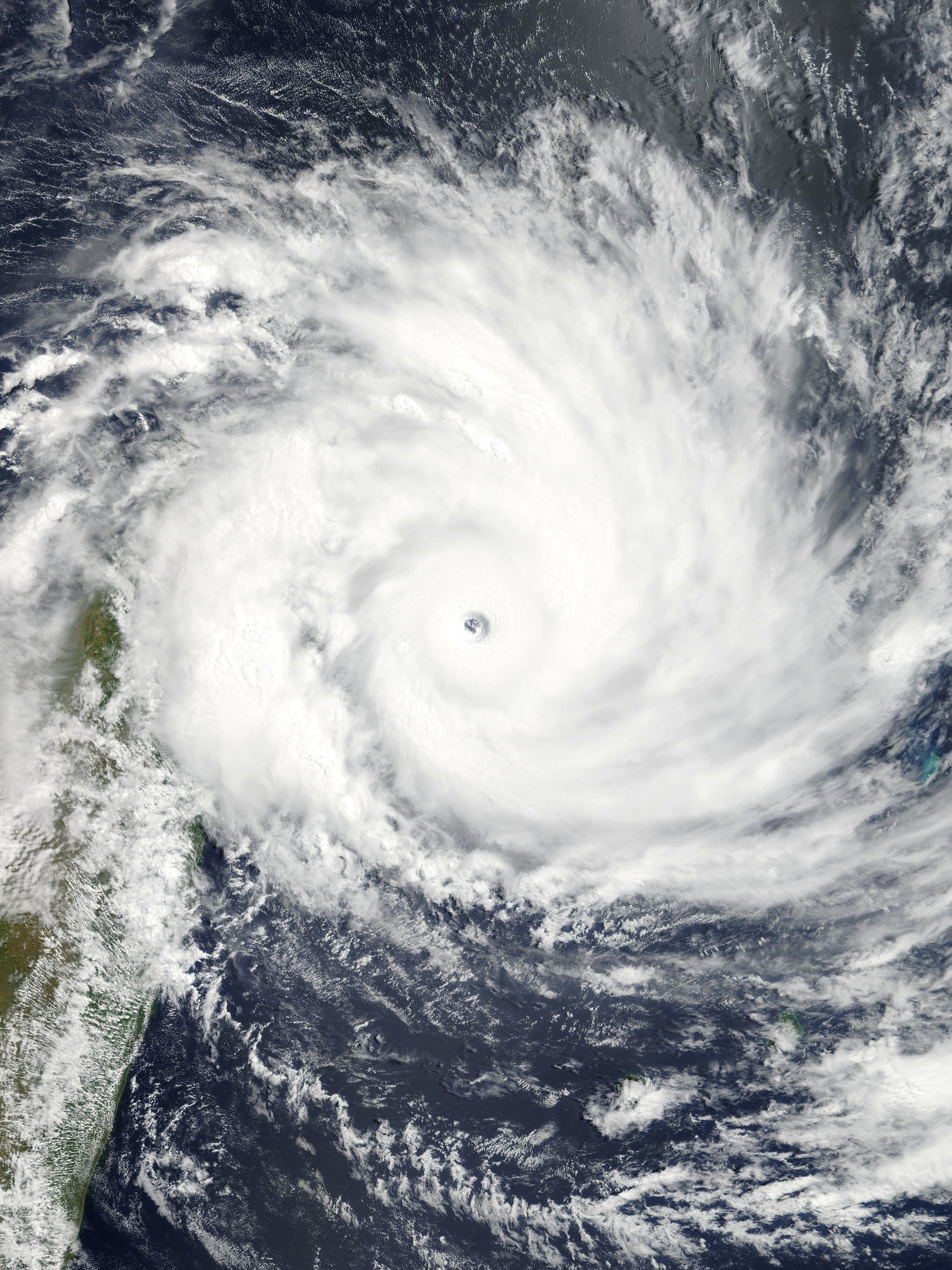
Satellite image of Cyclone Gafilo, one of the strongest and deadliest cyclones to strike Madagascar

As the year began, Cyclone Heta was developing near Fiji, and a few days later, it devastated the South Pacific nation of Niue, resulting in damage equivalent to 25% of its gross domestic product (GDP). Also as the year began, Tropical Storm Darius was approaching Mauritius in the south-west Indian Ocean. Throughout 2004, a further 18 tropical cyclones developed in the south-west Indian Ocean, which included Cyclone Gafilo, the most intense tropical cyclone on record in that part of the world. In March, Gafilo struck Madagascar near peak intensity, killing 363 people. A month prior to Gafilo, Cyclone Elita moved across the same country for the third time, dropping heavy rainfall that led to 33 deaths. In the Australian region, there were 14 tropical cyclones throughout the year, including Tropical Cyclone Raymond which lasted into early January 2005. The South Pacific Ocean had 15 tropical cyclones after Heta, most of them weak.

In addition to the previous tropical cyclones in the Southern Hemisphere, there was an unusual South Atlantic tropical cyclone named Cyclone Catarina, which became the first-ever recorded hurricane off the coast of Brazil. The body of water was previously thought to be hostile to the formation of tropical cyclones. Catarina caused about US$425 million in damage and 12 fatalities.

In the Northern Hemisphere, a record ten typhoons struck Japan, part of the active typhoon season, collectively causing 214 fatalities. Among the typhoons was Typhoon Songda, which left an estimated US$12.5 billion in damage. There was a series of tropical cyclones affecting the Philippines in a two-week period from November to early December, resulting in 1,762 deaths. In the north-east Pacific Ocean, there were 17 tropical cyclones, most of which remained away from land. In the North Indian Ocean, there were nine tropical cyclones, with the practice of naming storms beginning in October. The season included a deadly cyclone in Myanmar that killed 236 people, and a depression that killed 273 people in India.

In the north Atlantic Ocean, there were 16 tropical cyclones, most of which affected land in the Caribbean or the United States. Four hurricanes – Charley, Frances, Ivan, and Jeanne – affected Florida in a six-week period, the most to affect the state in a year. Charley left US$16.9 billion in damage when it hit Cuba and Florida. Damage from Frances was estimated at US$9.8 billion. Ivan was the season's strongest, killing 92 people and causing US$26.1 billion in damage in the Caribbean and the United States. Jeanne struck Hispaniola, causing 3,029 deaths on the island, mostly in Haiti, and later caused US$7.5 billion in damage in the United States.

Global weather by year
Preceded by 2003	Weather of 2004	Succeeded by 2005
