= Weather of 2006 =

Major worldwide weather events in calendar year 2006

Global weather activity of 2006 profiles the major worldwide weather events, including blizzards, ice storms, tropical cyclones, tornadoes, and other weather events, from January 1, 2006, to December 31, 2006. Winter storms are events in which the dominant varieties of precipitation are forms that only occur at cold temperatures, such as snow or sleet, or a rainstorm where ground temperatures are cold enough to allow ice to form (i.e. freezing rain). It may be marked by strong wind, thunder and lightning (a thunderstorm), heavy precipitation, such as ice (ice storm), or wind transporting some substance through the atmosphere (as in a dust storm, snowstorm, hailstorm, etc.). Other major non winter events such as large dust storms, Hurricanes, cyclones, tornadoes, gales, flooding and rainstorms are also caused by such phenomena to a lesser or greater existent.

Very rarely, well-defined winter storms may form during the summer, though it would usually have to be an abnormally cold summer, such as the Summer of 1816 in the Northeastern United States. In many locations in the Northern Hemisphere, the most powerful winter storms usually occur in March and, in regions where temperatures are cold enough, April.

== The events of 2006 ==
=== January ===
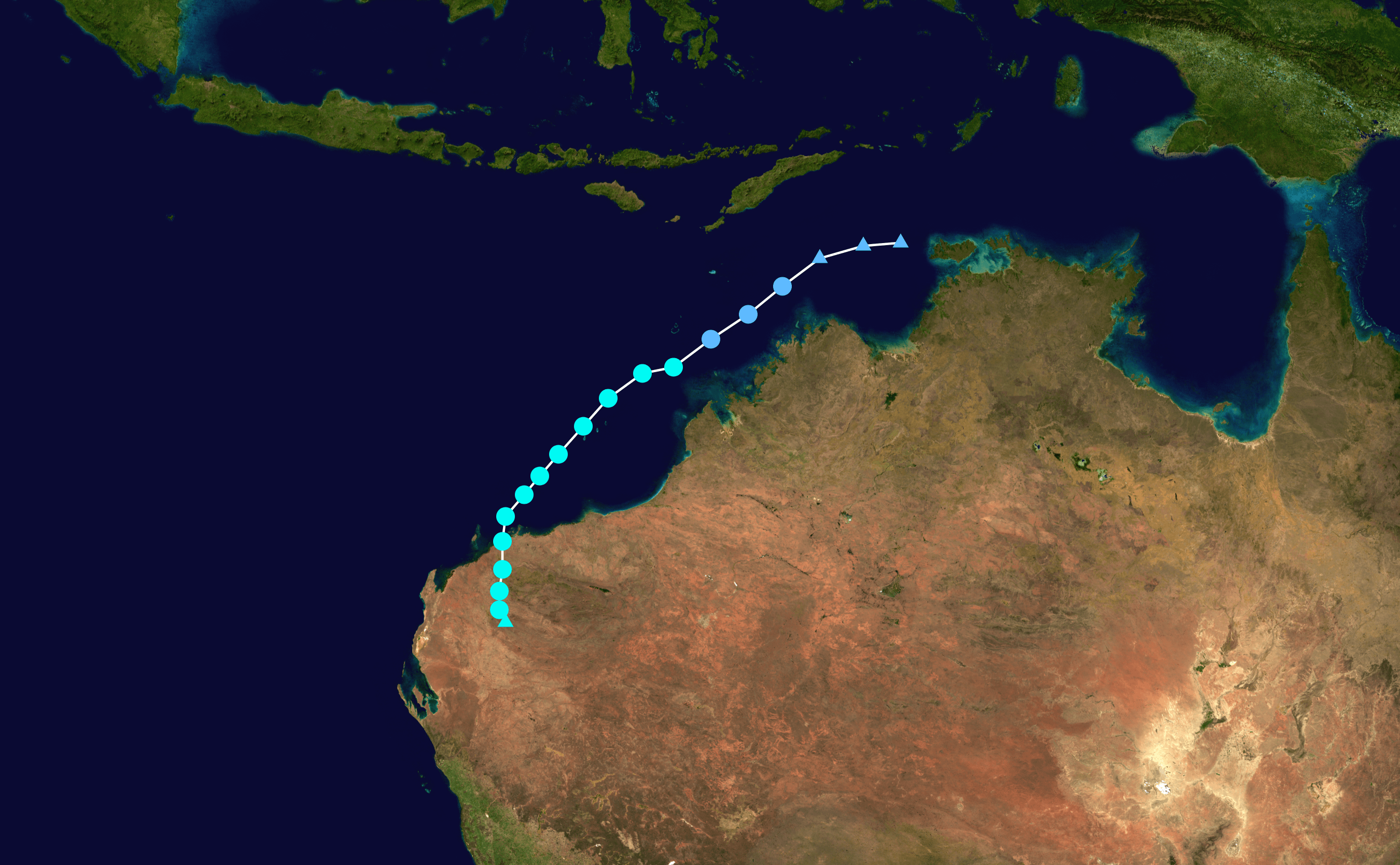
Clare’s Path.

Severe Tropical Cyclone Clare was a moderate strength cyclone which hit Western Australia in January 2006. The storm formed as an area of low pressure in the Arafura Sea, on 4 January 2006, and moved westward. It ultimately peaked at Category 3 intensity on the Australian tropical cyclone scale. It moved ashore on the coast of Pilbara and proceeded inland, dissipating on 10 January. Clare produced winds of 142 km/h (88 mph) at Karratha and triggered widespread torrential rainfall that led to flooding. Following its usage, the name Clare was retired by the Bureau of Meteorology, and will never be used again for a tropical cyclone in the area affected by it. Ahead of the storm's landfall, local and state officials issued a "red alert" for several locations along the storm's predicted path. 2,000 people were evacuated in the Karratha region. In areas between Broome and Port Hedland, people were urged to tidy up debris and organise disaster supplies to prepare for the storm. Several ports were closed and some oil rigs were shut down at the time with heavy floods in the affected region and parts of East Timor.

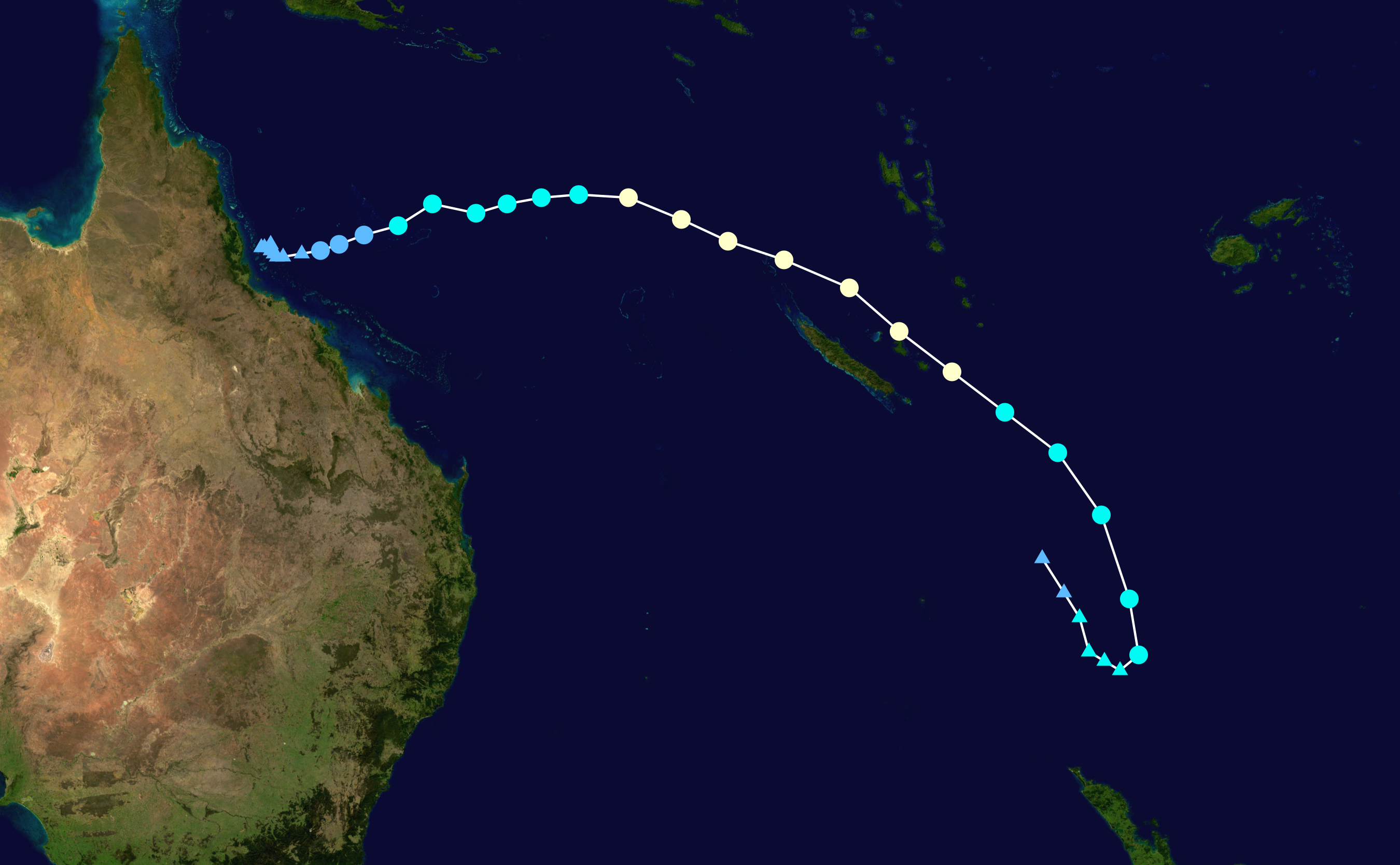
Cyclone Jim’s track.

On 24 January, a broad area of low pressure developed near the coast of Queensland after a monsoonal trough passed through the region. Northeasterly winds flowing into the system quickly increased convection, resulting in heavy rainfall over coastal regions of Queensland. The slow movement of the developing low continued through 26 January before turning northeast in response to a mid-level ridge to the north. On 28 January, the JTWC began monitoring the system as Tropical Storm 10P and shortly after, the Bureau of Meteorology classified the storm as a Category 1 cyclone and gave it the name Jim. Torrential rainfall affected portions of coastal Queensland between 26 and 27 January. In a 24-hour span, 258 mm (10.2 in) of rain fell in Home Hill, leading to minor flooding. On 28 January, the cyclone brushed Flinders Reef, New Caledonia, Willis Island and Lihou Reef, bringing winds up to 65 kilometres per hour (40 mph) to all three areas.

=== February ===
The TCWC Brisbane issued a gale warning for a Tropical Low near the northern tip of Cape York Peninsula on February 22. The low moved in an easterly direction. It quickly strengthened and became Tropical Cyclone Kate on the same day. Kate moved eastwards and weakened into a tropical low on February 24. Coastal Queensland was badly hit. In the Shire of Noosa, six surfers sustained serious injuries after wading into turbulent waters. Waves up to 1.8 m (6 ft) tossed the six surfers, leaving them with injuries ranging from broken noses and fractured ankles to head wounds from surfboards.

=== June ===
On June 10 start the Storm of the Biobio in Chile, to August 23, with heavy rainfall in the regions of Coquimbo, Valparaíso, Metropolitan of Santiago, O'Higgins, Maule, Biobío, Araucanía, Los Ríos, Los Lagos and Aysén. Of the magnitude 12 in the Beaufort scale. It was rated as the worst time of the last 30 years in Chile.

=== July ===
Heavy sandstorms sweep Mauritania's Sahel on July 12 and 17.

=== August ===
==== August 7 ====
50 houses were damaged with 7 houses completely losing roofs and two people received minor injuries in the suburb of Leschenault in Australind, Western Australia which is located 163 kilometres (101 mi) south of Perth. Western Australian Bureau of Meteorology measured the tornado to be a F2 on the Fujita scale with the damage area measuring around 100m by 2000m.

==== August 13–29 ====
Between 13 and 29 August, major storm-induced flood hit the Cambodia. On the 13th the Battambang, Pursat and Kampong Thom were the first to be hit. The heavy rainfall started at evening time of 13 August in Kampong Speu Province and ended on the 14th. Kampot was flooded by heavy rain on the 16th along with five affected districts, 92 communes, 482 villages until the 17th. The Cambodian Red Cross Society gave help to the storm's victims. The storm burnt itself out over Thailand and Laos on the 29th. The Stung Sen River and Mekong river burst their banks.

The major storm-induced flood hit the Cambodian provinces of Kandal, Koh Kong, Kampot, Kampong Speu, Kampong Thom, Battambang, Pursat, Rattanakiri and the municipality of Phnom Penh particularly badly, as were the Thai provinces Amphoe Chiang Saen and Chiang Rai Province. Cambodian officials reported five deaths (two in Kampong Speu and 3 in Kampot). It was said that 252 homes had been flooded, 12 homes had been washed away and about 6,000 families had been evacuated from low-lying and coastal regions that were prone to flooding of this type. The Laotian town of Chiang Saen, Sekong Province and Attapeu Province and Vientiane Prefecture were briefly flooded in places the 29th and 30th.

==== August 21 ====
An isolated, strong tornado was reported in Remagen in Germany on the evening of August 21. Significant damage was reported in the area as it hit a campground. One person was killed and several others were injured as a result. It was the fourth tornado fatality in Europe in 2006.

=== September ===
==== September 14–16 ====
While not a major event, the first widespread winter weather event took place in the higher elevations of the Northwestern United States and as far south as Utah, and especially across the higher elevations of western Canada. The snow did not affect any of the major cities in the area, but did affect travel. The snow also had a positive impact in that it significantly reduced the number of wildfires in the area.

Such heavy snowfall is not unusual in September, especially in the northern Rocky Mountains.

==== September 21–23 ====
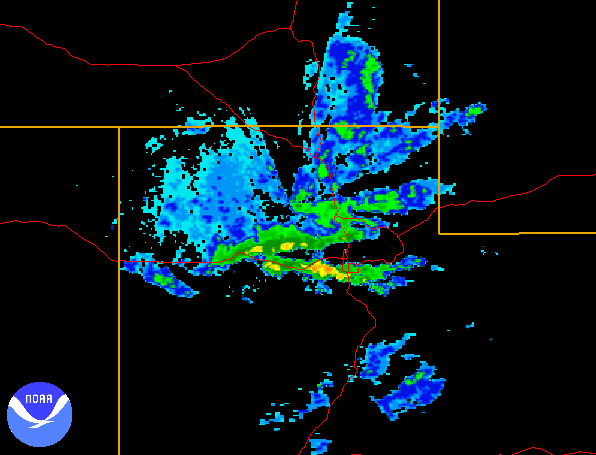
The snow system seen over Utah.

Another storm moved into the Rocky Mountain region, dropping 1–2 feet (0.3–0.6 m) of snow throughout the mountains of Utah, Wyoming, and Colorado. The Black Hills near Deadwood, South Dakota also saw up to a foot of snow. Gothic, Colorado and Alta, Utah both reported 11 inches (280 mm).

=== October ===
==== October 9 ====
On the 8th and 9th, 32 died as an unusually heavy rain storm hits Thailand. 43 provinces are flooded, with Chiang Mai Province being the worst off. 1,000 were injured and approximately another 138,000 had been made ill by the polluted water supplies left after the storm had destroyed most of the water channels, sewerage systems and water pipe lines. The Thai government estimate that 648,000 acres (2,620 km^{2}) of rice fields and farmland have been destroyed.

==== October 11–13 ====
Weather radar imagery of the lake-effect precipitation, seen trailing from the Great Lakes.

A low pressure system moving through the Great Lakes region, accompanied by a record-breaking cold snap, combined to produce significant early-season snowfall across the region. Several areas on the Lower Peninsula of Michigan recorded their earliest-ever measurable snowfall, including 0.2" at Detroit on October 12, beating the old record from October 13, 1909, and 1–2 feet (0.3–0.6 m) of snow fell over western portions of the Upper Peninsula. A foot of snow also fell across portions of southwestern Ontario in the Niagara region with significant amounts also recorded in northwestern Ontario north and west of Thunder Bay.

Record-breaking snowfall of 1–2 feet (0.3–0.6 m) also occurred in the highly localized lake effect snowband areas around Buffalo, New York, with Buffalo setting two consecutive daily October snowfall records, recording a total of 22.6 inches (570 mm). The resulting heavy, wet snow downed tree limbs and power lines, leaving 350,000 people without electricity in western New York. It also closed a large section of Interstate 90 from Rochester to Dunkirk and killed three people. Governor George Pataki declared a state of emergency in the hard-hit counties. The bands were very localized; very little snow fell in most other areas.

==== October 25–30 ====
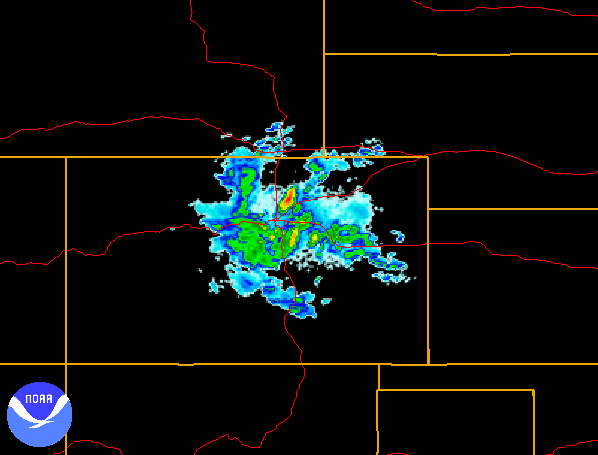
The snow system seen over Colorado.

The first Plains blizzard of the season occurred over the Front Range of Colorado. Blizzard warnings were issued, with 6–12 inches (15–30 cm) of snow combining with winds as strong as 60 miles per hour (97 km/h) in some areas. Snow accumulations in the mountains reached up to 2 feet (0.6 m). Dozens of school districts were closed and highways were blocked throughout the region. Most flights out of Denver International Airport were either canceled or significantly delayed.

Significant amounts of snow were also reported across northeastern Ontario and western and central Quebec from October 26 to October 30. Accumulations exceeded locally 20 centimetres (8 inches).

=== November ===
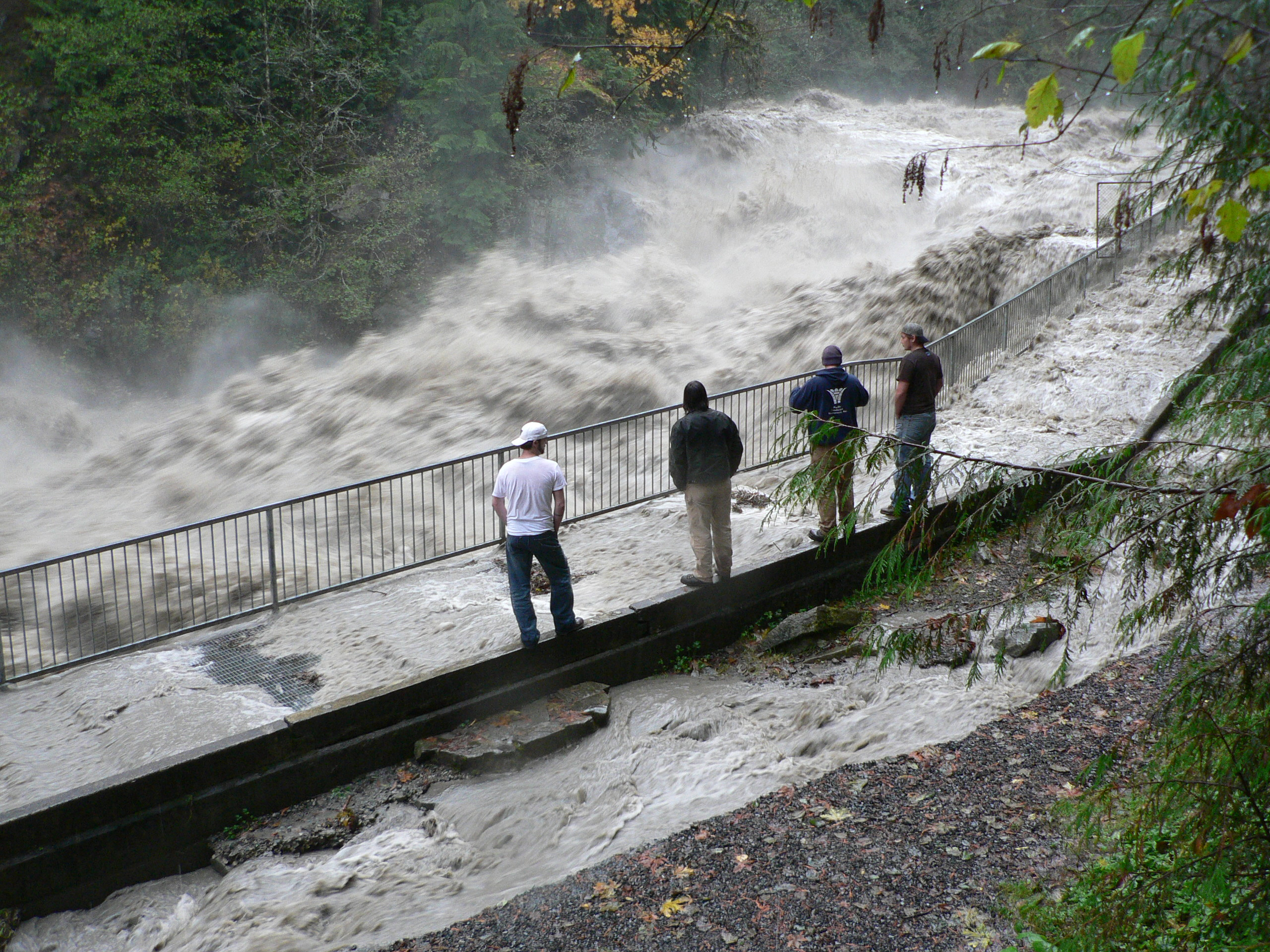
Stillaguamish River flood

==== November 5–7 ====
The Puget Sound area received a Pineapple Express that dumped several inches of rain over the area in a period of four days caused massive flooding, two deaths, and extensive damage to Mount Rainier National Park. The rain contributed significantly towards making November 2006 the wettest on record for Seattle.

==== November 9–11 ====
The first major winter storm of the season in the Upper Midwest dumped heavy snow across parts of Minnesota, Wisconsin and the Upper Peninsula of Michigan. The highest amounts were in western Wisconsin, east of the Twin Cities, where up to 16 inches (41 cm) of snow fell. Schools and roads were closed as a result. Portions of Northeastern Ontario, including Greater Sudbury, also received over 15 centimetres on the night of the tenth into the 11th, with moderate snow falling across central Quebec later that day.

==== November 20–24 ====
A nor'easter impacted parts of South Carolina and Georgia in areas that typically don't receive snow, especially in November. The storm produced thunder snow for a time at Charleston, South Carolina, the only time thunder snow has been reported. Generally 1–2 inches was observed in interior areas from Jenkins County, Georgia to Colleton County, South Carolina. Not only was this a winter weather oddity, it was record setting. Charleston and Savannah, Georgia both observed their earliest snowfall on record. The powerful storm also brought heavy rains, severe beach erosion, and damaging winds to South Carolina and Georgia. This storm also brought snow flurries as far south as central Florida, near Orlando, the earliest that snow had ever been recorded that far south.

==== November 26–December 1 ====
A widespread and severe storm complex tracked across the entire northern and central parts of North America in the last week of November. It produced a variety of severe weather, including heavy snow, rain, freezing rain, sleet, high winds, extreme cold, a serial derecho and several tornadoes.

The most severe impacts were in the Midwest where several fatalities were reported and extensive power outages occurred.

=== December ===
==== December 8 ====
A severe, but localized, lake effect snow event took place in parts of the Great Lakes region. The hardest hit community was London, Ontario, where over 50 cm (20 inches) of snow fell. The heavy snow virtually shut down the community, with many roads and highways closed and even shutting down the transit system for the first time since 1978. Other areas on the leeward side of the Great Lakes saw lesser snowfall amounts.

==== December 14–16 ====
While a severe rain and wind event took place in the Pacific Northwest causing significant damage and power outages, the highland areas saw blizzard conditions, along with hurricane-force winds. Some areas received over 16 inches (40 cm) of snow along with winds in excess of 80 mph (130 km/h). The blizzard also stalled rescue efforts on Mount Hood.

==== December 18–21 ====
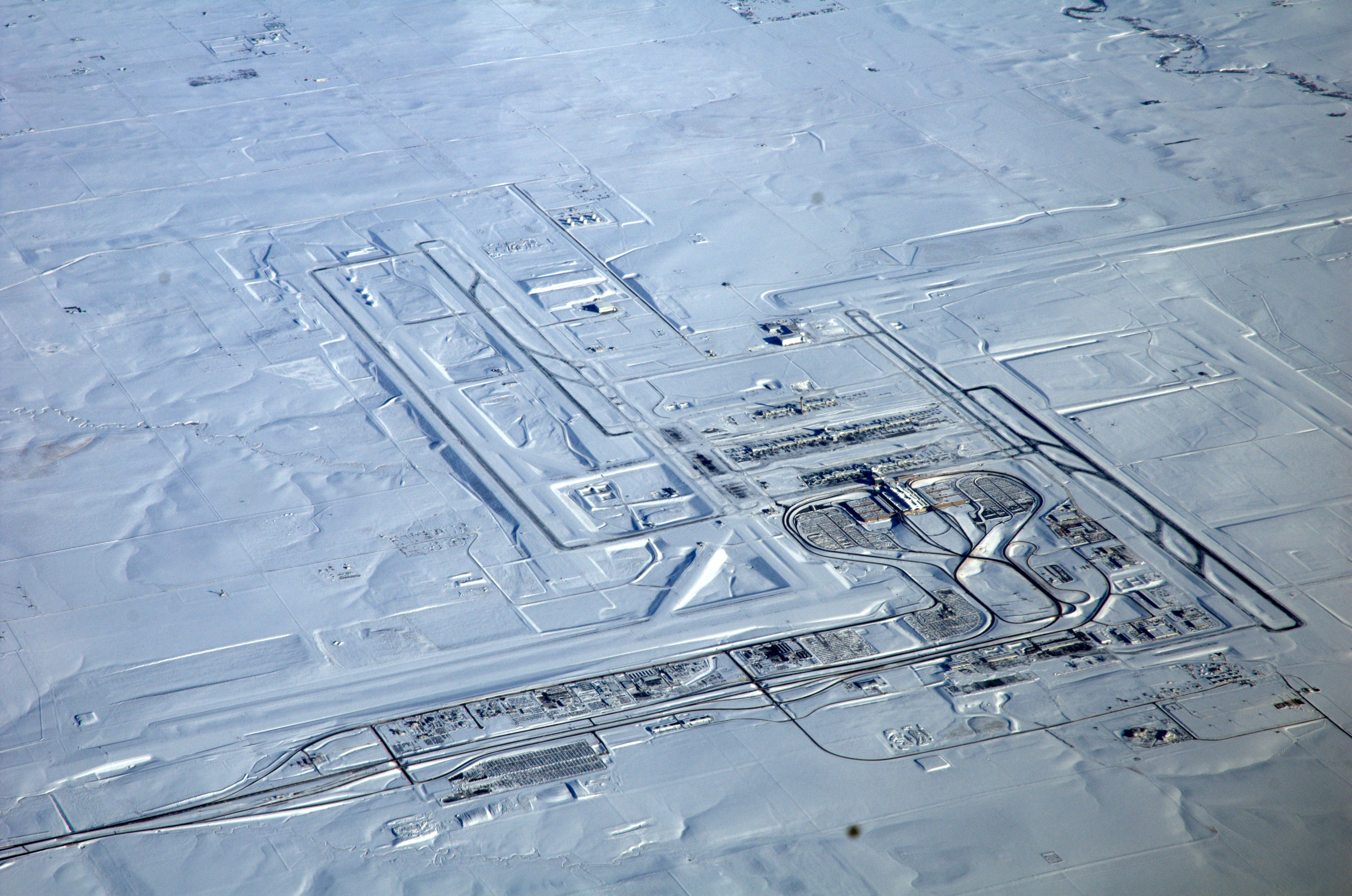
Denver International Airport Dec 22 2006

Another major winter storm slammed into the High Plains and central Rocky Mountains on December 19 and continued through December 21. The storm produced heavy snow across a large area covering six states centered around Denver, Colorado. Areas in the foothills received up to 27 inches (68 cm) of snow, which closed many highways, including several Interstates. The area was crippled as a result, with schools and most businesses closed and the local transit system shut down. The heavy snow also closed Denver International Airport as the Christmas rush began.

Some areas expected up to 3 feet (90 cm) of snow. In addition, up to 7 inches (18 cm) fell as far south as New Mexico.

Governor Bill Owens declared a state of emergency, which allowed state funds to be used to activate the Colorado National Guard. Four people were killed by the storm.

==== December 26–27 ====
A rare winter storm blanketed parts of the Middle East including southern Jordan which the area was paralysed due to heavy snow. Numerous roads leading to the area's main cities were shut down. The country's civil and defense teams had to rescue more than 1,400 who were trapped across various areas of the country. Air Force helicopters also assisted in the rescue efforts. No fatalities were reported.

==== December 28, 2006 – January 1, 2007 ====
Another massive blizzard hit the Front Range of Colorado and adjacent Plains areas. Approximately 1–2 feet of snow fell along the Front Range, cancelling many flights and closing some roads, while up to 4 feet (1.2 m) fell in the surrounding foothills and mountains. At least a foot of snow, combined in some areas with up to 3 inches (76 mm) of freezing rain, fell from the Texas Panhandle north along the High Plains into South Dakota. Ice fell all the way north into Ontario, and from December 31 into January 1, ice fell in northern New England before the storm weakened and exited the coast. The area around Albuquerque, New Mexico saw 1–3 feet of snow, including a record one day snowfall of 11.3 inches (290 mm) on December 29. One area in the mountains of New Mexico saw an incredible 58 inches (4 feet, 10 inches). The storm overall brought 16.5 inches to Albuquerque, helping the city achieve its second-highest monthly snowfall total on record. Western Kansas saw up to 32 inches (810 mm) of snow, and a huge sweep of the central Plains for stranded travelers was undertaken in the days after the storm. 12 people were killed in the storm; 10 in traffic accidents across Colorado, Texas, and Minnesota, 1 from a tornado in Texas, where severe thunderstorms occurred, and 1 from carbon monoxide poisoning from a generator in western Kansas.

== See also ==
- Tropical cyclones in 2006

Global weather by year
Preceded by 2005	Weather of 2006	Succeeded by 2007
