= May 2004 Caribbean floods =

Flood event that took place in the Caribbean Islands

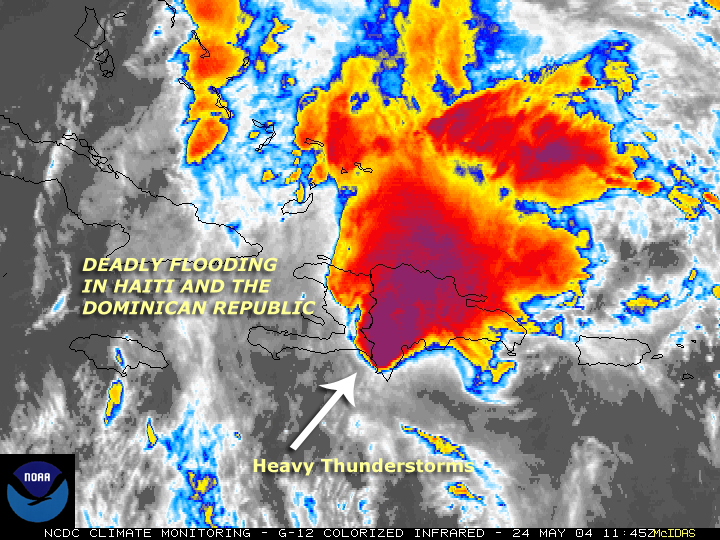
- Satellite image of convection affecting Hispaniola
- Date: May 18 – 25, 2004
- Location: Greater Antilles, mostly Hispaniola
- Deaths: About 2,000

The May 2004 Caribbean floods were a flood event that affected the Caribbean Islands and Hispaniola from May 18, 2004, to May 25, 2004. Moving quickly from Central America, a low-pressure area brought heavy rainfall and thunderstorms to Cuba, Jamaica, Haiti, and the Dominican Republic resulting in rainfall amounts exceeding 500 mm (19.7 inches) within a 7-day period. Cities in flood-plain areas like Mapou, Haiti, and Jimani, of the Dominican Republic, experienced over 250 mm (10 inches) of rain between May 24 and 25, causing the Solie River to overflow, resulting in devastating environmental and infrastructure damage. With hundreds dead and thousands more displaced in Mapou and Jimani, the death toll was at its highest in decades, partly because of deforestation. Steep valley ridges and barren hillsides channeled rainwater towards valleys, creating landslides that overwhelmed and flooded cities particularly in high-poverty areas where buildings were wooden or makeshift temporary homes. In addition, inhabitants residing on these flood plains were subject to increased risk from water-borne diseases due to inadequate waste removal management and contaminated water supply due to excessive debris caused by flooding.

These floods were preceded by two weeks of persistent rain in the Caribbean area, which eventually caused the landslides that killed many people. The floods caused much damage in Haiti and the Dominican Republic, with over 1,300 homes being destroyed and about 2,000 people being killed. Due to this destruction, nearly 15,000 people were displaced with nowhere to live. The area that felt the worst of the flooding was the town of Jimaní, near the border of Haiti and the Dominican Republic. In fact, the destruction present at Jimaní was so bad that Dominican president Hipolito Mejia declared a national day of mourning after seeing the effects of the storm.

== Background ==
Due to its geographic location, Haiti is especially vulnerable to storm surges and hydrometeorological disasters. Nestled in the Atlantic Basin, Haiti's mountainous topography and weakened natural barriers exacerbate the effects of storms. Deforestation, construction, and mismanaged land use have led to a deterioration in natural barriers such as mangroves, coral reefs, wetlands, and sand dunes, further debilitating Haiti's ability to withstand intense storms and to provide emergency services. The damage to Haiti's already weak infrastructure and lack of natural barriers intensive efforts to secure food, water, and humanitarian relief required.

== Meteorological history ==
A broad low pressure area developed over Central America on May 19, accompanied by heavy rainfall. The system drifted eastward into the Caribbean Sea, and by May 23 was located in the central Caribbean, producing rainfall across Jamaica, eastern Cuba, Haiti, the Dominican Republic, and Puerto Rico. Upper-level winds prevented tropical cyclogenesis of the system. However, the low had characteristics of a subtropical cyclone, with a closed atmospheric circulation and extensive convection extending to the northeast of the system. The interaction between the low and a high pressure area over the southwestern Atlantic Ocean produced winds of around 25 mph (40 km/h) across the region.

The system moved slowly across the Greater Antilles. By early on May 24, the low was located south of Haiti and was interacting with a tropical wave. Later that day, the system moved over southwestern Haiti, crossing into the Bahamas by May 25. Later that day, the National Hurricane Center briefly noted the possibility of the system developing into a tropical cyclone, noting its well-defined circulation. Although there was a lack of convection near the center, there was a potential for the shear to diminish. However, by late on May 26, the system no longer had a chance for development after it began moving quickly to the northeast. By May 27, the system was located about 190 mi (305 km) east of Bermuda, connected to a trough that extended to Hispaniola.

== Geographical and physical impacts ==
=== Haiti ===
Widespread flooding and rising rivers had serious consequences in several parts of the country, including the capital of Haiti, Port-au-Prince, and the town of Fond Verrettes. The road linking the two areas was unusable, so air transport was the only option. Fond Verrettes was almost completely washed away, and a mudslide swept away more than 500 houses in the town.

In addition, the town of Mapou, located 50 km southeast of the capital, was cut off by flooding. The water reached a depth of more than 3 metres. Consequently, 1,300 houses, almost half of Mapou's houses, were severely damaged. In the area surrounding Mapou, more than 35 villages were affected.

Approximately 5,000 families were displaced throughout the country.

=== Dominican Republic ===
Floods occurred in the south, northwest, and northeast areas of the country. Telephone communications and electricity were affected, as was the supply of drinking water due to damage to 21 aqueducts in the country. The most damaged area was the community of Jimani, in the west of the country. More than 300 houses were demolished there. Patients at the hospital of Jimani had to be evacuated because the facilities were severely flooded.

Moreover, other provinces such as Barahona, Bahoruco, Elías Piña and Duarte also suffered the consequences of the floods. Duarte's rice crops represented 70% of all rice crops in the Dominican Republic. Due to the flood, thousands of hectares of rice crops in this area, as well as banana crops were destroyed. Also in this northeastern province of Duarte, around 100 families had to be relocated to temporary shelters.

Across the Dominican Republic, 3,112 houses were affected in some way by the floods. Around 3,000 families were displaced. Given the extent of the damage, the Dominican Republic National Emergency Commission declared a yellow alert in the country.

== Response ==
=== Local response ===
Authorities of the Dominican Republic buried more than 250 bodies immediately and sprayed disinfectant from aircraft over Jimani to prevent the spread of disease from decomposing bodies. They also sent the army to search for victims by using dogs and shovels. In addition, the Caribbean Disaster Emergency Response Agency (CDERA) Coordinating Unit promptly contacted with multi-lateral and bi-lateral counterparts in Haiti and the Dominican Republic to ascertain needs, monitor the situation as it evolved and provide SitReps (Situation Reports) and needs information. Social Service of Dominican Churches (SSID) began an initial assessment of difficulty in accessing water-logged regions. It also assessed damages and losses in the communities where it worked, and prepared a multi-year food security proposal targeting families whose food security situation was severely affected by the disaster. Lutheran World Federation (LWF) and Service Chrétien d'Haiti (SCH) applied to Church World Service (CWS) for the reallocation of food shipment to flood survivors that had originally been intended for use in response to Haiti's recent social and political unrest.

=== International response ===
The international community led by the United Nations (UN) responded very quickly to the emergency in Haiti and the Dominican Republic. The UN dispatched a United Nations Disaster Assessment and Coordination Team (UNDAC) to coordinate donor response activity in the affected countries.

Many other countries and regions also provided emergency assistance:

- The United States led military force ferried emergency aid to a hard-hit Haitian town;
- The British Virgin Islands pledged US$20,000;
- Belize pledged one container of relief supplies for each of the affected countries and BZ$25,000 through the Red Cross;
- Jamaica donated medical supplies and equipment that were sent by boat;
- Ireland pledged up to €100,000 in emergency humanitarian assistance in response to flooding and storms in both countries;
- The European Union sent an emergency package worth about €2 million ($2.43 m).

== Immediate mortality and morbidity implications ==
=== Immediate mortality ===
On May 26, 2004, the official death toll in both countries totalled 870. By May 29, 2004, the number of deaths had skyrocketed. In Haiti death tolls were at 1,800: 1,000 (Mapou), 548 (Bodarie, Thiotte, Grand Gosier), 250 (Fonds-Verettes), 2 (Port-a-Piment). On the Dominican side, death tolls were at 415: 393 (Jimaní) and 22 (Elia Piña, Duarte, Sanchez).

=== Morbidity implications ===
Changes in the ecosystems led to an increase in vector (mosquito) population. Both countries reported Malaria outbreaks with 13,157 cases reported in 2004 compared to 1,529 cases reported in 2003. There was also a low incidence of classic dengue with 2,340 cases reported in total.

Damage to the water and sanitation infrastructure also led to water-borne disease outbreaks. Prior to the floods, Rotavirus disease was a major health issue in both countries - accounting for 42% of all diarrheal deaths. In 2004, both countries reported a sharp increase in rotavirus infections. A total of 275 deaths were reported in Independencia Province. There were no leptospirosis and cholera cases reported in both countries^{.} However, the damaging effects of this and subsequent disasters continuously weakened the water and sanitation infrastructure which eventually led to a major cholera outbreak in 2010.

Prior to the floods, both countries had the highest Human Immunodeficiency virus (HIV) and Tuberculosis (TB) prevalence rate outside of sub-Saharan Africa. The floods had exacerbated the HIV and TB epidemic in both countries. Although the prevalence of new cases seemed low, a disruption in access to multi-level biomedical interventions led to an increase in mortality rates. HIV death rates in the Dominican Republic alone reached 80.5 deaths per 100,000 people in 2004. The floods also disrupted immunisation programs for vaccine-preventable diseases. Poor immunisation coverage for diphtheria led to an outbreak in 2004 in the Dominican Republic and a resurgence in Haiti since December 2014.

== Short and long term consequences ==
The health impact of disasters such as the 2004 Caribbean floods are complex and cascading. In the short and long terms, floods can affect human health both directly and indirectly. Short-term direct impacts mainly include leptospirosis and acute respiratory infections (ARI). Short-term indirect impacts are a result of two main modes of transmission being water-borne: diarrhoea, cholera, typhoid, hepatitis A, and vector-borne: diseases from intermediate species that carry disease pathogens, such as mosquitoes. Vector-borne diseases brought on by flooding include dengue fever and malaria. In addition, displacement and eventual overcrowding can lead to fungal infections of the lungs and skin.

The long-term health impacts of the Caribbean floods are mainly in the form of mental health problems. The experience of surviving a flood disaster can affect people for years. Anxiety, depression, post-traumatic stress disorder (PTSD), confusion and insomnia are some of the common mental health problems that occur after a flood disaster.

In addition, not only the health of communities that have experienced flooding is at risk. Disaster relief workers, healthcare workers and key service providers may also be affected. As the flooding occurred in 2004, there is a lack of data in this area, so this direction will not be discussed. In the longer term, chronic illness, disability, poor mental health and poverty-related illnesses, including malnutrition, are potential legacies of the floods.

== Lessons learned ==
Vulnerabilities already exist in the Caribbean countries and other small island developing States. Accelerated global warming will only exacerbate them. Small island developing States must be actively involved in adaptation and mitigation measures to address long-term climate change. During this period, targeted investments in high-priority vulnerabilities can lead to no-regret outcomes of high environmental and economic benefits.

Structural and non-structural measures

This is mainly due to the steady increase in population and economic activity in flood-prone areas. The consequences of flooding in the Caribbean are severe because of the exponential increase in urbanization of floodplains, unregulated, human-induced degradation of watersheds, lack of emergency preparedness and resilience, persistent poverty, inefficient public policies and infrastructure problems. The scientific community can work to use advanced methods and techniques to reveal and understand the dynamics and trends of flooding. This will help scientists, politicians and water managers or authorities to develop appropriate policies and measures to prevent and mitigate the effects of flooding. To assess flood risk and prepare mitigation and adaptation measures, structural measures such as policy and economic functions (from low- to high-income countries) need to be compared with non-structural measures and forward-looking consideration of future climatic conditions. The following measures should be considered: (1) strengthening the use of machine learning methods and new satellite imagery products to improve flood prediction and flood warning systems; (2) identifying the role of vegetation in flood occurrence; and (3) establishing adequate, cost-effective structural and non-structural flood prevention policies and measures.

== See also ==
- Economy of Haiti
- 1985 Puerto Rico floods
