= 2005 North Indian Ocean cyclone season =

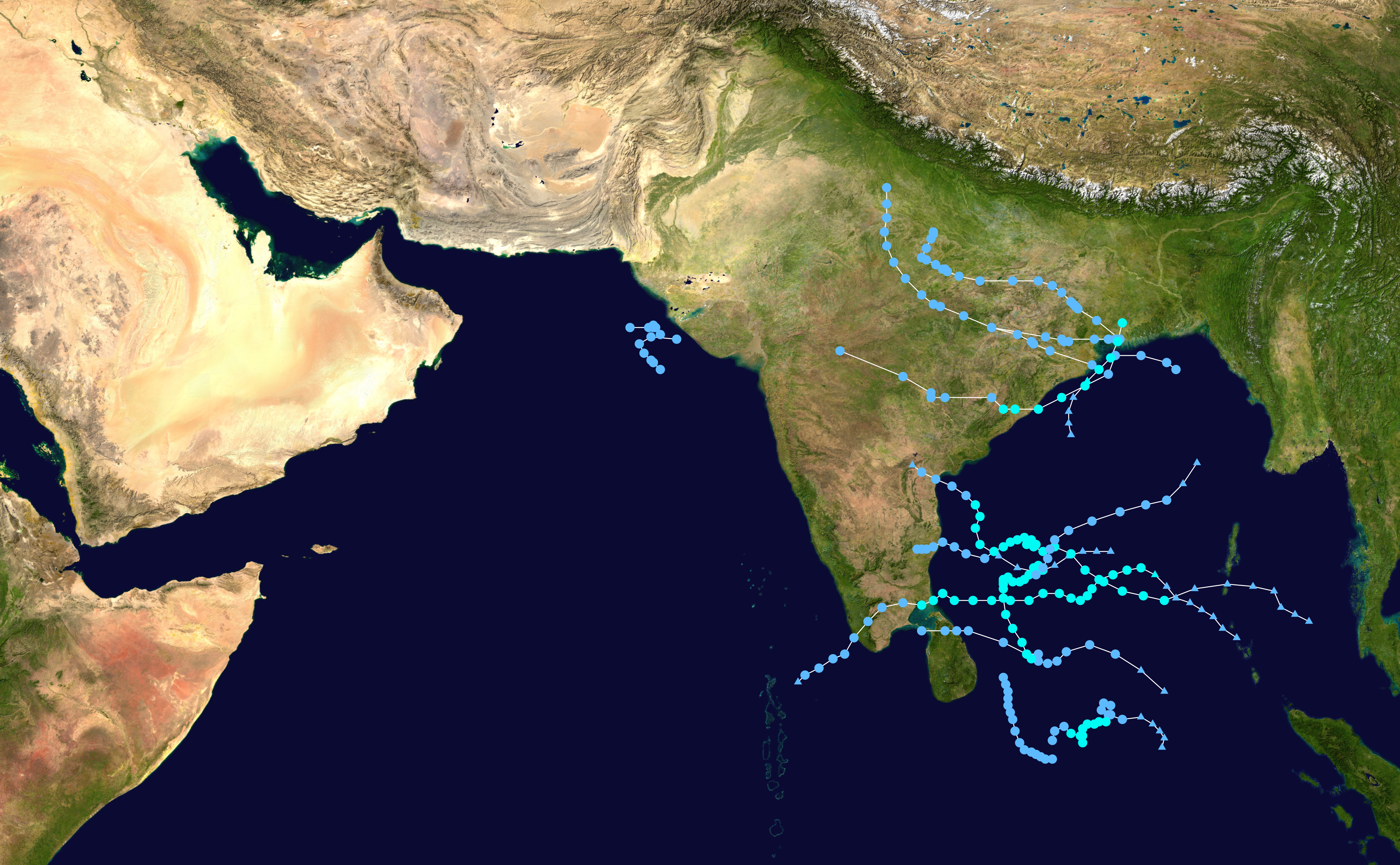
- Season summary map

Seasonal boundaries
- First system formed: January 7, 2005
- Last system dissipated: December 22, 2005

Strongest storm
- By maximum sustained winds: Baaz and Fanoos
  - Maximum winds: 85 km/h (50 mph) (3-minute sustained)
  - Lowest pressure: 998 hPa (mbar)
- By central pressure: Pyarr
  - Maximum winds: 65 km/h (40 mph) (3-minute sustained)
  - Lowest pressure: 988 hPa (mbar)

Seasonal statistics
- Depressions: 12, 2 unofficial
- Deep depressions: 7, 1 unofficial
- Cyclonic storms: 4, 1 unofficial
- Severe cyclonic storms: 0 (record low, tied with 2012)
- Total fatalities: 264 total
- Total damage: > $21.4 million (2005 USD)

Related articles
- 2005 Atlantic hurricane season; 2005 Pacific hurricane season; 2005 Pacific typhoon season

The 2005 North Indian Ocean cyclone season was a deadly and destructive season that occurred through areas across Southern India, despite featuring a lack of very intense tropical cyclones. The basin covers the Indian Ocean north of the equator as well as inland areas, sub-divided by the Arabian Sea and the Bay of Bengal. Although the season began early with two systems in January, the bulk of activity was confined from September to December. The official India Meteorological Department tracked 12 depressions in the basin, and the unofficial Joint Typhoon Warning Center (JTWC) monitored two additional storms. Three systems intensified into a cyclonic storm, which have sustained winds of at least 63 km/h (39 mph), at which point the IMD named them.

The first official storm of the season was Cyclonic Storm Hibaru, which formed southeast of Sri Lanka in January. After nearly five months of inactivity, two depressions formed toward the end of June on opposite sides of India. The depression in the Arabian Sea was one of only two in that body of water during the year, the other of which formed in September and killed 13 people. The other was a depression that formed over land and killed 26 people in Madhya Pradesh, followed by another depression in July that killed one person. A series of deadly storms affected southeastern India beginning in September; a depression killed six people in Madhya Pradesh, Cyclonic Storm Pyarr killed 91 people, an unclassified tropical storm killed 16 people in nearby Bangladesh, and a deep depression in October killed 100 people in Andhra Pradesh. December was active, with cyclonic storms Baaz and Fanoos hitting southern India, resulting in 11 fatalities, and a deep depression remaining over waters in the middle of the month.

== Season summary ==
During the season, the India Meteorological Department (IMD) tracked cyclonic disturbances in the region, as part of them being the designated Regional Specialized Meteorological Center, covering the waters north of the Indian Ocean north of the equator from 45° E to 100° E. The activity was separated between the Bay of Bengal and the Arabian Sea, although there were no cyclonic storms in the latter region. The tropical systems were tracked using satellite imagery and the Dvorak technique, while forecasts were based on cyclone models. There were a total of 12 depressions during the year, three less than normal, although the highest since 1992. The IMD named four cyclonic storms, a process they initiated in 2004, which was also below normal. No systems strengthened beyond cyclonic storm status.

The season was the sixth in a row with below normal activity, based on the seasonal accumulated cyclone energy. Storms generally develop when the monsoon trough is located over tropical waters, with a peak from May to June and another peak in November. The monsoon developed 11 distinct low-pressure areas by the end of September, including five monsoon depressions, and the monsoon season was more active than usual.

== Systems ==
=== Cyclonic Storm Hibaru ===
- Cyclonic storm (IMD)
- Tropical storm (SSHWS)
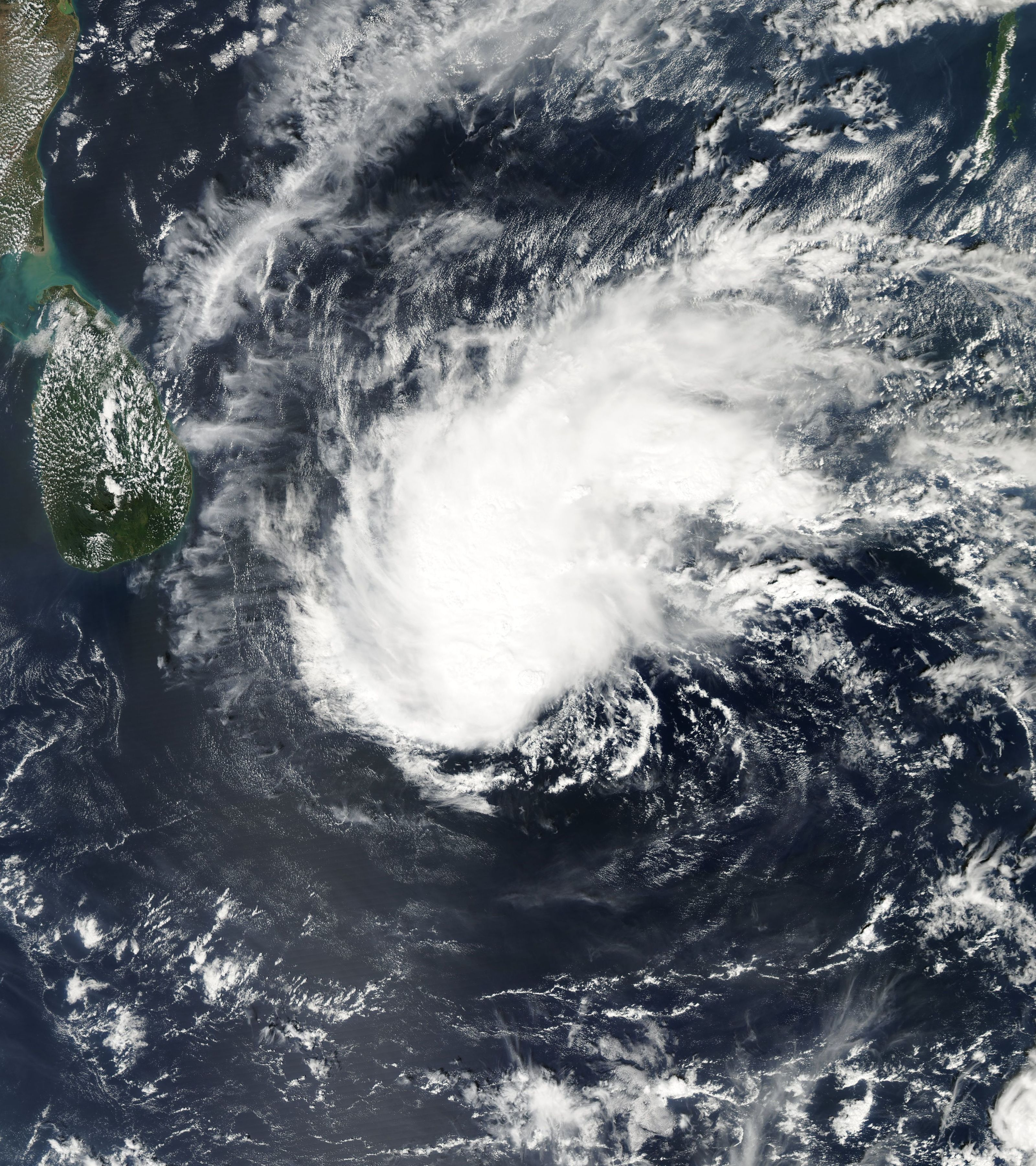
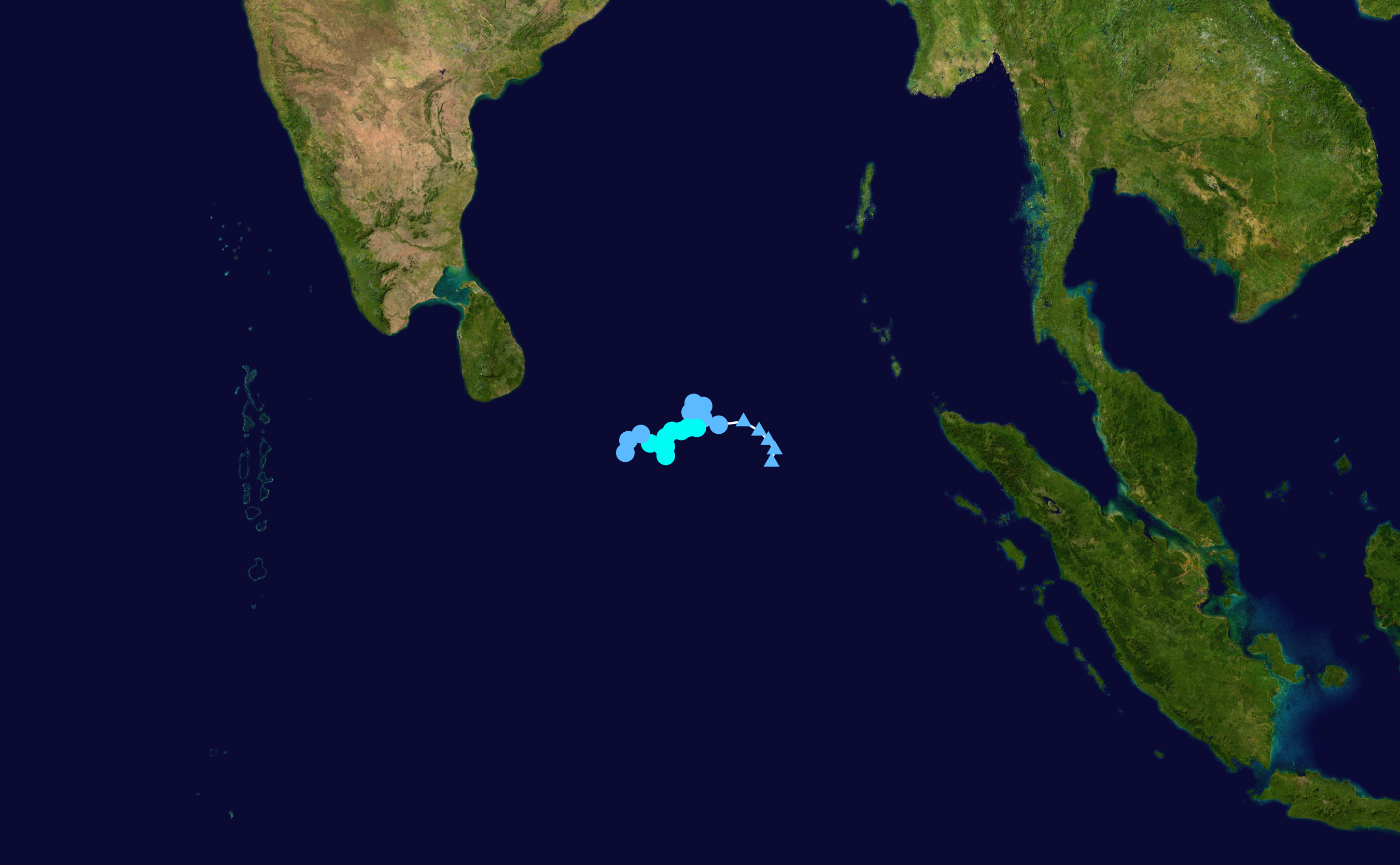
- Duration: January 13 – January 17
- Peak intensity: 65 km/h (40 mph) (3-min); 1000 hPa (mbar)

An area of convection formed at a low latitude to the southeast of Sri Lanka on January 10, located within a broad trough and in an area of low wind shear. Over the next few days, the convection consolidated as an elongated circulation became evident. On January 13, the IMD designated the system as a depression. The system organized further and developed rainbands. A ridge to the north caused the depression to move erratically and remain generally stationary. The IMD upgraded the system to a deep depression on January 14, the same day that the JTWC classified it as Tropical Cyclone 02B. On the next day, the IMD upgraded it further to Cyclonic Storm Hibaru, estimating winds of 65 km/h (40 mph), marking an unusual occasion for such a low-latitude storm in January. (Note: The name Hibaru (Dhivehi: ހިބަރު, [hibäɾu]) was contributed by the Maldives and means "swordfish, marlin" in Dhivehi.) Drifting southward, the circulation gradually became exposed from the convection, indicative of the weakening. Hibaru degenerated into a remnant low on January 17.

=== Land Depression 01 ===
- Depression (IMD)
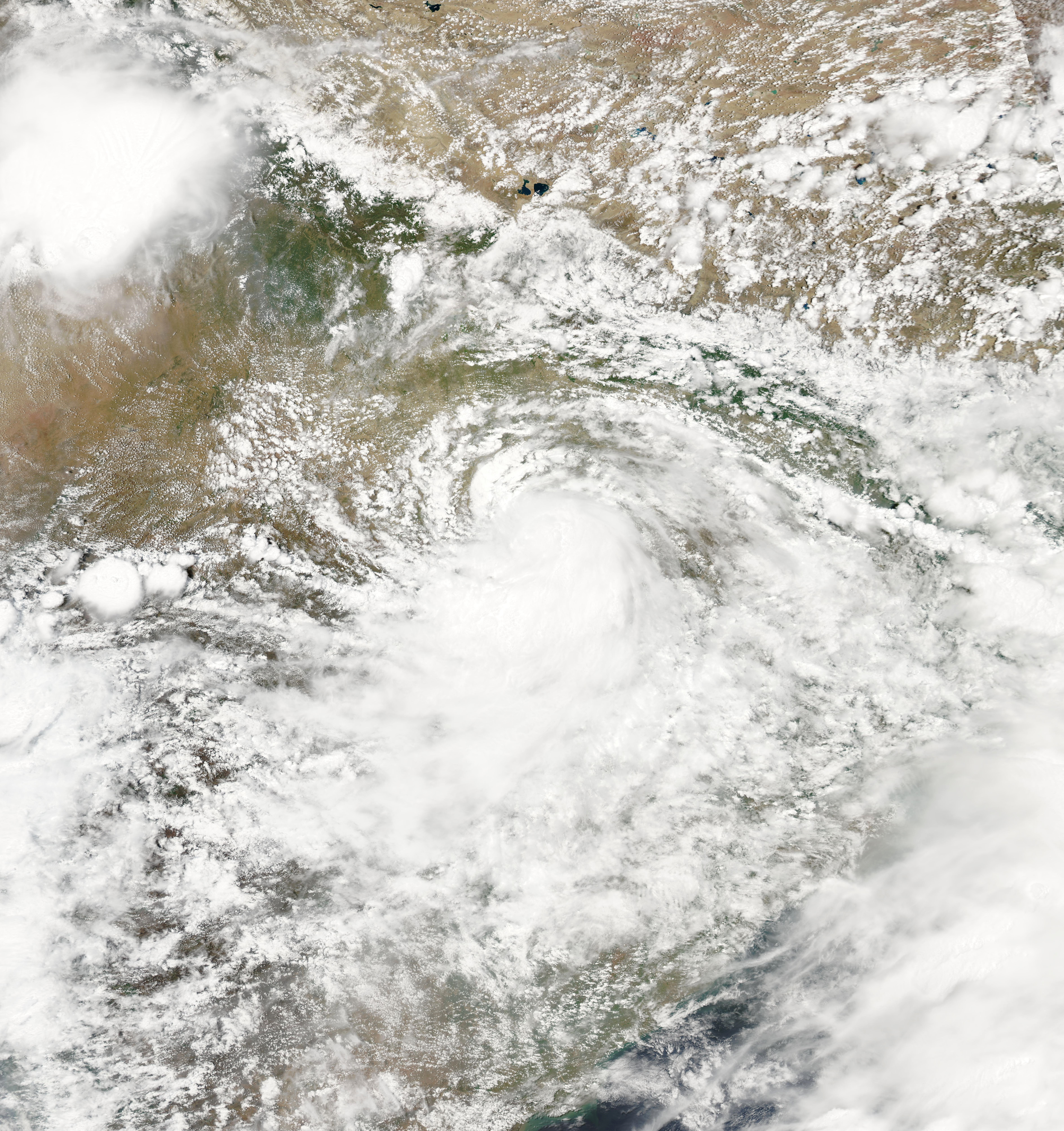
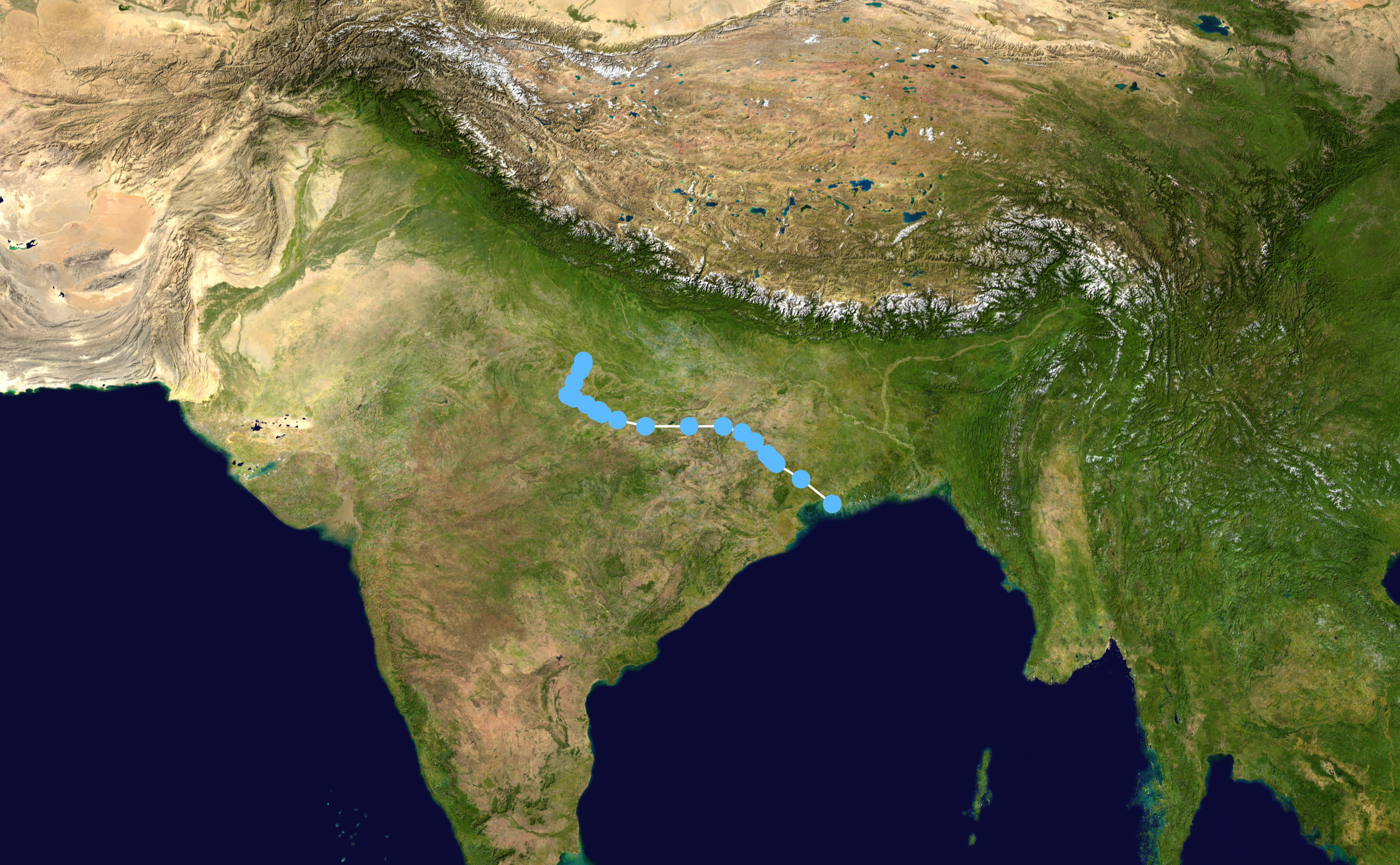
- Duration: June 27 – July 5
- Peak intensity: 45 km/h (30 mph) (3-min); 990 hPa (mbar)

Early on June 27, a low-pressure area formed over the extreme northwestern portion of the Bay of Bengal. Soon after it moved ashore near Kolkata, and the system organized into a depression over West Bengal with winds of 45 km/h (30 mph). For several days the system maintained its intensity while moving northwestward, stalling on July 1 for three days over Madhya Pradesh. It later turned to the northeast and dissipated over Uttar Pradesh on July 6.

The depression produced widespread rainfall across eastern India. Sagar, Madhya Pradesh recorded 480 mm (19 in) in 24 hours, the highest daily total. The rains helped cut India's rainfall deficit by enhancing the monsoon. Rains first affected Odisha, where rivers overflowed and inundated adjacent crop fields. As the storm stalled over Madhya Pradesh, it produced widespread flooding that isolated 129 villages, killing 26 people. Over a four-day period, nearly 900 mm (35 in) of rain fell across parts of the Katni district. The floods cut off communications, washed away a bridge, and damaged many roads.

=== Cyclonic Storm Pyarr ===
- Cyclonic storm (IMD)
- Tropical storm (SSHWS)
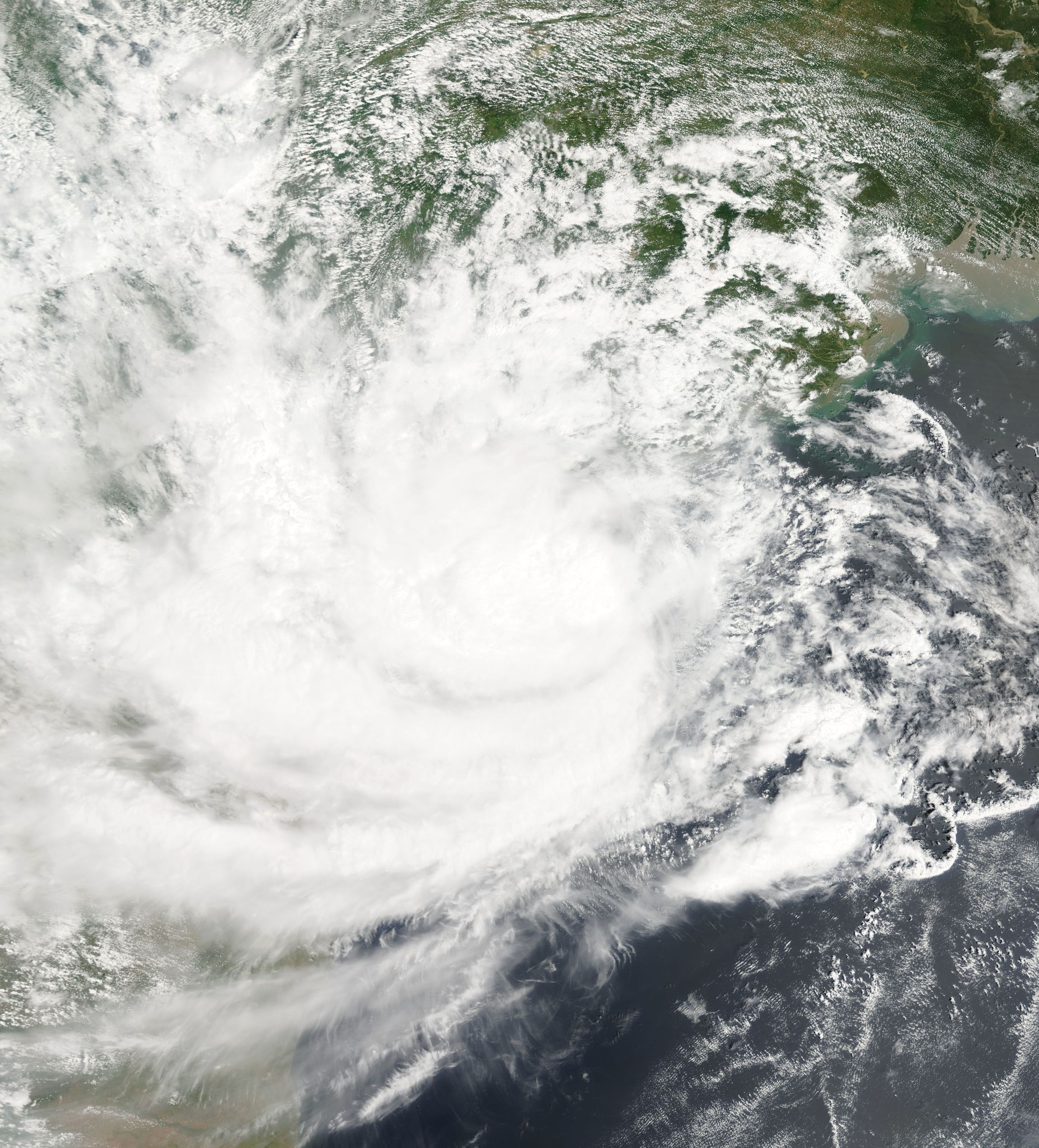
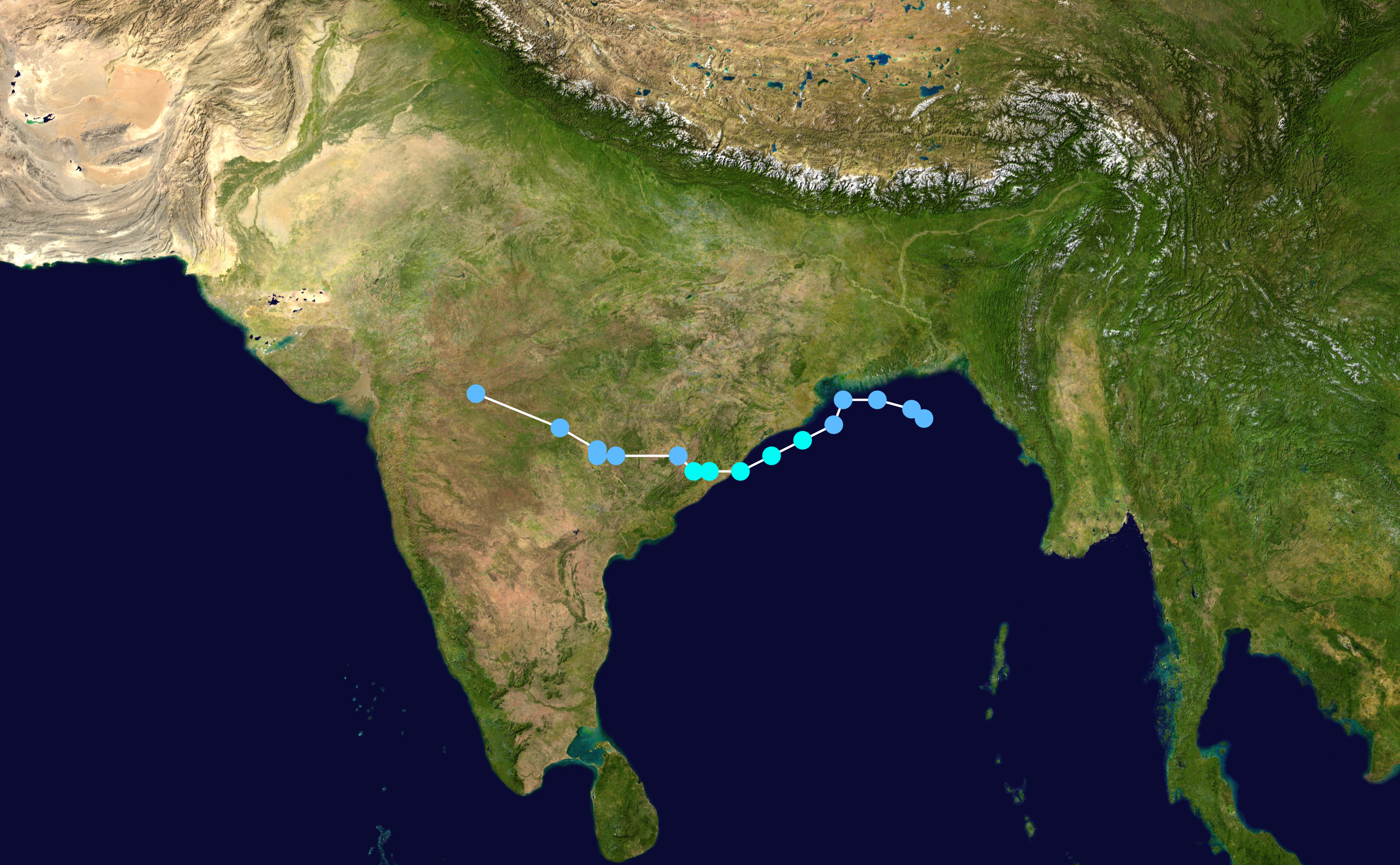
- Duration: September 17 – September 21
- Peak intensity: 65 km/h (40 mph) (3-min); 988 hPa (mbar)

A tropical depression developed in the South China Sea on September 12 and moved westward into central Vietnam on the next day. Continuing through Laos and Thailand, the system emerged into the northern Andaman Sea on September 15. Tracked continuously as a depression by the Thai Meteorological Department, it was classified as a depression by the IMD on September 17 west of Myanmar. On the next day, the system intensified into a deep depression and later cyclonic storm, whereupon the IMD named it Pyarr. (Note: The name Pyarr (Burmese: ပျား, [pjá]) was contributed by Myanmar and means "bee" in Burmese.) It was the first cyclonic storm in the month in seven years. Attaining peak winds of 65 km/h (40 mph), the storm took an unusual track to the southwest. On September 19, Pyarr made landfall just northeast of Kalingapatnam in Andhra Pradesh. It turned westward and weakened over land, deteriorating into a remnant low on September 22 over Madhya Pradesh.

As a depression, the system produced damaging swells along coastal Bangladesh, forcing 12,000 people to evacuate. Offshore, an estimated 9,000 fishermen in roughly 600 vessels were caught in the storm; 15–20 of these ships capsized with 85 people collectively aboard. At least 16 were known to have died. Torrential rainfall affected eastern coastal India, with a daily peak of 490 mm (19 in) in Kunavaram. The rains caused rivers to rise, forcing 36,000 people to evacuate after 315 villages were affected. The floods killed 10,000 cattle and killed four people in Khammam. Pyarr also wrecked 482,188 ha (1,191,510 acres) of crop fields. In Andhra Pradesh, the storm damaged or destroyed 12,041 houses, with overall damage estimated at ₹503 million (2005 Indian rupees, $11.4 million United States dollars). More than 140,000 people were forced to relocate after the Godavari and Krishna rivers burst their banks and caused tremendous flooding. At least 75 people died across Andhra Pradesh.

=== Deep Depression BOB 04 ===
- Deep depression (IMD)
- Tropical storm (SSHWS)
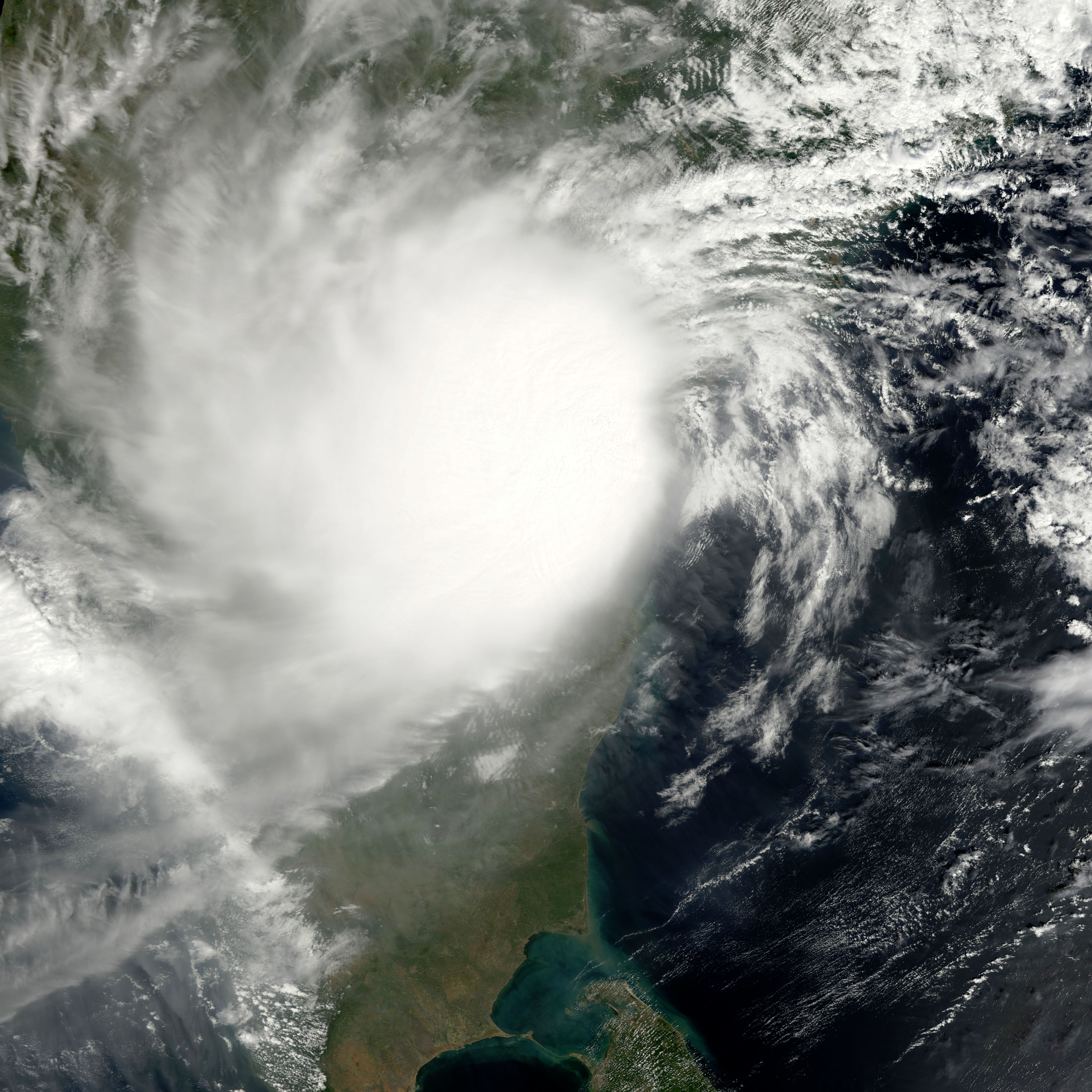
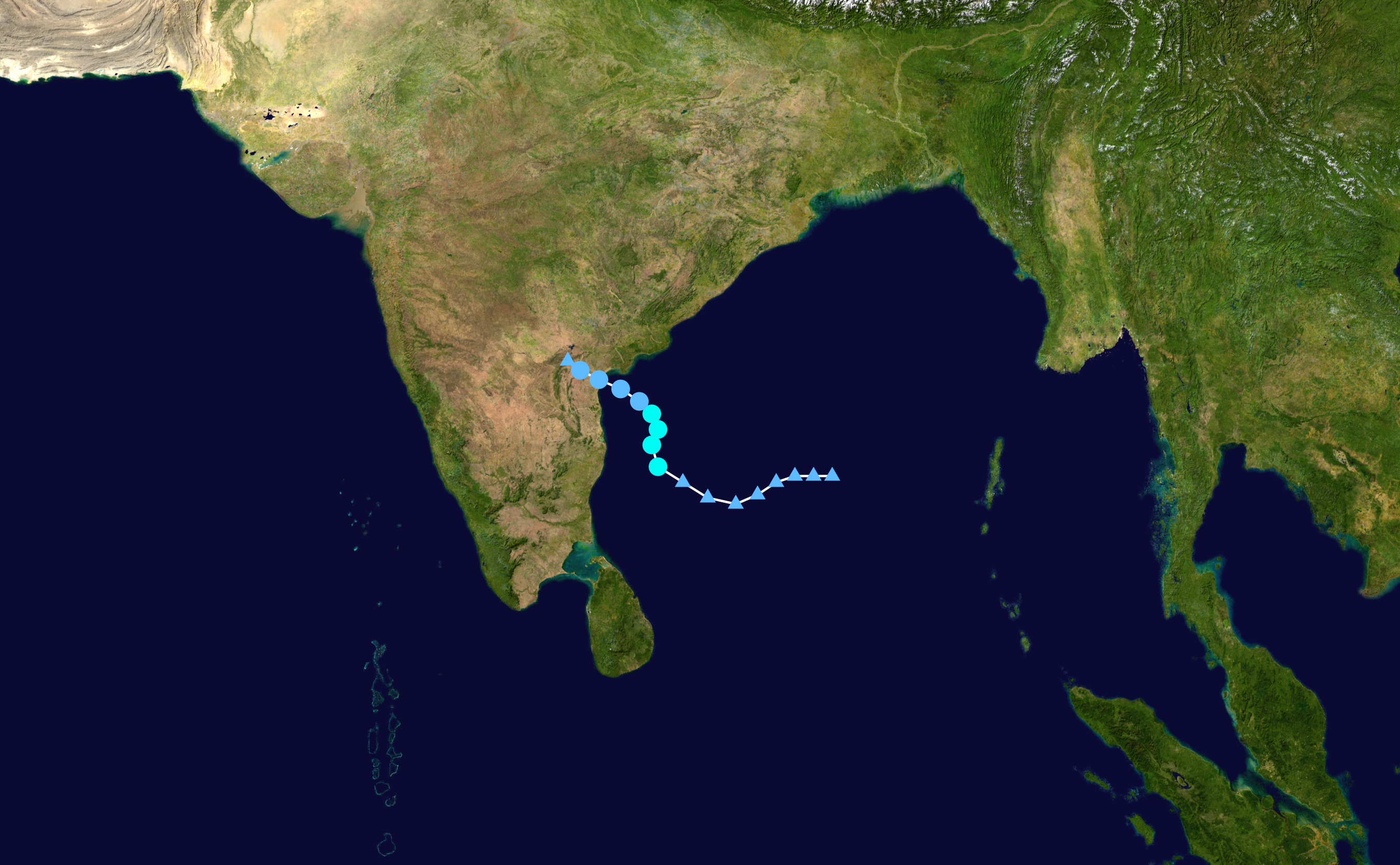
- Duration: October 26 – October 29
- Peak intensity: 55 km/h (35 mph) (3-min); 998 hPa (mbar)

A low-pressure area formed in the western Bay of Bengal on October 25. It had a well-defined circulation, helped by low wind shear and good outflow. The IMD classified it as a depression on October 26, and later that day upgraded it to a deep depression. Moving northwestward, the system moved ashore near Ongole, Andhra Pradesh early on October 28. The depression rapidly weakened over land, degenerating into a remnant low the next day.

Heavy rainfall affected coastal Andhra Pradesh, with a daily peak of 350 mm (14 in) in Kavali. In Tamil Nadu to the south, Chennai recorded 420 mm (17 in) of rainfall. The storm brought several days of heavy rainfall to southern India, forcing 50,000 people to evacuate. Low-lying areas of Chennai were inundated, disrupting travel by road, rail, and air, and causing schools to close. A car was washed away, killing three people in the city. Two people in Chennai were electrocuted, and the provincial electric board shut off power in heavily flooded areas. The rains flooded 194,423 ha (480,430 acres) of crop fields and inundated many rail lines. Across Andhra Pradesh, 1,045 houses collapsed, and the rains killed at least 100 people.

=== Cyclonic Storm Baaz ===
- Cyclonic storm (IMD)
- Tropical storm (SSHWS)
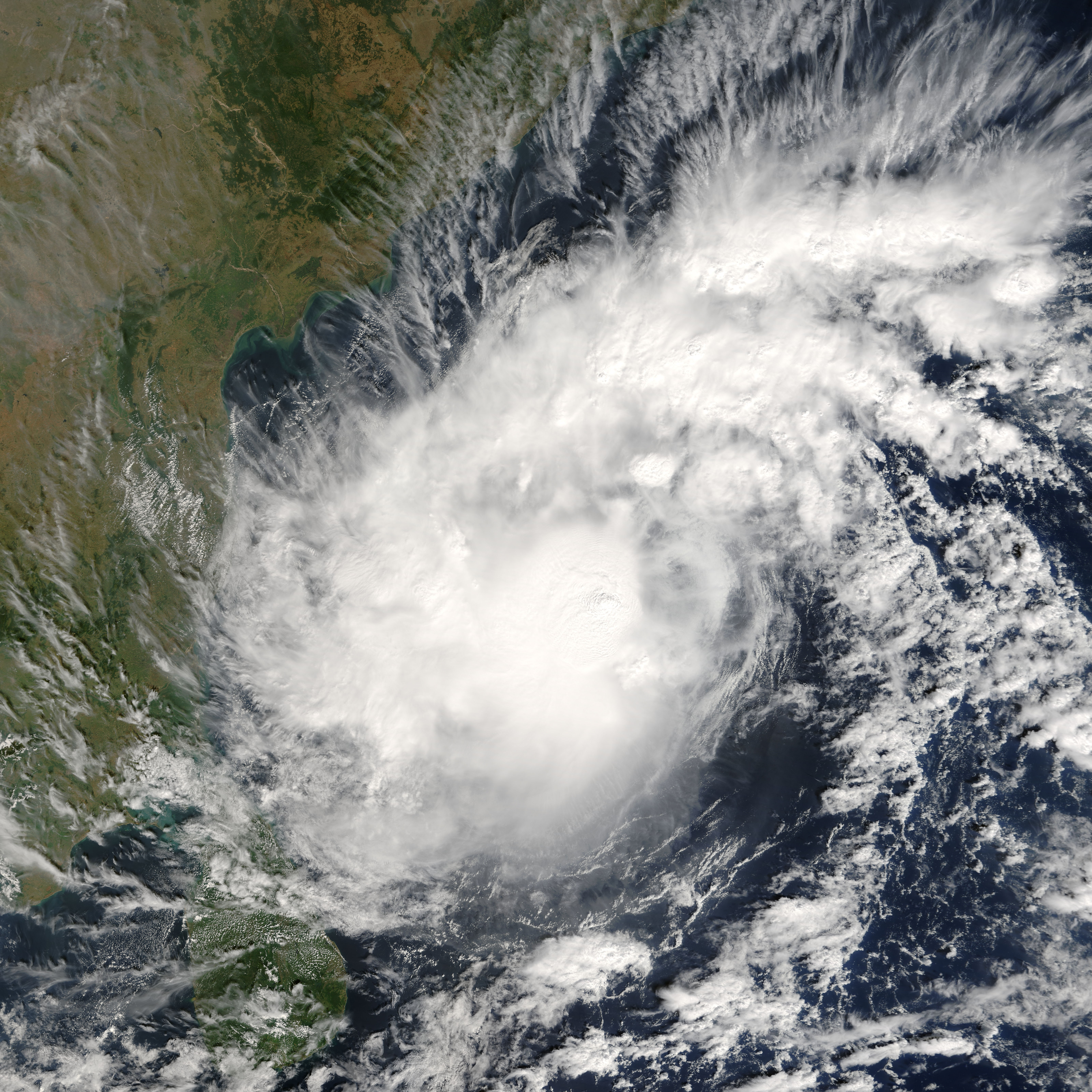
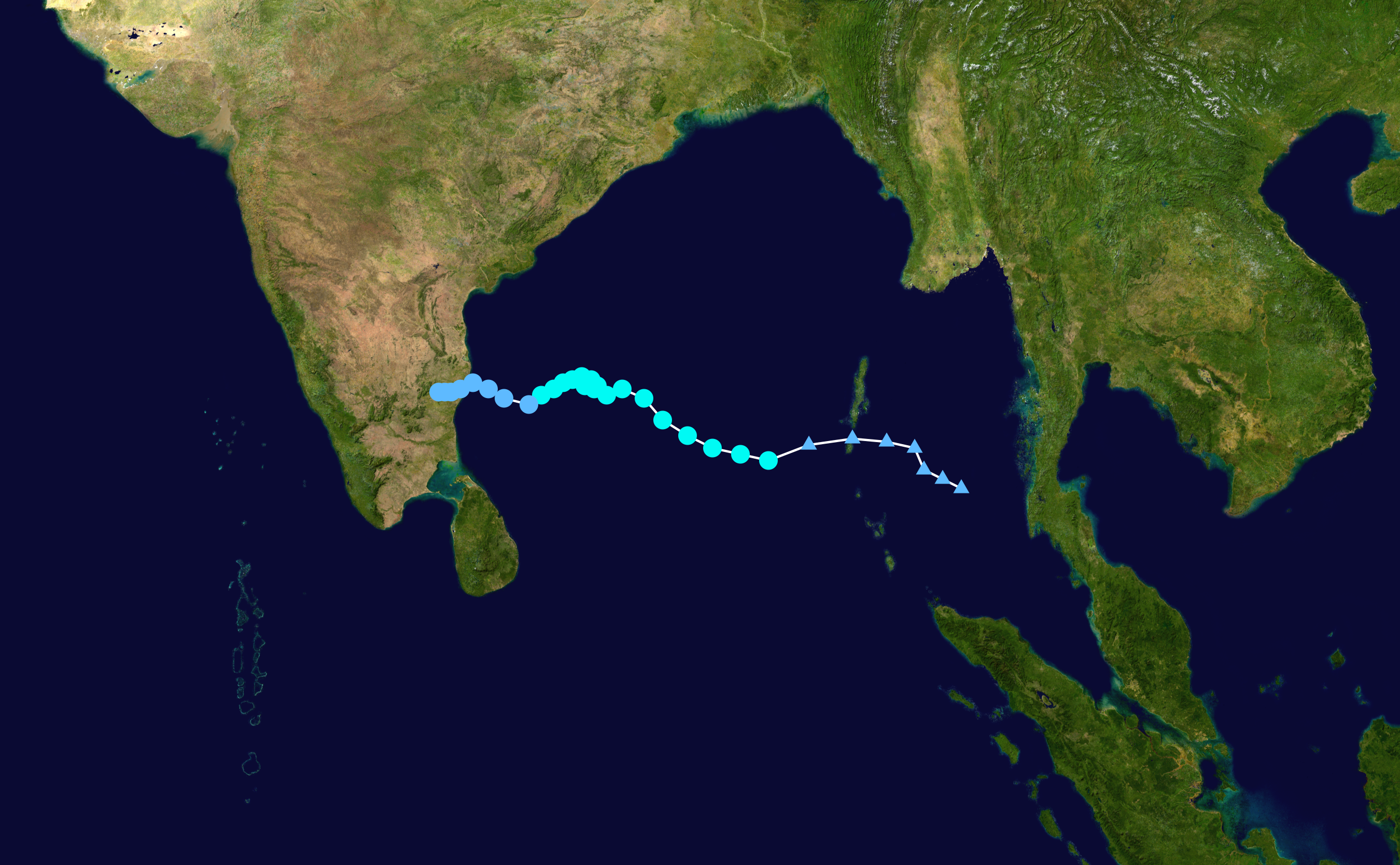
- Duration: November 28 – December 2
- Peak intensity: 85 km/h (50 mph) (3-min); 998 hPa (mbar)

An area of convection formed on November 26 in the eastern Bay of Bengal within an area of moderate wind shear. As the shear decreased, the convection organized about a developing circulation. On November 27, the JTWC classified the system as Tropical Cyclone 07B, and the next day, the IMD classified it as a depression. That day, the agency quickly upgraded it to Cyclonic Storm Baaz. (Note: The name Baaz (Arabic: باز, [baːz]) was contributed by Oman and means "hawk" in Arabic.) By that time, the storm was moving steadily westward due to a ridge to the north. On November 29, the IMD estimated peak 3 minute winds of 85 km/h (55 mph). Increasing wind shear weakened Baaz on December 1, in conjunction with the storm turning to the west-northwest. The storm quickly deteriorated, and the IMD downgraded it to a remnant low on December 2, the same day that the JTWC issued their final advisory. The remnants continued to the west, eventually crossing the Indian coast north of Pondicherry on December 3.

The precursor to the storm brought heavy rainfall to southern Thailand, reaching 417 mm (16.4 in) in Ko Samui. The rains killed 11 people in the country and caused ฿400 million (Thai baht, US$10 million) in damage. The remnants also dropped heavy rainfall in southern India, with a daily peak of 310 mm (12 in) in Tambaram. The rains flooded several villages in Tamil Nadu, killing 11 people.

=== Cyclonic Storm Fanoos ===
- Cyclonic storm (IMD)
- Tropical storm (SSHWS)
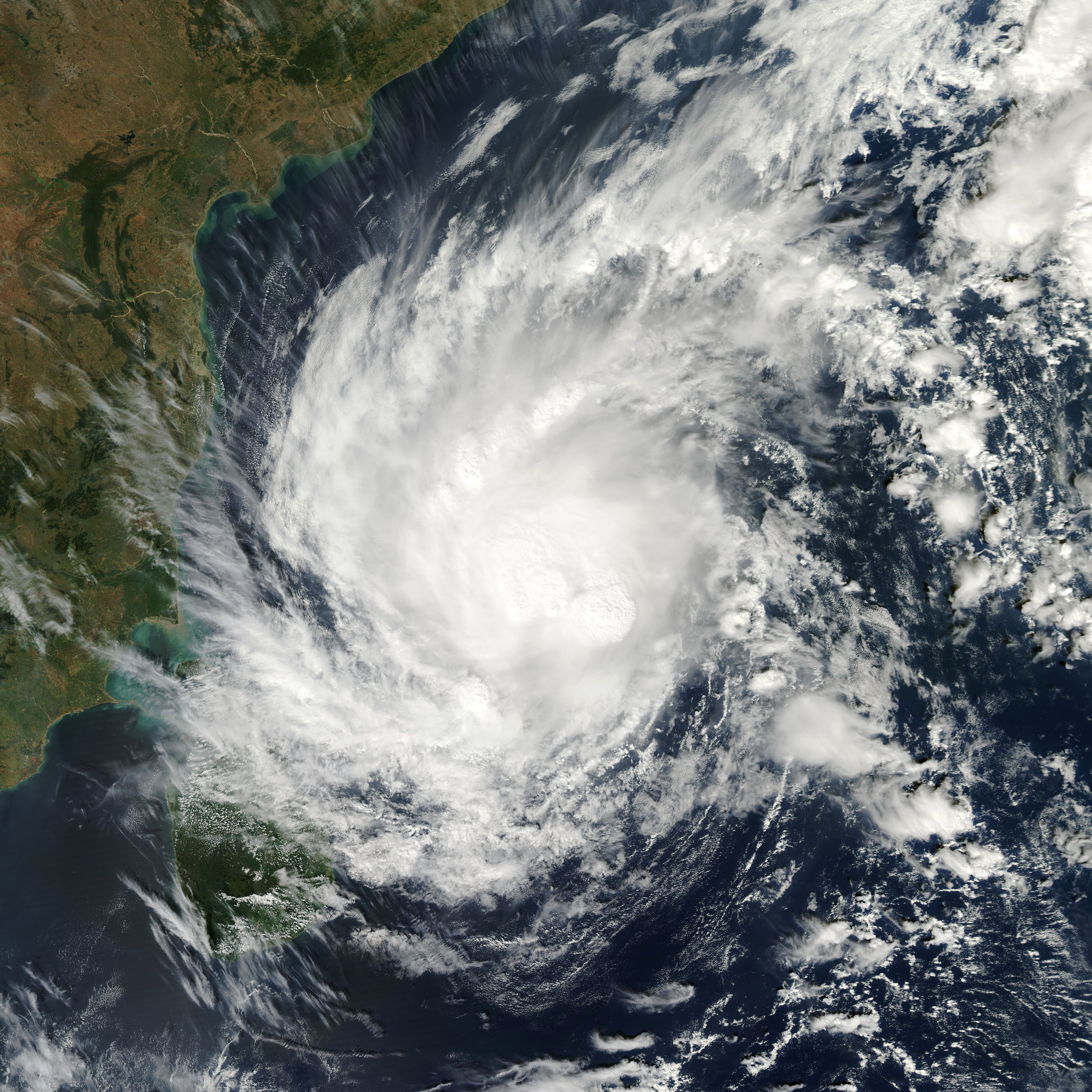
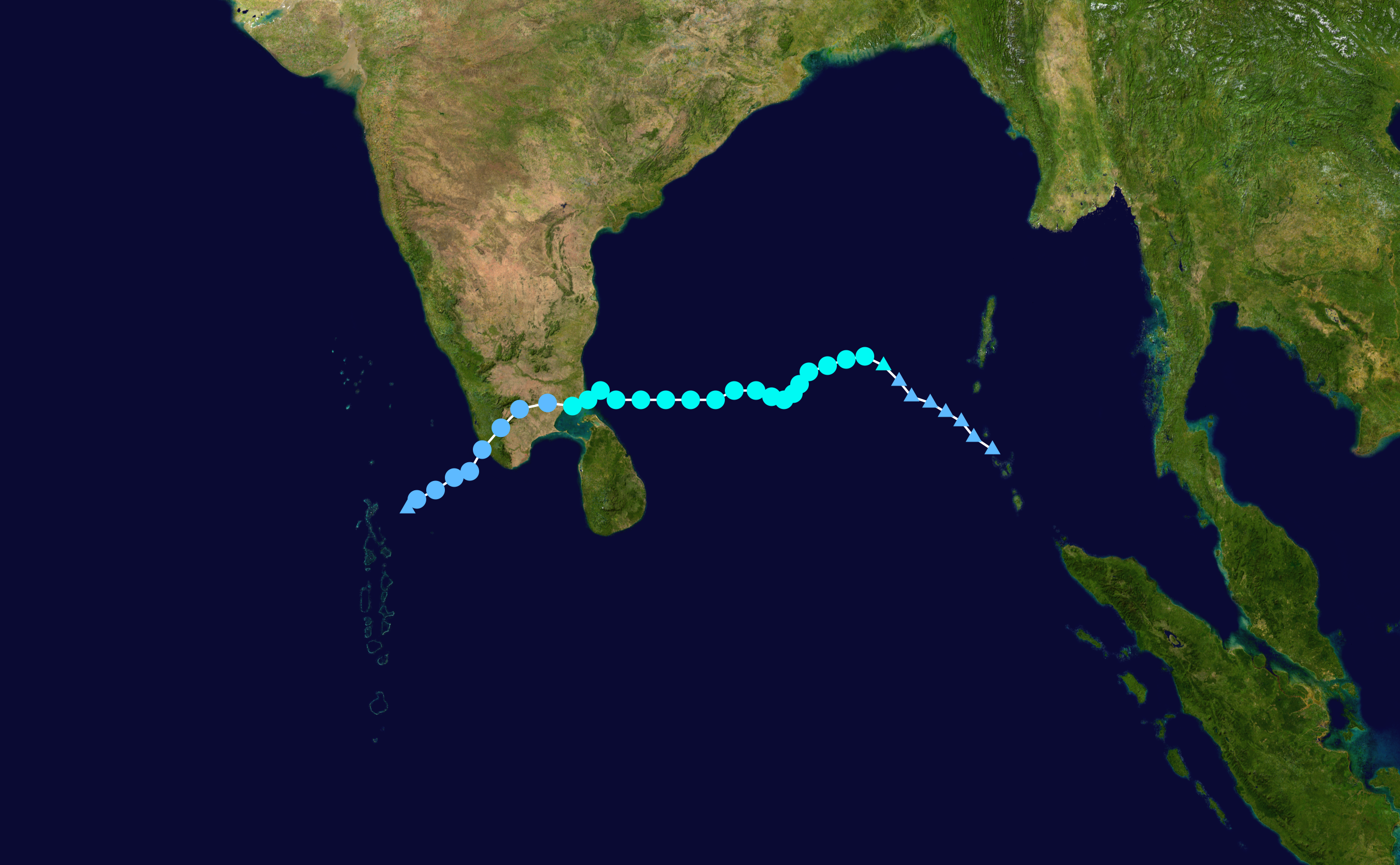
- Duration: December 6 – December 10
- Peak intensity: 85 km/h (50 mph) (3-min); 998 hPa (mbar)

A low-pressure area developed on December 4 in the south Andaman Sea. It consisted of a circulation with increasingly organized convection. The system moved west-southwestward through the Bay of Bengal due to a ridge to the north, organizing into a depression two days later. That day, the JTWC also classified it as Tropical Cyclone 06B. Moderate wind shear allowed the system to strengthen further, and the IMD classified it as Cyclonic Storm Fanoos early on December 7. (Note: The name Fanoos (Urdu: فانوس, [fɑːnuːs]) was contributed by Pakistan and refers to traditional lanterns used in the month of Ramadan in Urdu.) Later that day, the agency estimated peak 3 minute winds of 85 km/h (55 mph). Two days later, the JTWC estimated peak 1 minute winds of 110 km/h (70 mph) as the storm bypassed northern Sri Lanka. Wind shear and proximity to land weakened Fanoos into a deep depression on December 10, and shortly after it made landfall on eastern Tamil Nadu near Vedaranyam. The IMD downgraded the storm to a remnant low-pressure area later that day, although the JTWC tracked the storm across southern India into the Arabian Sea; the agency stopped following Fanoos on December 12.

The threat of the storm necessitated fishermen to remain at port, while 25,000 people evacuated to shelters. The final landfalling storm of the season, Fanoos brought heavy rainfall to Tamil Nadu, with a daily peak of 350 mm (14 in) in Ramanathapuram. The rains heavily damaged crops across Tamil Nadu, although damage was less than expected. It was the fifth storm to affect southern India in six weeks.

=== Deep Depression BOB 08 ===
- Deep depression (IMD)
- Tropical storm (SSHWS)
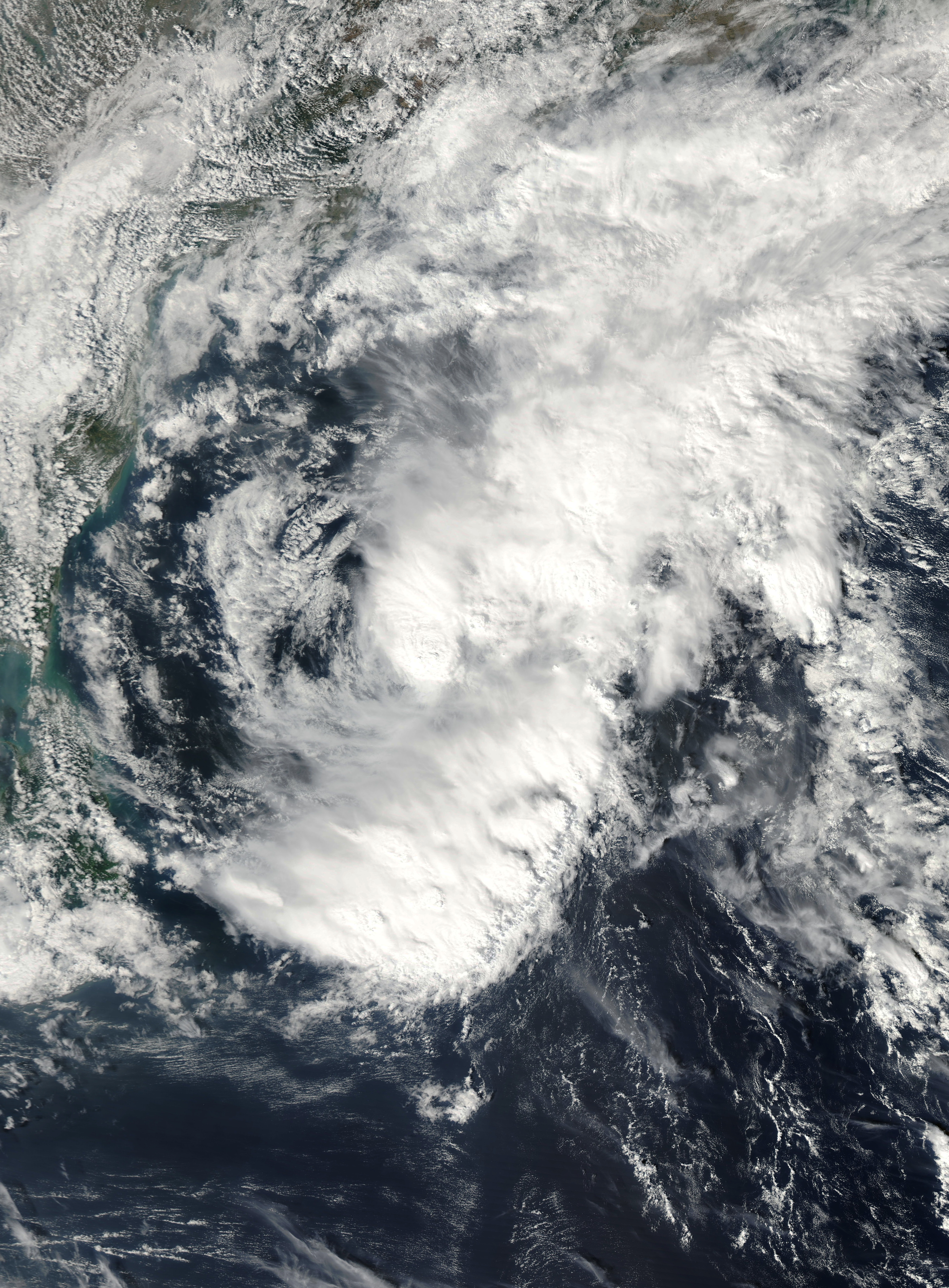
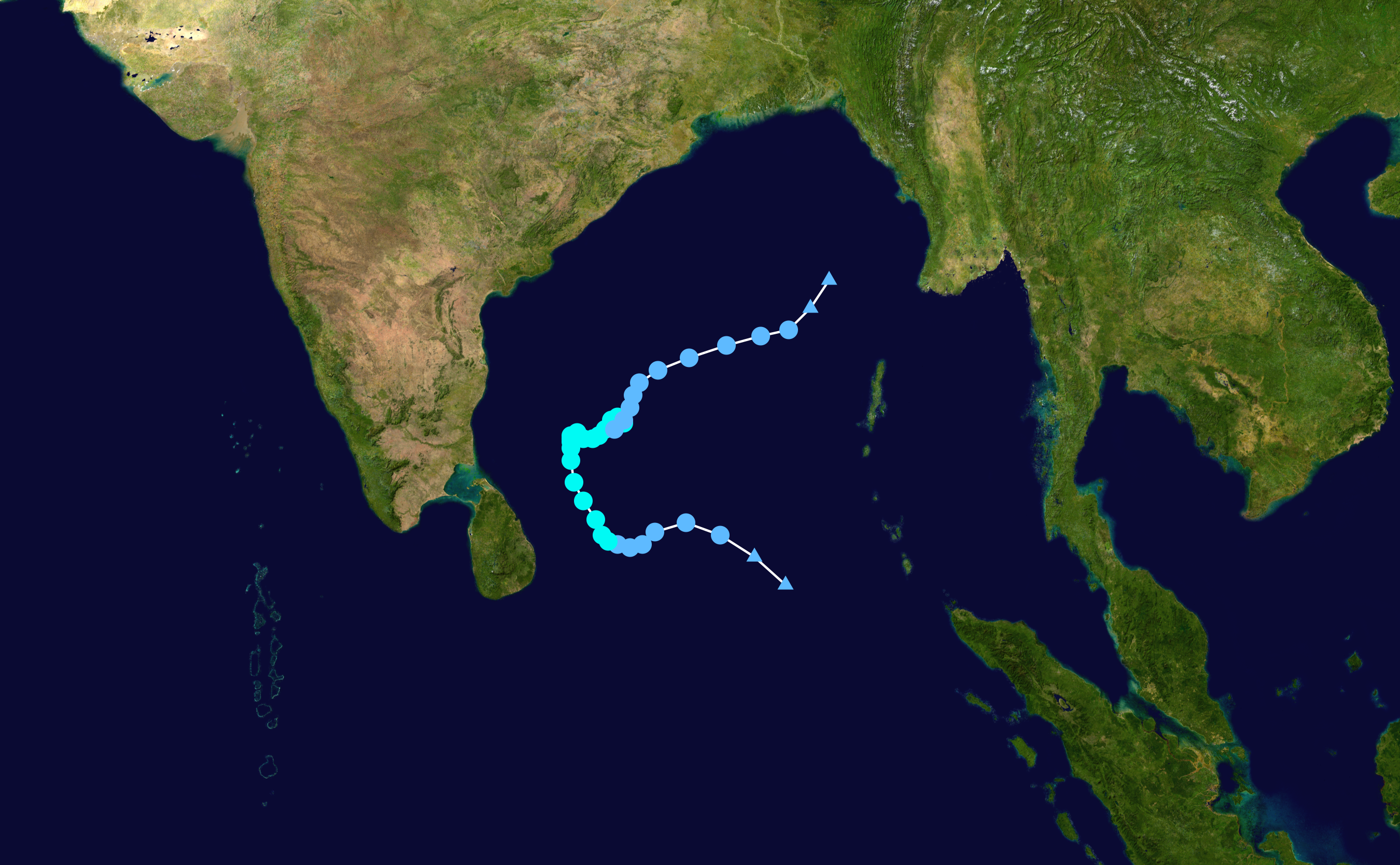
- Duration: December 15 – December 22
- Peak intensity: 55 km/h (35 mph) (3-min); 1000 hPa (mbar)

An area of convection formed on December 14 over the Bay of Bengal with a broad circulation. It was in an area of low wind shear, which allowed for slow development, and it became a depression on December 15. A ridge to the north steered the system to the northwest and later to the west. On December 17, the JTWC classified it as Tropical Cyclone 07B, the same day that the IMD upgraded it to a deep depression with peak 3 minute winds of 55 km/h (35 mph). On the next day, the JTWC estimated peak 1 minute winds of 85 km/h (55 mph). Increasing wind shear prevented further development as the storm turned to the north, keeping it east of Sri Lanka. An approaching trough turned the weakening system to the northeast on December 21, and the next day the IMD downgraded it to a remnant low in the central Bay of Bengal. The outskirts of the system brushed Chennai, with the city receiving 120 mm (4.7 in) of rainfall, although there was no reported damage.

=== Other systems ===
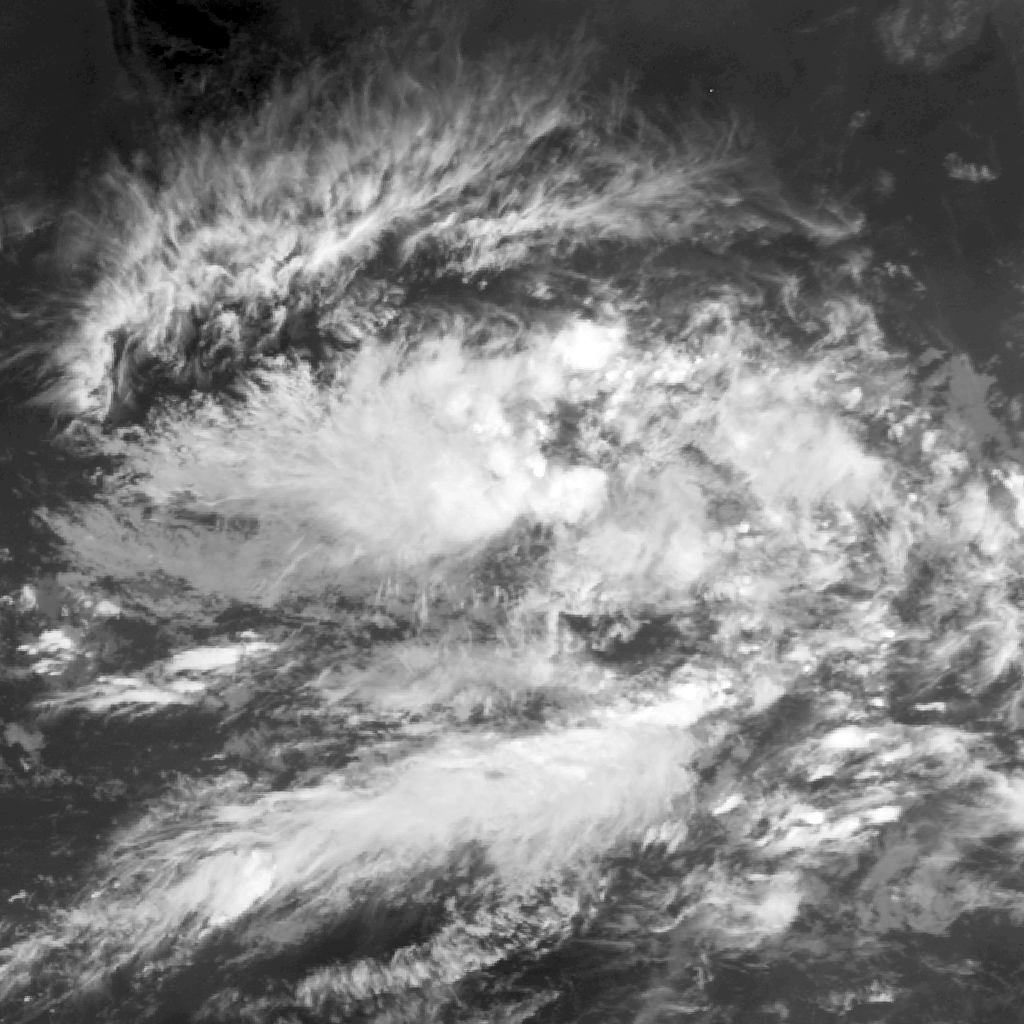
Satellite image of the January tropical depression

The JTWC tracked a short-lived depression in early January. The system formed southeast of Sri Lanka on January 7, days before Hibaru formed. It remained weak as it drifted northward with peak winds of only 55 km/h (35 mph). The depression dissipated on January 10. In the middle of June, an area of convection formed along the monsoon offshore the Saurashtra region of western India. On June 21, a depression developed with winds of 45 km/h (30 mph). Moving to the west-northwest, it dissipated on June 22, bringing light rainfall up to 70 mm (2.8 in) in Gujarat. In late July, a low-pressure area formed in the northwest Bay of Bengal, organizing into a depression on July 29. The system remained nearly stationary just offshore West Bengal. On July 30, the depression intensified into a deep depression. Shortly thereafter, the system moved ashore near Balasore, Odisha. It moved west-northwestward over land, dissipating on July 31. The depression dropped widespread rainfall, peaking at 490 mm (19 in) in Chandabali. The rains swelled rivers and flooded fields, affecting many roadways. One person died after a wall collapsed.

On September 10, a low-pressure area formed in the northwestern Bay of Bengal. Moving to the northwest, it organized into a depression on September 12, and soon after made landfall near Paradip, Odisha with winds of 45 km/h (30 mph). It continued through northeastern India, weakening into a remnant low over Uttar Pradesh on September 17. The depression brought heavy rainfall to eastern India, with a daily peak of 300 mm (12 in) in Nabarangpur. Across Odisha, the rains inundated 75,943 ha (187,660 acres) of crop fields, and later killed six people after flooding villages in Madhya Pradesh. Another low-pressure area formed south of Gujarat on September 13, developing into a depression the next day. It moved slowly to the northwest at first before turning to the east, never attaining wind speeds higher than 45 km/h (30 mph). Late on September 16, the depression struck Gujarat just north of Porbandar and rapidly weakened over land. The system brought rainfall and gusty winds that killed 13 people.

An area of convection formed on October 1 southeast of India. It was located in an area of moderate wind shear. The system moved to the northeast, developing more convection over the circulation. On October 2, the JTWC classified it as Tropical Cyclone 03B, although the IMD never issued warnings on the system. The JTWC estimated peak 1 minute winds of 65 km/h (40 mph). Early on October 3, the storm moved ashore just south of Kolkata, and dissipated soon after. Heavy rains swamped portions of northern Bangladesh causing tremendous flooding that destroyed more than 100,000 mud-built homes. Government officials estimated that 1.5 million people were rendered homeless. Floods also damaged 200,000 hectares (500,000 acres) of crops and 1,000 km (620 mi) of roads. At least 16 people were killed while waterborne diseases in the aftermath threatened to kill dozens more.

A low-pressure area formed in the western Bay of Bengal on November 19. Moving to the west-northwest, it concentrated into a depression on the next day. On November 22, it crossed over Sri Lanka and later degenerated into a remnant low over the Gulf of Mannar, never reaching winds beyond 45 km/h (30 mph). The remnants brought heavy rainfall to Tamil Nadu, with Panruti reporting 540 mm (21 in) of precipitation over 72 hours.

== Season effects ==
This is a table of all of the storms that have formed during the 2005 North Indian Ocean cyclone season. It includes their names, duration, peak strength, areas affected, damage, and death totals. Deaths in parentheses are additional and indirect (an example of an indirect death would be a traffic accident), but were still related to that storm. Damage and deaths include totals while the storm was extratropical, a wave, or a low, and all of the damage figures are in 2005 USD.

Name	Dates	Peak intensity			Areas affected	Damage (USD)	Deaths	Ref(s).
Name	Dates	Category	Wind speed	Pressure	Areas affected	Damage (USD)	Deaths	Ref(s).
Hibaru	January 13–17	Cyclonic storm	65 km/h (40 mph)	1,000 hPa (29.53 inHg)	None	None	None	
ARB 01	June 21–22	Depression	45 km/h (30 mph)	992 hPa (29.29 inHg)	Gujarat	None	None	
Land 01	June 27 – July 5	Land depression	45 km/h (30 mph)	990 hPa (29.23 inHg)	East India, North India, Central India	Unknown	26	
BOB 02	July 29–31	Deep depression	55 km/h (35 mph)	988 hPa (29.18 inHg)	East India, Central India	Unknown	1	
BOB 03	September 12–16	Depression	45 km/h (30 mph)	992 hPa (29.29 inHg)	East India, North India, Central India	Unknown	6	
ARB 02	September 14–16	Depression	45 km/h (30 mph)	996 hPa (29.41 inHg)	Gujarat	Unknown	13	
Pyarr	September 17–21	Cyclonic storm	65 km/h (40 mph)	988 hPa (29.18 inHg)	Bangladesh, East India, Central India, South India	$11.4 million	91	
BOB 04	October 26–29	Deep depression	55 km/h (35 mph)	998 hPa (29.47 inHg)	South India	Unknown	105	
BOB 05	November 20–22	Depression	45 km/h (30 mph)	1,002 hPa (29.59 inHg)	Sri Lanka, South India	None	None	
Baaz	November 28 – December 2	Cyclonic storm	85 km/h (55 mph)	998 hPa (29.47 inHg)	Thailand, South India, East India	$10 million	22	
Fanoos	December 6–10	Cyclonic storm	85 km/h (55 mph)	998 hPa (29.47 inHg)	South India, Sri Lanka	Unknown	None	
BOB 08	December 15–22	Deep depression	55 km/h (35 mph)	1,000 hPa (29.53 inHg)	South India	None	None	
Season aggregates
14 systems	January 8 – December 22		85 km/h (55 mph)	988 hPa (29.18 inHg)		>$21.4 million	264	

== See also ==
- Tropical cyclones in 2005
- Maharashtra floods of 2005
- North Indian Ocean tropical cyclone
- 2005 Atlantic hurricane season
- 2005 Pacific hurricane season
- 2005 Pacific typhoon season
- South-West Indian Ocean cyclone seasons: 2004–05, 2005–06
- Australian region cyclone seasons: 2004–05, 2005–06
- South Pacific cyclone seasons: 2004–05, 2005–06
