= Typhoons in Taiwan =

Tropical cyclones in Taiwan

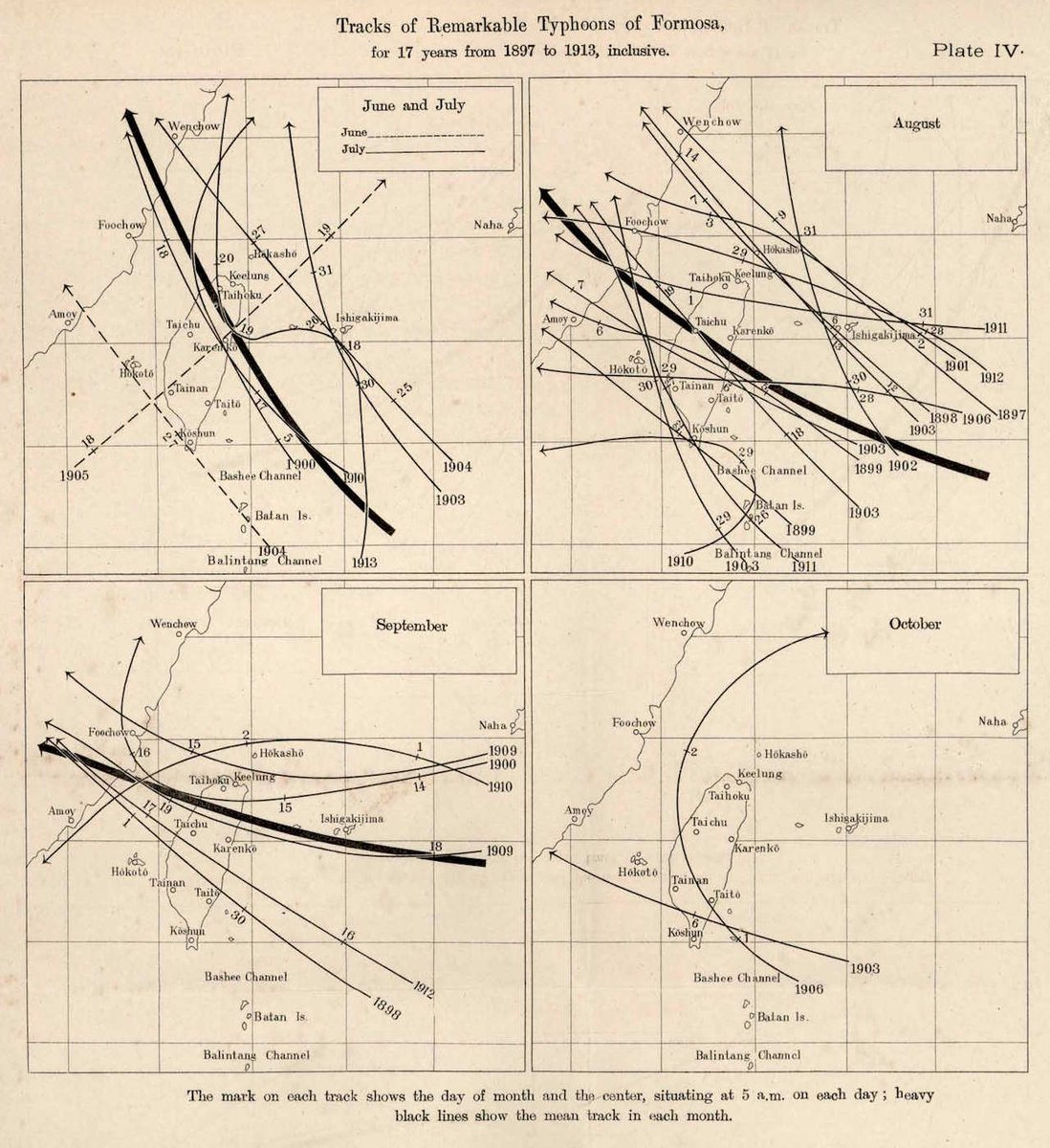
Typhoon tracks going to Taiwan.

Taiwan is one of the most typhoon-prone countries in East Asia, just near the Philippines. Multiple typhoons enter Taiwan every year, out of tens of typhoons in the West Pacific. Typhoons regularly enter east of the country, making its way to the western side, if no obstructions are found.

Typhoon Morakot (Note: Known in the Philippines as Typhoon Kiko) is the deadliest typhoon to affect Taiwan, with a category 1 categorization. The typhoon caused an estimated amount of 650 fatalities, with 6.2 billion dollars in damage. (Note: 2009 USD) Another strong typhoon which affected Taiwan is Typhoon Gaemi in 2024, which was the strongest typhoon to hit the island in eight years. (Note: Mostly because Taiwan was presented at the eye of the storm.)

== History ==
=== Pre-1900s ===
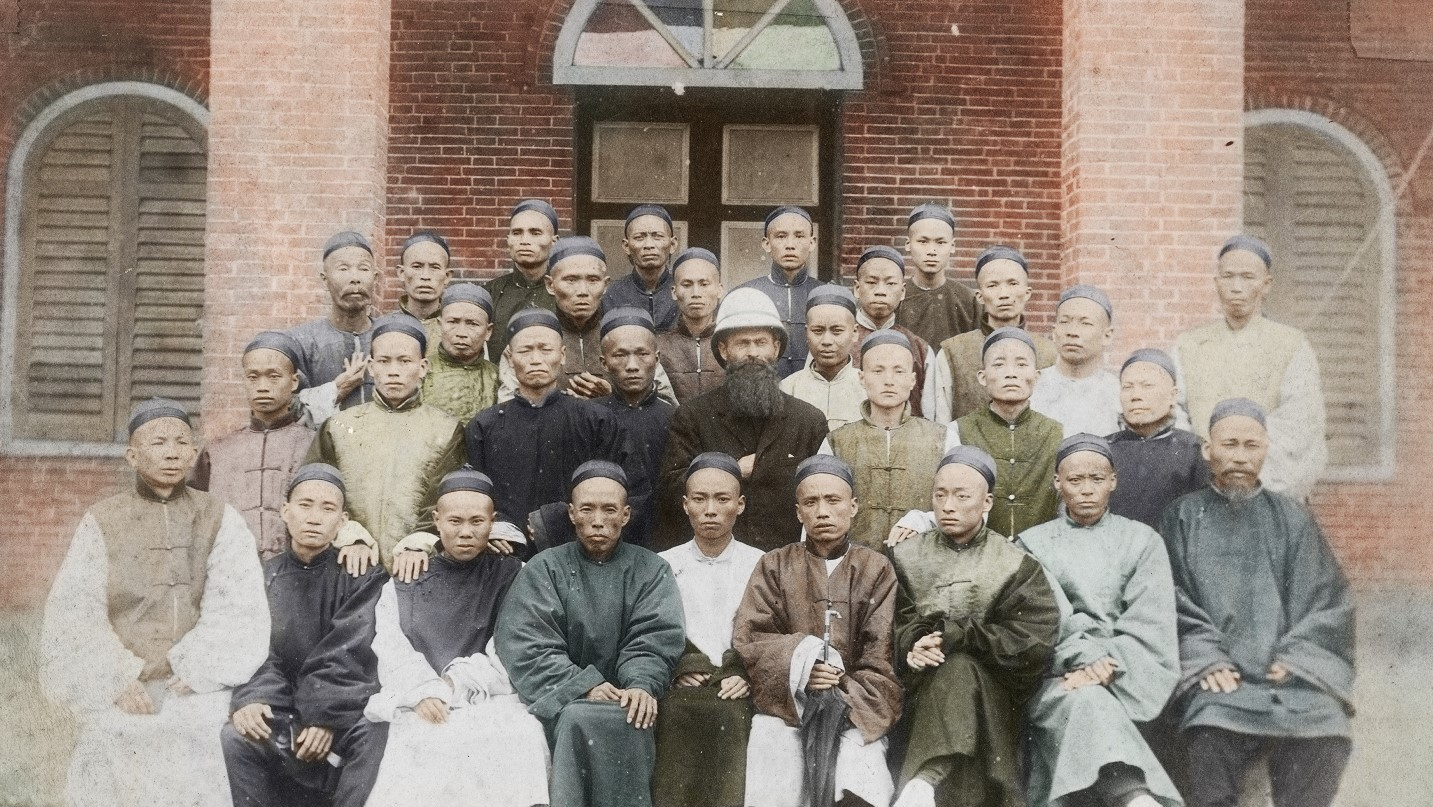
Georgle Leslie Mackay at Taiwan.

A Chinese word, Tai, (meaning Typhoon), appeared in multiple books originating from Taiwan. Weather observatories were later introduced in Taiwan from the late 1890s, during the colonial era of the Japanese armed forces. The 1897 Pacific typhoon season was the first season that the Taiwanese government recorded. In a diary written by George Leslie Mackay, there were observations of 19 typhoons between 1871 and 1894. There were also 15 recorded typhoons in a historical dataset not mentioned by Mackay.

=== World War era (1900-1950) ===
After the 1900s, weather observatories were deemed as an official part of the Governor-General's office. The Best Track data system was also introduced in 1944. Typhoon tracking was also heavily improved after the world wars, with multiple added features.

=== 1950s ===
Multiple records were compiled, including a 100-year compilation from 1897 to 1998.

== Area ==
Taiwan lies in PAGASA's Philippine Area of Responsibility, meaning that a typhoon entering Taiwan will also enter PAGASA's responsibility, automatically giving the typhoon a local name and monitoring and issuing warnings.

== Typhoons ==
=== Pre-1900s ===
A major typhoon, which was the first major recorded typhoon to affect Taiwan, named Typhoon No. 1, was recorded, with the final result appearing in the Governor-General's office. Multiple bridges were broken, with the first operating railway in Taiwan getting destroyed.

=== 1900s ===
==== 1940s ====
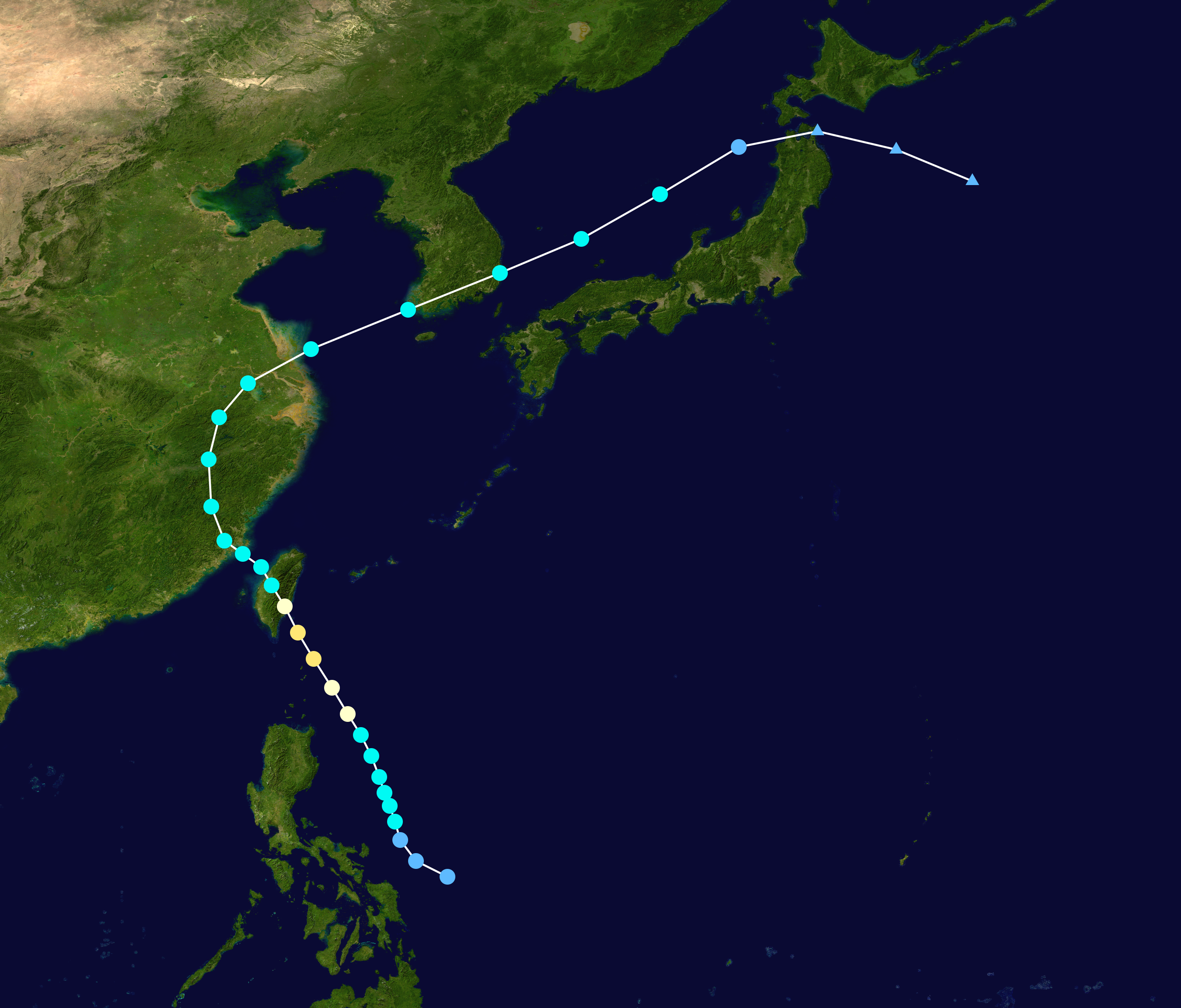
Track of Typhoon Ursula.

In September 1945, Typhoon Ursula directly hit Taiwan, killing 120 army soldiers, and killing another 20 in the ground. A year later, in 1946, Typhoon Querida rounded over Southern Taiwan, killing 154 and damaged 373,000 homes.

=== 2000s ===
==== 2010s ====
In July 2018, Typhoon Maria affected the northern portion of Taiwan. As it passed north, heavy rain and gusty winds marked the temporary closure of schools and workplaces. The typhoon also caused 59,485 households to lose power.

Typhoon Gaemi slowly drifting to Taiwan.

In August 2019, Typhoon Lekima impacted Taiwan, (Note: Indirectly) killing two people and leading 80,000 households to have power outages. The typhoon was also accompanied with a Magnitude 6.0 earthquake. In September, Typhoon Mitag indirectly impacted Taiwan. A warning was created, and the government ordered closure of financial markets and schools among warnings of high winds and floods.

==== 2020s ====
In May 2021, Tropical Storm Choi-wan impacted the eastern side of Taiwan, creating warnings. Roads were flooded, while multiple districts recorded heavy rains. In August, Tropical Storm Lupit impacted Taiwan, multiple warnings were created, with 501 individuals being trapped after a bridge collapse. 4 people were later pronounced dead, and one person was missing. In September, Super-typhoon Typhoon Chanthu impacted the eastern side of Taiwan, making 26,000 homes lose power and adding heavy rainfall to Taiwan, bringing waves a size of 7 metres (23 ft).

In July 2023, Typhoon Doksuri drifted to Southern Taiwan, raising warnings in various places. 278,000 homes later lost power, with one woman dying in Taiwan. In August, Typhoon Haikui directly hit Taiwan, with 8,000 people evacuating. 217,000 houses lost electricity with the typhoon, with multiple floods, and rainfall. In September, Typhoon Koinu passed Taiwan, with classes dismissed, flights cancelled, and record-breaking winds. Two major roads were blocked, with 10.72 million dollars of agricultural damage.

In 2024, a category-4 typhoon named Gaemi, directly hit Taiwan. Hundreds of flights were cancelled, with 8,000 people fleeing to evacuation centers. A total of 10 people was killed, with a ship capsizing, naming it the deadliest typhoon to ever hit Taiwan in eight years.

== Deadliest cyclones ==
Rank	Storm	Date	Deaths	Reference
1	Typhoon Morakot	August 2009	789	
2	Typhoon Doksuri	July 2023	137	
3	Typhoon Gaemi	July 2024	126	
4	Typhoon Lekima	August 2019	105	
5	Typhoon Thelma (1977)	July 1977	28	
6	Typhoon Mitag	September 2019	22	
7	Typhoon Krathon	September ~ October 2024	4	

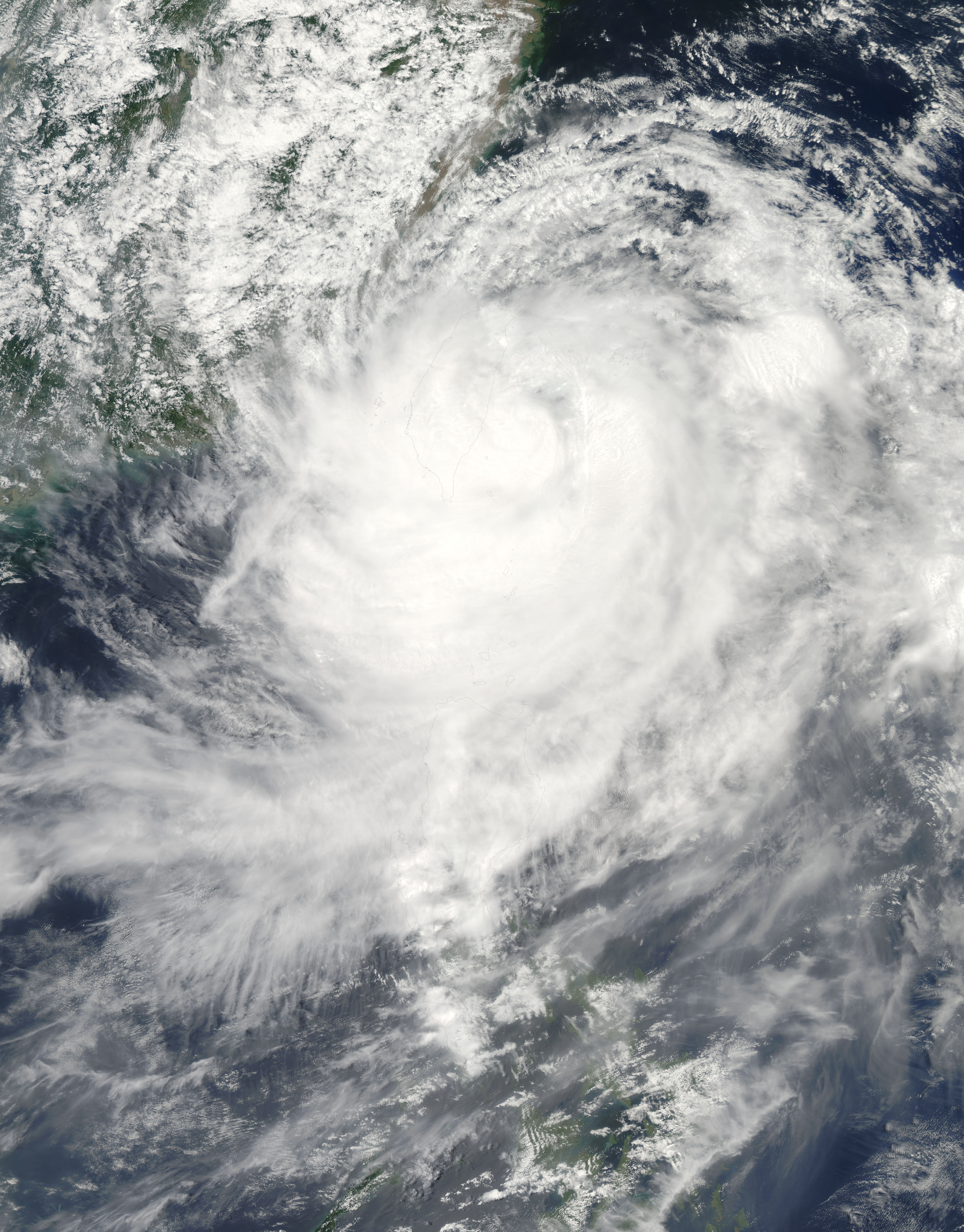
Typhoon Morakot, the deadliest typhoon to ever affect Taiwan.

== See also ==
- Typhoons in the Philippines, a similar list for a neighboring country, affected mostly with the same typhoons.
