= Typhoon Danas (2025) =

Pacific typhoon in 2025

Typhoon Danas (Bising)
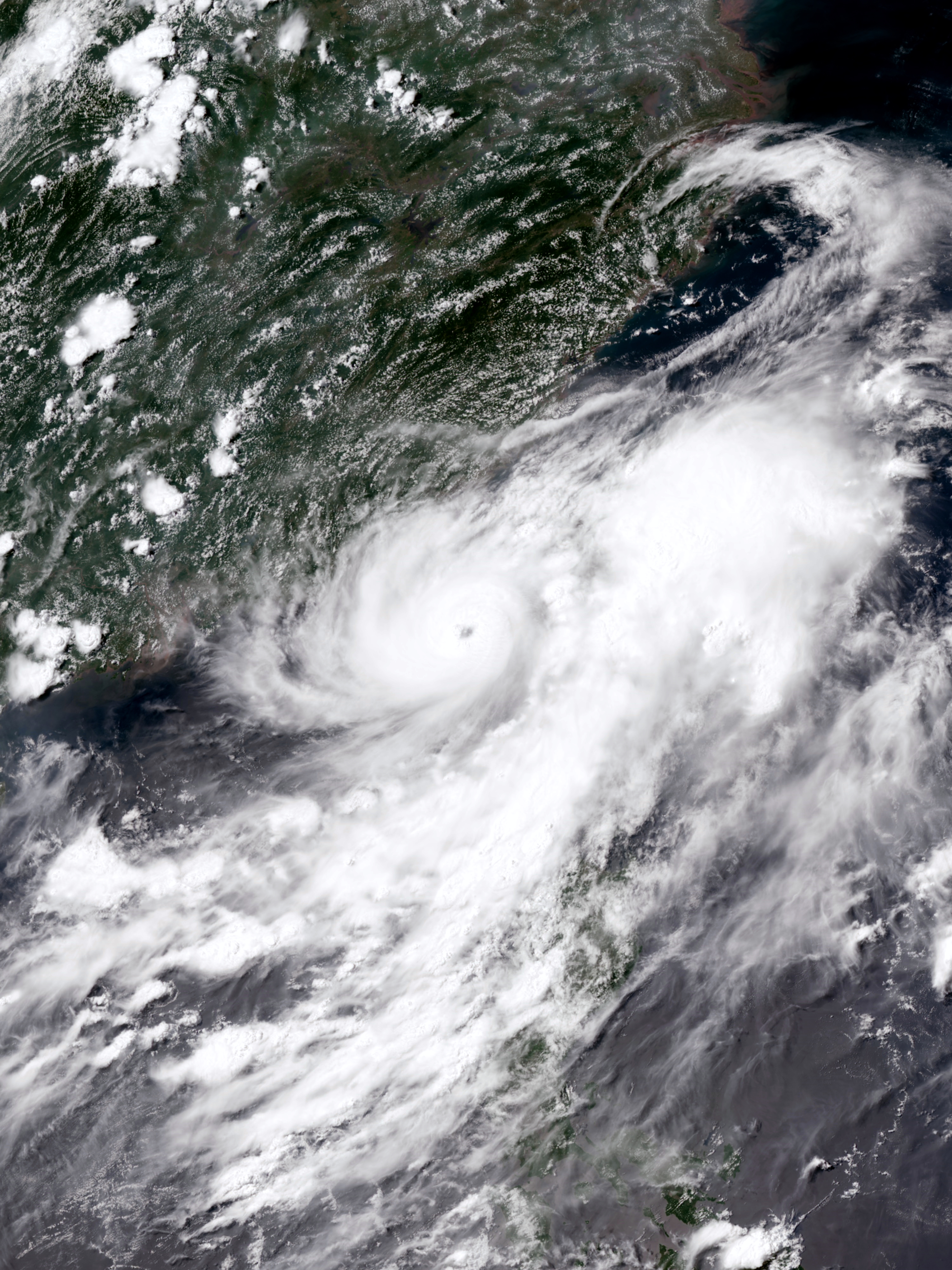
- Danas approaching Chiayi County, Taiwan at near peak intensity early on July 6

Meteorological history
- Formed: July 3, 2025
- Remnant low: July 9, 2025
- Dissipated: July 11, 2025

Typhoon
- 10-minute sustained (JMA)
- Highest winds: 140 km/h (85 mph)
- Lowest pressure: 965 hPa (mbar); 28.50 inHg

Category 4-equivalent typhoon
- 1-minute sustained (SSHWS/JTWC)
- Highest winds: 215 km/h (130 mph)
- Lowest pressure: 938 hPa (mbar); 27.70 inHg

Overall effects
- Fatalities: 10
- Injuries: 727
- Missing: 1
- Damage: >$243 million (2025 USD)
- Areas affected: Philippines, Taiwan, Ryukyu Islands, South China, East China, Hong Kong, Macau
- IBTrACS
- Part of the 2025 Pacific typhoon season

Typhoon Danas, (Note: The name Danas (Tagalog: danas, [ˈdaː.nɐs]) was contributed by the Philippines and means "living, experiencing through an event" in Tagalog.) known in the Philippines as Typhoon Bising, was a strong and erratic tropical cyclone which impacted the Philippines, Taiwan and East China in early July 2025. The fourth named storm and first typhoon of the 2025 Pacific typhoon season, Danas originated from a disturbance about 550 km (340 mi) east-southeast of Hong Kong on July 4. The Joint Typhoon Warning Center (JTWC) (Note: The Joint Typhoon Warning Center (JTWC) is a joint United States Navy – United States Air Force task force that issues tropical cyclone warnings for the western Pacific Ocean and other regions.) subsequently classified the system as a tropical depression and designated it 05W, while the Philippine Atmospheric, Geophysical and Astronomical Services Administration (PAGASA) assigned the name Bising. Later that day, the JTWC upgraded the system to a tropical storm as it began developing a central dense overcast (CDO) and the Japan Meteorological Agency (JMA) (Note: The Japan Meteorological Agency (JMA) is the official Regional Specialized Meteorological Centre (RSMC) for the western Pacific Ocean.) named it Danas. On July 5, the JMA further upgraded the storm into a severe tropical storm as it intensified under favorable conditions.

The JMA designated Danas a typhoon just hours before it made landfall at peak intensity in Chiayi County, Taiwan on July 6. It became the first typhoon to strike Taiwan's central‌‌ western coast since Typhoon Wayne in 1986, the first on record to have its landfall in Chiayi County as a typhoon, and the 2025 season became the second in succession to feature a typhoon impacting Taiwan's western plains after Typhoon Krathon in the previous year. Rainfall warnings were issued for the entirety of Taiwan while the Republic of China Army deployed troops; transportation was disrupted in a major level. Warnings were also issued for Hong Kong, China, Thailand, and the Philippines.

In the Philippines, a child died in Las Piñas, 13,006 people were affected throughout the country, and one house was destroyed among 12 damaged houses. In Taiwan, eight deaths were caused due to car accidents, strong wind, and power outages. One fisherman was declared missing due to the storm. 726 people were injured across Taiwan and 880,000 households across Taiwan experienced power outages. The final damage toll from the storm in Taiwan amounted to NT$3.28 billion (US$113 million). A construction worker was killed on an artificial island to the northeast of Chek Lap Kok, Hong Kong.

== Meteorological history ==
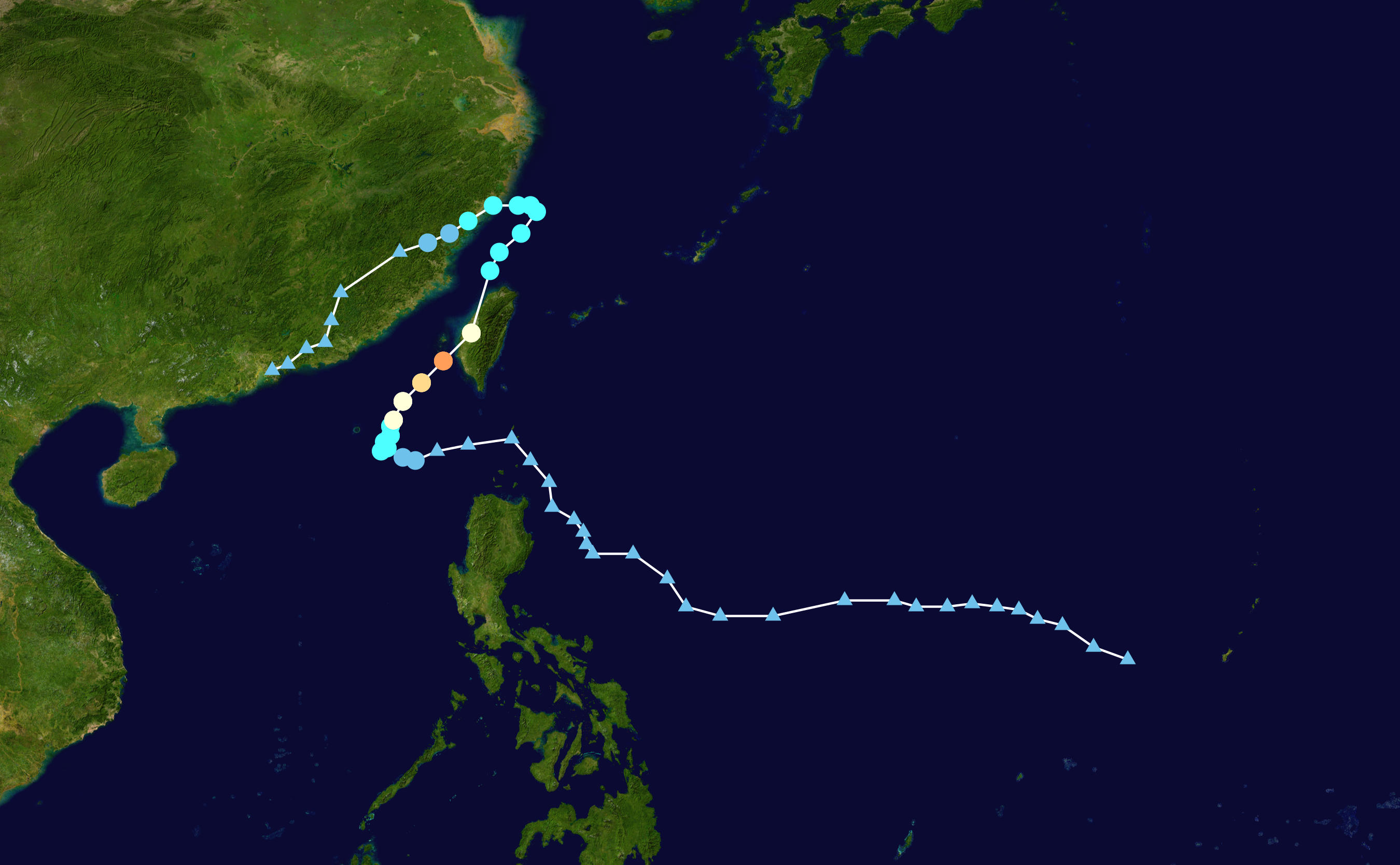
Map plotting the storm's track and intensity, according to the Saffir–Simpson scale Map key Saffir–Simpson scale Tropical depression (≤38 mph, ≤62 km/h) Tropical storm (39–73 mph, 63–118 km/h) Category 1 (74–95 mph, 119–153 km/h) Category 2 (96–110 mph, 154–177 km/h) Category 3 (111–129 mph, 178–208 km/h) Category 4 (130–156 mph, 209–251 km/h) Category 5 (≥157 mph, ≥252 km/h) Unknown Storm type Tropical cyclone Subtropical cyclone Extratropical cyclone, remnant low, tropical disturbance, or monsoon depression

The origins of Danas can be traced back to June 30, when the JTWC identified an area of atmospheric convection about 300 km (160 nmi; 180 mi) east-southeast of Aparri, Cagayan, Philippines. The agency noted that the system was situated in a favorable environment, with limited upper-level outflow, with an upper-level anticyclone positioned just west of the low-level circulation. On July 3, at 04:02 UTC (12:02 HKT), the Hong Kong Observatory (HKO) stated that the low-pressure area, which was to the north of Luzon, was likely to develop into a tropical cyclone gradually in the following days. An hour later, the Meteorological and Geophysical Bureau (SMG) of Macau issued a similar assessment, noting that the system could strengthen while moving through the South China Sea.

At 04:02 UTC on July 3, the Hong Kong Observatory (HKO) said an area of low pressure to the north of Luzon would develop into a tropical cyclone gradually in the next couple of days. At 05:00 UTC, the Meteorological and Geophysical Bureau (SMG) of Macau likewise said that a low pressure area north of Luzon could develop and travel through the South China Sea.

By 12:00 UTC that day, the JMA reported that the system had developed into a low-pressure area, with satellite imagery showing an exposed low-level circulation and convection displaced to the southwest quadrant. At 18:00 UTC, the JMA upgraded the system to a tropical depression. Early on July 4, convective activity associated with the depression, which had moved to a position 550 km (340 mi) east-southeast of Hong Kong, rapidly consolidated. The JTWC subsequently designated the system as Tropical Depression 05W, while the PAGASA attained the name Bising, as it was inside the Philippine Area of Responsibility (PAR). Later that day, the JTWC upgraded the depression to a tropical storm as a CDO began to develop with the JMA accordingly naming the system Danas. At 18:00 UTC on July 5, the JMA further upgraded Danas to a severe tropical storm. On July 6 at 12:00 UTC, it was classified as a typhoon as it intensified while tracking northeastward.

Satellite imagery of Typhoon Danas making landfall in Budai, Chiayi County, Taiwan on July 6 before weakening.

Danas made landfall at peak intensity near Budai, Chiayi County, Taiwan at 23:40 TST (15:40 UTC) on July 6, with 10-minute maximum sustained winds of 120 km/h (75 mph), becoming the first typhoon to strike the island's central‌ western coast since Typhoon Wayne in 1986. It was also the first storm on record to make landfall in Chiayi County at typhoon strength. After crossing Taiwan, the typhoon moved westward across the Taiwan Strait and made two landfalls along the coast of Zhejiang Province, China on July 8: the first in Dongtou District, Wenzhou at 21:25 CST, followed by another one in Rui'an at 23:45 CST. It then tracked west-southwestward inland and dissipated the next day. The HKO reported that by 15:00 UTC on July 9, Danas had weakened to a low-pressure area with winds of 40 km/h (22 kn; 25 mph).

== Preparations ==
=== Taiwan and China ===
On July 6, at 14:30 local time, Taiwan's Central Weather Administration (CWA) issued a warning for winds exceeding 160 km/h (86 kn; 99 mph) as Danas was forecast to make landfall later that day. Rainfall warnings were also issued for the entire island, including the Pescadores, with peak totals expected in Pingtung County (≥500 mm (20 in)), and Taitung County and Kaohsiung (350–499 mm (13.8–19.6 in)). The Agriculture and Food Agency reported that consumer concerns over supply disruptions caused retail vegetable prices to double. The Republic of China Army of Taiwan elevated its emergency response level, deploying troops and equipment to likely affected areas, and stationing liaison as well as intelligence officers with local governments. Transportation was also disrupted, with 258 domestic flights—primarily from Mandarin Airlines and Uni Air—canceled, alongside reductions in railway services.

The China Meteorological Administration renewed a yellow alert as Danas was forecast to bring strong winds and heavy rain to the southern areas of the country. The typhoon was expected to enter the East China Sea on July 7 and approach coastal areas from northern Fujian and central-to-southern Zhejiang. In anticipation, at least 193 passenger ferry services along Fujian's coast and all 104 water construction projects in the province were suspended.

=== Elsewhere ===
The Hong Kong Observatory (HKO) issued Standby Signal No.1 on July 4 due to close proximity to Hong Kong. The HKO eventually lifted the warning two days later as Danas moved away from the territory into the Taiwan Strait. The same signal was similarly issued on July 5 and was lifted in Macau the next day by the Meteorological and Geophysical Bureau (SMG). The Thai Meteorological Department also warned that the system could enhance monsoon rains in Thailand. At 12:00 HKT (04:00 UTC) on July 9, the HKO cautioned that Danas and its remnants would bring torrential rain, squally thunderstorms, and a strengthening southwest monsoon on July 10 to 11. Successive amber and red rainstorm signals were issued during the night of July 9, and reissued the following morning. As a result, classes were suspended on the afternoon of July 10 and continued into July 11. Shortly after Danas (known locally as Bising) developed, the PAGASA issued Tropical Cyclone Wind Signal No. 1 for parts of northern Luzon before lifting it once the system exited the PAR later that day. As the storm recurved towards the PAR, the PAGASA again hoisted Signal No. 1 over Batanes on July 6.

== Impact ==
=== Taiwan ===
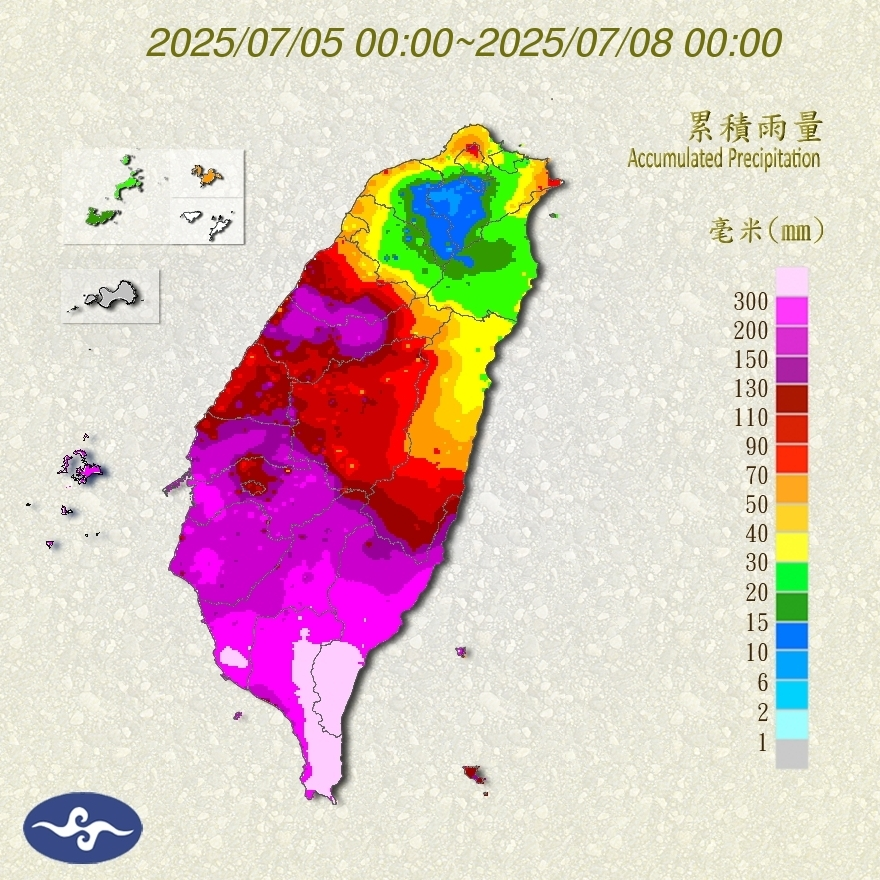
Accumulated rainfall in Taiwan from Typhoon Danas.

By 03:30 TST on July 7, Mudan, Pingtung County recorded up to 457 mm (18.0 in) of rainfall. Heavy precipitation caused the Gangkou River and several dikes in the county to overflow, triggering landslides and flooding roads, farmland, and one bridge. On July 6, strong winds caused by the typhoon contributed to a car accident along National Freeway 3 in Tainan that killed the driver. The following day, another person was killed in Nanxi District after a tree fell onto his car, while an elderly man died after his medical ventilator failed due to a power outage. Additional fatalities included a car accident that killed one person and injured two others in Budai, Chiayi; a fisherman reported missing in Nan'ao, Yilan; and a woman killed by a falling metal gate in Syuejia District. In Cigu District, six days after Dana's landfall, power outages still occurred in some areas, and one woman was killed after accidentally setting her house on fire while using candles during the prolonged blackout. Two people in Liujia and Jiali districts died as they attempted to repair typhoon damage to their homes.

At least 726 people were injured across Taiwan. A total of 9,391 disaster-related incidents were reported across Tainan and in neighboring Chiayi County and Chiayi City. Additionally, approximately 880,000 households across Taiwan experienced power outages during the passage of the storm. In the North District of Tainan, strong winds caused structural damage to a building. In response to the typhoon, authorities in Chiayi County, Chiayi City, Tainan, Kaohsiung, Pingtung, and Penghu announced the suspension of all classes and work from July 6 to 7.

Additional regions, including Taichung, Changhua, Nantou, and Yunlin, implemented similar suspensions starting from 18:00 TST (10:00 UTC) on July 6 to 7. In northern Taiwan, Hsinchu County, Hsinchu City, Miaoli, and four coastal districts of Taoyuan, mainly Luzhu; Dayuan; Xinwu; and Guanyin, also suspended classes and work on July 7. As of July 12, the total estimated loss in agricultural production and damage to private facilities amounted to NT$3.28 billion (US$113 million).

=== Elsewhere ===
Two people were temporarily trapped on a gondola lift on the façade of Kimpton Hong Kong hotel in the Tsim Sha Tsui area of Kowloon in Hong Kong amidst strong gusts. Danas brought extreme heat to the territory, with the very hot weather warning and the amber heat stress warning in place for several days. A similar warning was declared in neighbouring Macau. Flooding was recorded in northern New Territories in the late evening on July 9, with a section of a major expressway closed to traffic as a result. Gusts tore down bamboo scaffolding in Kowloon. A construction worker was killed on an artificial island to the northeast of Chek Lap Kok, while another worker was injured. Danas and its remnant also affected parts of China, economic loss reached 930 million yuan (US$130 million). Heavy rains from Danas and the southwest monsoon affected 13,006 people across 14 barangays throughout the country, destroying one house and damaging 12 others, according to the National Disaster Risk Reduction and Management Council (NDRRMC). Twenty-three areas in Central Luzon reported flooding. At least 219 cities and municipalities suspended classes, while 36 suspended work. A child in Las Piñas died after being swept away by floodwaters.

== See also ==
- Weather of 2025
- Tropical cyclones in 2025

Other similar typhoons:

- Typhoon Thelma (1977) – had a similar track to Danas.
- Typhoon Wayne (1986) – a very long-lived typhoon that, like Danas, made landfall on the western side of Taiwan.
- Typhoon Nepartak (2016) – a much stronger typhoon that brushed Taiwan.
- Typhoon Chanthu (2021) – a rapidly-intensifying Category 5-equivalent typhoon that had a similar trajectory to Danas.
- Typhoon Koinu (2023) – a strong typhoon that also affected South Taiwan.
- Typhoon Krathon (2024) – a strong typhoon that also made landfall in Taiwan's western plains less than a year before Danas.
- Typhoon Gaemi (2024) – a strong typhoon that struck Taiwan approximately one year before Danas.
