= Huang Chao-chin (minister) =

Taiwanese politician (born 1968)

Huang Chao-chin (Chinese: 黃昭欽; born 1968) is a Taiwanese politician.

== Early life and education ==
Huang was born in 1968 and earned a bachelor's degree and a master's degree, both in fisheries science, from National Taiwan Ocean University.

== Public service career ==
Huang chaired the Taiwan Tuna Association, and by October 2017 had been named head of the Kaohsiung District Fishermen's Association.

At the time of his appointment as deputy minister of the Ministry of Agriculture in May 2024, he was still affiliated with the Kaohsiung District Fishermen's Association. In his role as deputy minister, Huang commented on the implementation of betel nut regulations, served as deputy director of the Central Disaster Response Center after Typhoon Krathon struck Taiwan, and signed a memorandum of understanding with Shigemitsu Industry Company, permitting ten Taiwanese agricultural products to enter the Japanese market.
