= Typhoon Mitag (2019) =

Pacific typhoon in 2019

Typhoon Mitag (Onyok)
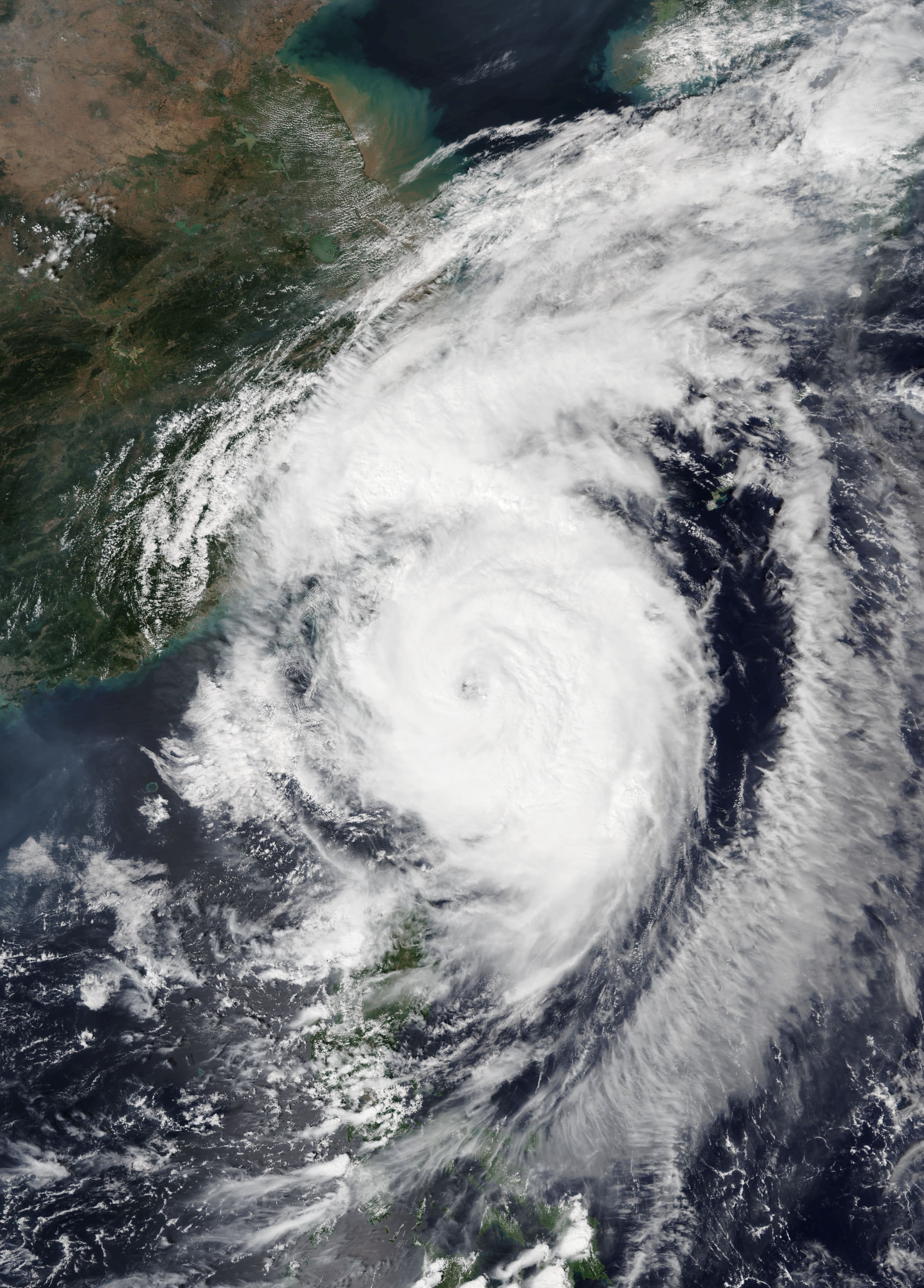
- Typhoon Mitag (Onyok) near peak intensity brushing Taiwan on September 30

Meteorological history
- Formed: September 27, 2019
- Extratropical: October 3, 2019
- Dissipated: October 5, 2019

Typhoon
- 10-minute sustained (JMA)
- Highest winds: 140 km/h (85 mph)
- Lowest pressure: 965 hPa (mbar); 28.50 inHg

Category 2-equivalent typhoon
- 1-minute sustained (SSHWS)
- Highest winds: 165 km/h (105 mph)
- Lowest pressure: 961 hPa (mbar); 28.38 inHg

Overall effects
- Fatalities: 22
- Damage: $816 million (2019 USD)
- Areas affected: Philippines, Ryukyu Islands, Taiwan, East China (particularly Zhoushan), South Korea
- IBTrACS
- Part of the 2019 Pacific typhoon season

Typhoon Mitag, (Note: The name Mitag (Yapese: Mitaeg, [mitaːɣ]) was contributed by the Federated States of Micronesia and is a feminine given names meaning "my eyes" in Yapese.) known in the Philippines as Typhoon Onyok, was a moderately strong tropical cyclone that severely affected Taiwan, East China and South Korea in early October 2019. The 23rd depression and the 8th typhoon of the 2019 Pacific typhoon season, Mitag developed from a low pressure system near the Micronesia Islands on September 24. Tracking generally northwestward, the system gradually organised and the Japanese Meteorological Agency issued its first advisory on Tropical Depression 19W on September 27. It continued northeastward, gradually organizing and becoming less broad. It was then upgraded to Tropical Storm Mitag on September 28. The storm quickly intensified, becoming a Category 1 typhoon just a day later. It further intensified into a Category 2 typhoon, passing very close to Taiwan. It weakened thereafter, making landfall near Zhoushan in East China on October 1 before weakening back to a poorly organized tropical storm. It later made landfall in South Korea on October 2 before becoming extratropical in the Japan Sea on October 3.

== Meteorological history ==
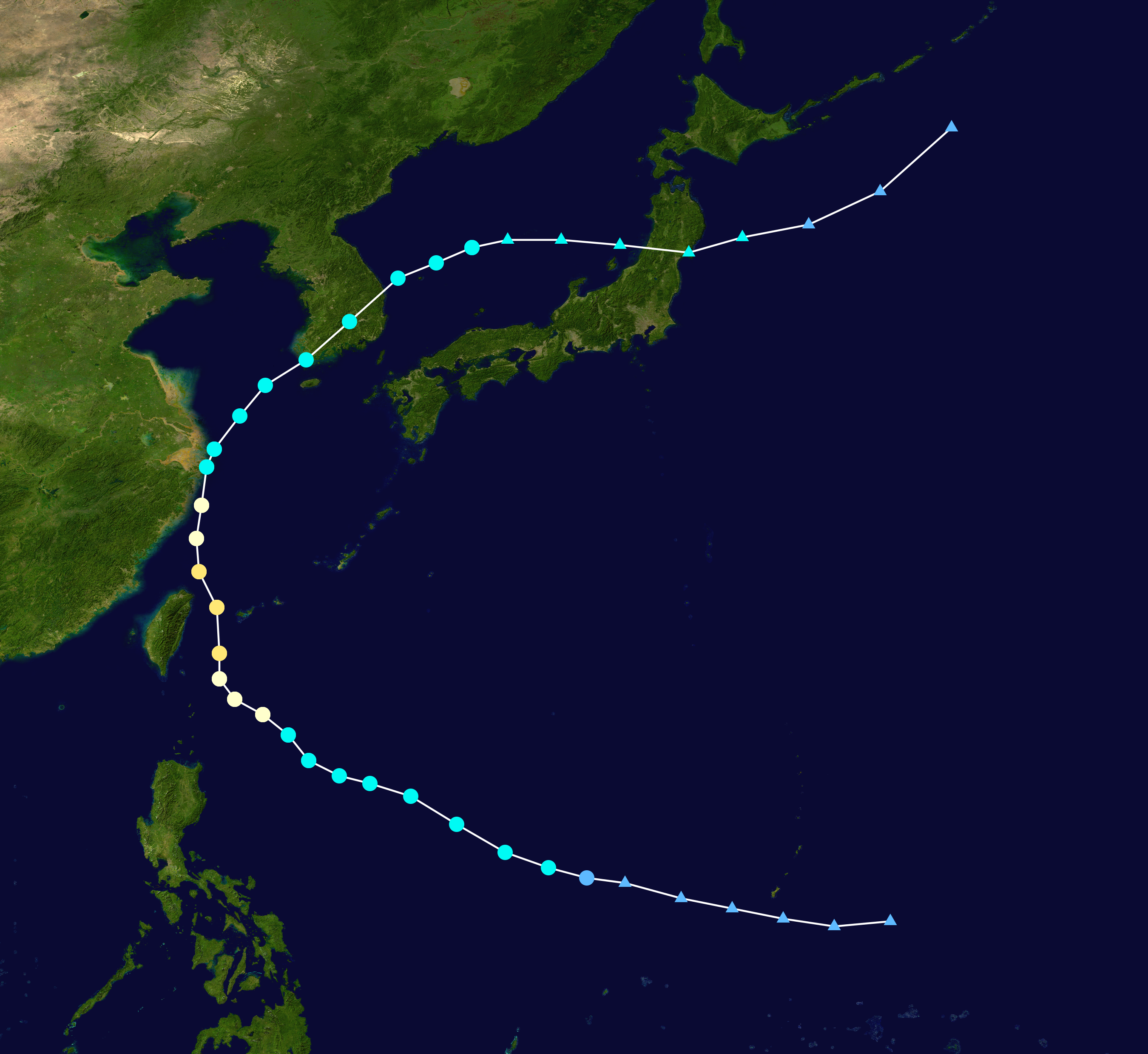
Map plotting the storm's track and intensity, according to the Saffir–Simpson scale Map key Saffir–Simpson scale Tropical depression (≤38 mph, ≤62 km/h) Tropical storm (39–73 mph, 63–118 km/h) Category 1 (74–95 mph, 119–153 km/h) Category 2 (96–110 mph, 154–177 km/h) Category 3 (111–129 mph, 178–208 km/h) Category 4 (130–156 mph, 209–251 km/h) Category 5 (≥157 mph, ≥252 km/h) Unknown Storm type Tropical cyclone Subtropical cyclone Extratropical cyclone, remnant low, tropical disturbance, or monsoon depression

Mitag developed from a low pressure system near the Micronesia Islands on September 24. Tracking generally northwestward, the system gradually organised and the Japanese Meteorological Agency issued its first advisory on Tropical Depression 19W on September 27. Traipsing toward the Philippines and eventually entering the Philippine Area of Responsibility the next day with the Philippine Atmospherical, Geological and Astronomical Services Administration routinely named it Onyok. The JMA followed suit after the system intensified to become a tropical storm, naming it Mitag on September 28. The JTWC's projected track path lead Mitag toward the Ryukyu Islands, all while strengthening. Mitag, while gaining latitude, strengthened quickly on September 29 and within just hours became a severe tropical storm, and shortly after, a category 1 typhoon later on that same day.

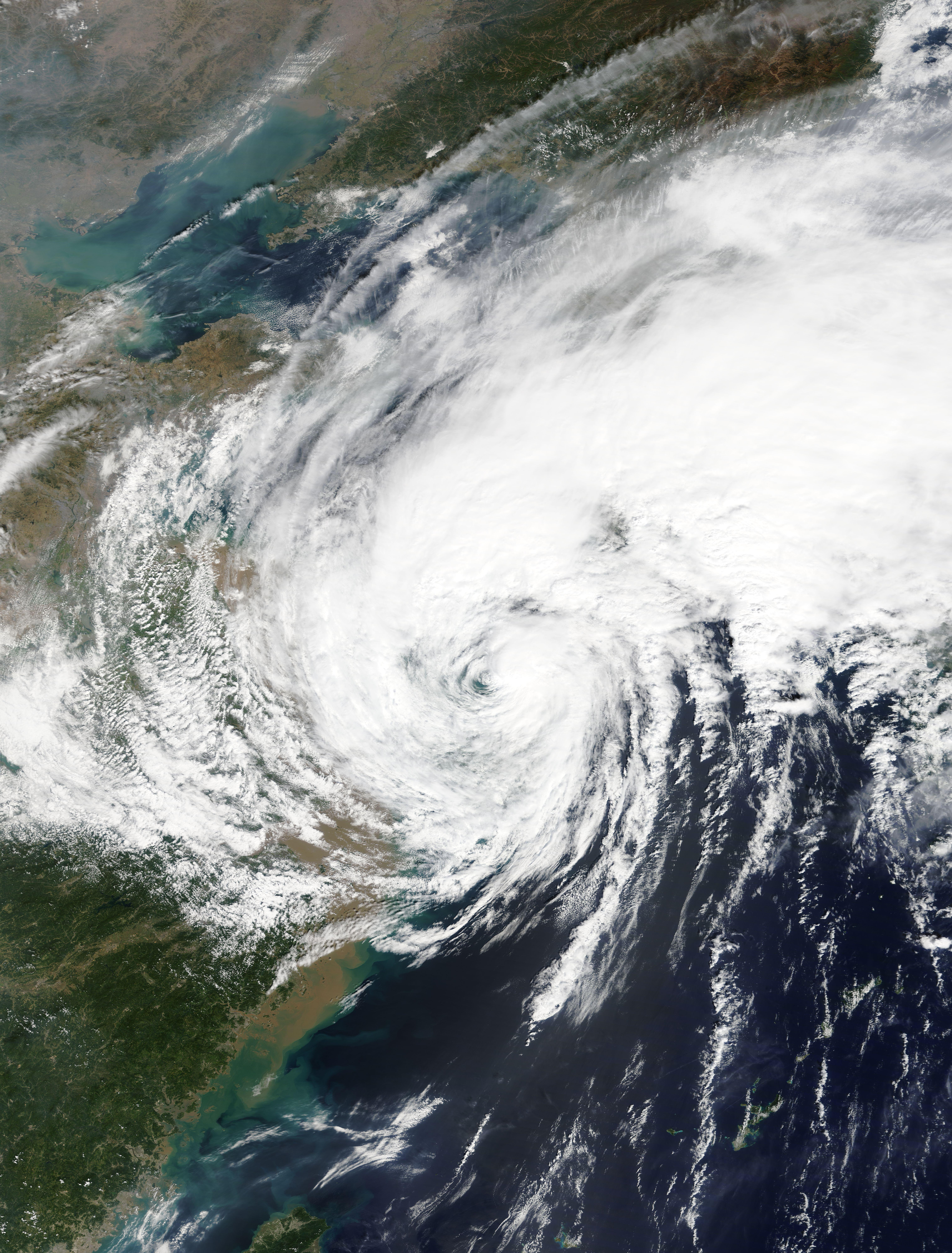
Tropical Storm Mitag approaching the Korean Peninsula on October 2

Developing a visible circulation and with thick bands of strong convection, it swiftly became a category 2 typhoon on the evening of September 30, with a small, clouded eye developing as it passed just east of Taiwan. Due to a sudden increase in wind shear and decrease in sea surface temperatures, Mitag began to quickly degrade after becoming a category 2 typhoon, and weakened to a category 1 typhoon before making its first mainland landfall on Zhoushan, exiting the Philippine Area of Responsibility. The land interaction disrupted Mitag by quite some margin, and it weakened to a tropical storm relatively quickly during landfall. It quickly moved northeast towards South Korea as it began to enter its extratropical transition on the evening of October 1. Mitag made its second landfall on South Korea on October 2 whilst surprisingly holding onto tropical storm strength and remaining a poorly organized tropical cyclone. Shortly after land interaction with South Korea, its low-level circulation center was continually exposed by westerly wind shear and its cloud tops became displaced, leading to it weakening below tropical depression status on October 3 and becoming extratropical the next day.

== Preparations and Impact ==
=== The Philippines ===
As Mitag was initially forecast to come near the Philippines, a Signal 1 warning was raised for a portion of Luzon and the Batanes and the Babuyan Islands as the storm passed just northeast of the country as a category 1 typhoon. The PAGASA also noted that in its path it would bring showers and isolated thunderstorms over the Cagayan Valley in its passing, and rough sea conditions as well. As forecast, the storm's outer bands produced heavy rainfall, rough sea conditions, and gusty winds in Northern Luzon, but no damage was reported.

=== Taiwan ===
As Mitag approached Taiwan from the southeast, an Orange Tropical Cyclone Alert was raised for Taiwan on September 29, the second-highest possible. On the same day, the Taiwanese government ordered a total closure of all financial markets and schools in the country as Mitag advanced towards Taiwan, while airlines in the country also cancelled dozens of flights amid warnings of floods and high winds issued by the country's meteorological agency.

=== South Korea ===
Mitag brought 150-250 millimeters of rain to southernmost of Jeju. Flood and damage have been reported on the eastern part of Jeju. Over 300 flights were cancelled and more than 300 schools suspended classes or shortened hours.

== See also ==
- Weather of 2019
- Tropical cyclones in 2019
