= Typhoon Krathon =

Pacific typhoon in 2024

Typhoon Krathon (Julian)
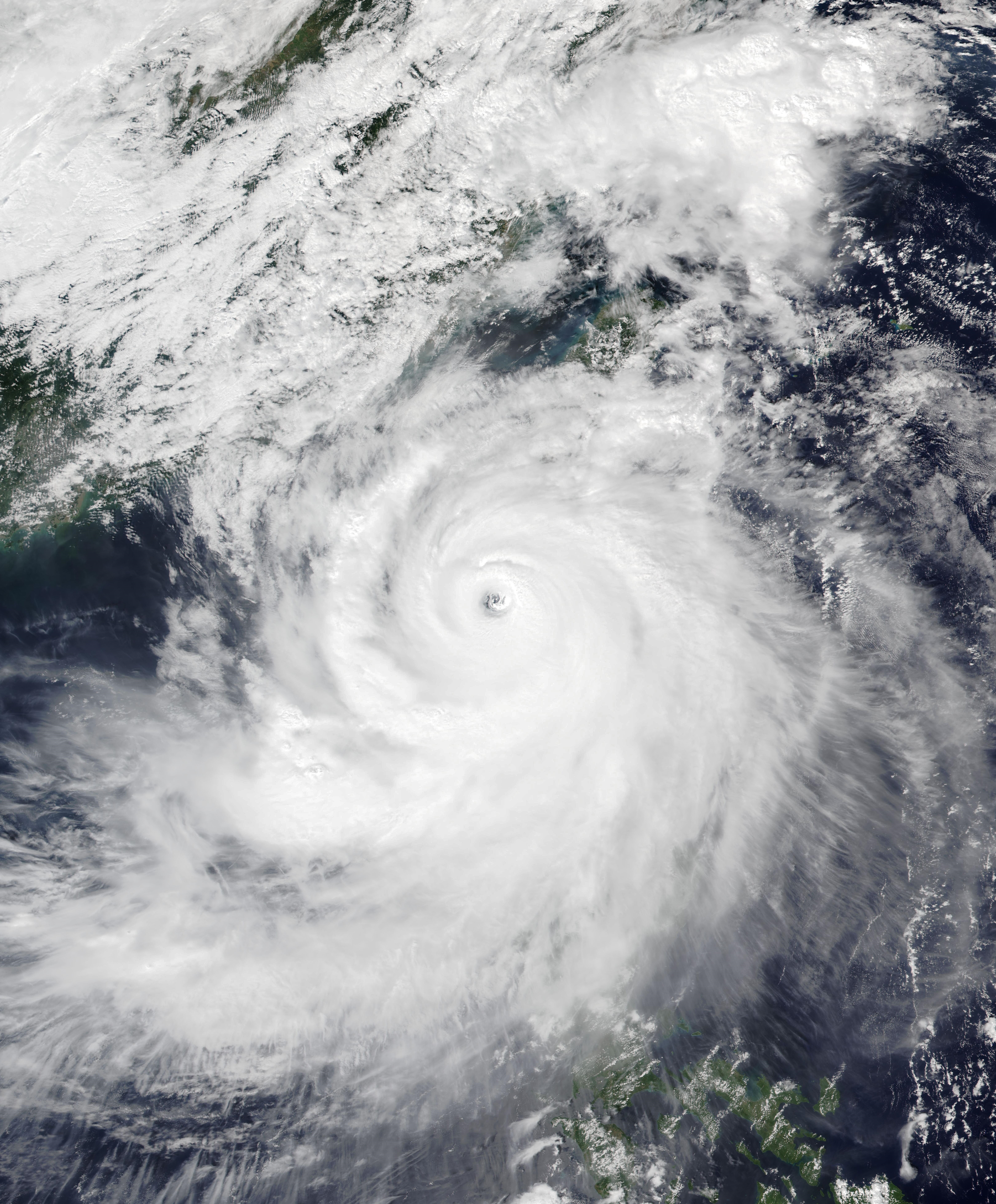
- Krathon at its peak intensity while entering the South China Sea on October 1

Meteorological history
- Formed: September 26, 2024
- Dissipated: October 3, 2024

Violent typhoon
- 10-minute sustained (JMA)
- Highest winds: 195 km/h (120 mph)
- Lowest pressure: 920 hPa (mbar); 27.17 inHg

Category 4-equivalent super typhoon
- 1-minute sustained (SSHWS/JTWC)
- Highest winds: 250 km/h (155 mph)
- Lowest pressure: 922 hPa (mbar); 27.23 inHg

Overall effects
- Fatalities: 18
- Injuries: 731
- Missing: 1
- Damage: >$51.8 million (2024 USD)
- Areas affected: Philippines, Taiwan, Ryukyu Islands
- IBTrACS
- Part of the 2024 Pacific typhoon season

Typhoon Krathon, (Note: The name Krathon (Thai: กระท้อน, [kra˨˩ tʰɔːn˦˥]) was contributed by Thailand and means santol (Sandoricum koetjape) in Thai.) known in the Philippines as Super Typhoon Julian, was a powerful and erratic typhoon which impacted Taiwan and the Philippines in late-September and early-October 2024. Krathon was the first storm to make landfall on Taiwan's densely populated western plains since Typhoon Thelma in 1977. It was also the first storm to hit Kaohsiung in October and the first since Tropical Storm Trami in 2001 to weaken into a tropical depression over Taiwan. Additionally, it was also the strongest typhoon to hit Batanes since Typhoon Chanthu in 2021.

The twenty-sixth tropical depression, eighteenth named storm, second violent typhoon, and second super typhoon of the season, Krathon developed into a tropical depression near Kadena Air Base, Japan, on September 26. It became a tropical storm on September 28 and reached typhoon strength on September 29 after developing a broad, ragged eye. Krathon moved north-northwestward before shifting west-northwestward and passing near Sabtang, Batanes. On October 1, it reached peak intensity with ten-minute sustained winds of 195 km/h (120 mph) and a central pressure of 920 hPa (27.17 inHg), making it a Category 4-equivalent super typhoon on the Saffir-Simpson scale. After entering the northern South China Sea, an eyewall replacement cycle weakened the storm. Krathon made landfall near Siaogang District in Kaohsiung, Taiwan, on October 3, then rapidly weakened while moving through central Taiwan, near the western edge of the Central Mountain Range. The JMA monitored the system over the South China Sea before it dissipated later that day.

Ahead of the storm, a Tropical Cyclone Wind Signal was issued for various areas in the Philippines, with a red alert for Calayan and Santa Ana in Cagayan. Krathon resulted in at least five deaths, three people missing, and eight injured in the Philippines. Additionally, it was the wettest tropical cyclone in Basco, Batanes, bringing more than two months' worth of September rainfall and surpassing the previous record set by Typhoon Ruth in 1991. Meanwhile, Taiwan's Central Weather Administration issued maritime warnings for the Bashi Channel, leading to the evacuation of more than 11,000 people and the mobilization of nearly 40,000 soldiers for rescue efforts; at least 13 people were killed across the island, including nine from the Antai Tian-Sheng Memorial Hospital fire in Pingtung County. Overall, 18 people were killed, 731 were injured and one was missing by Krathon, leaving at least US$48.1 million in damages.

== Meteorological history ==
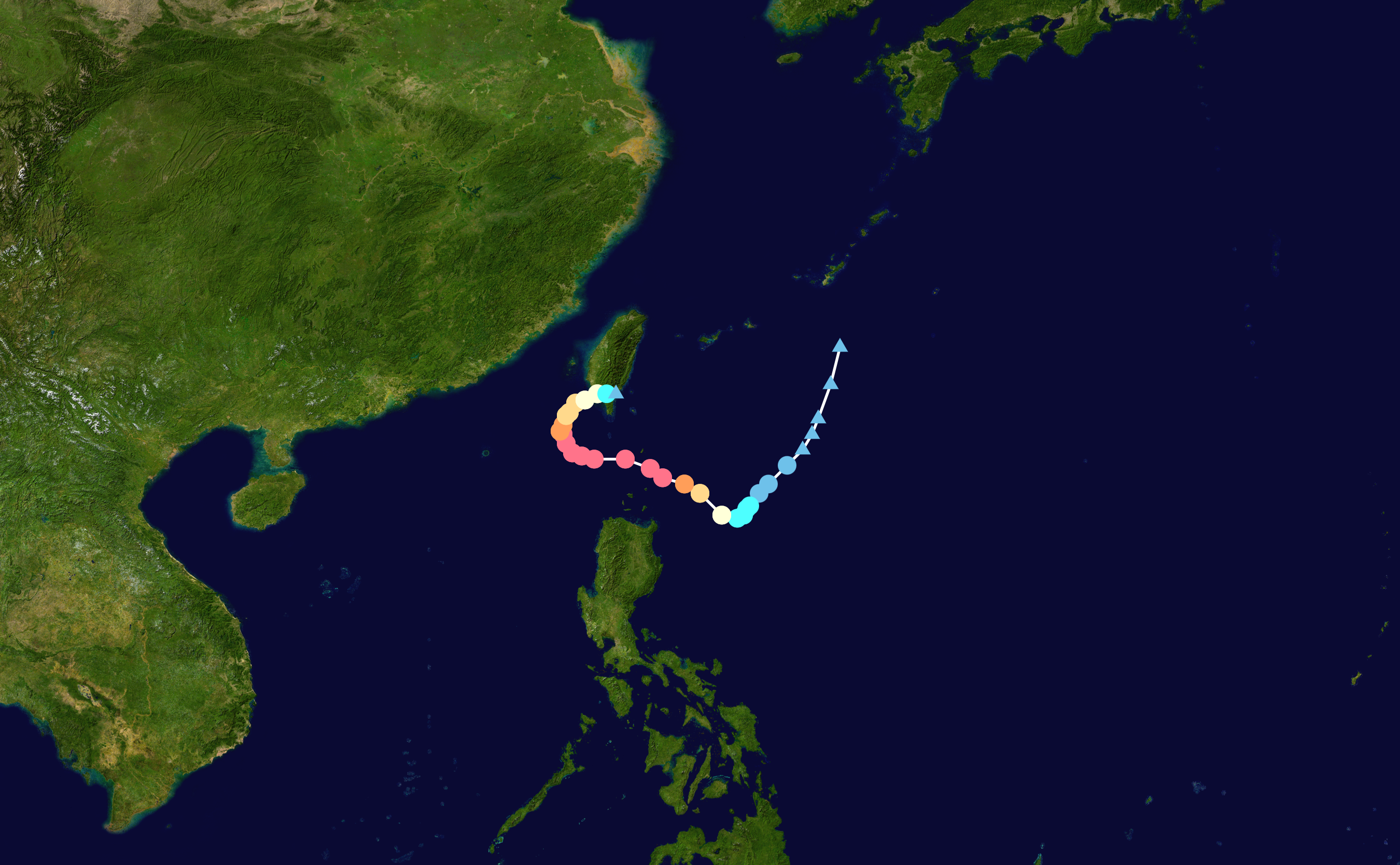
Map plotting the storm's track and intensity, according to the Saffir–Simpson scale Map key Saffir–Simpson scale Tropical depression (≤38 mph, ≤62 km/h) Tropical storm (39–73 mph, 63–118 km/h) Category 1 (74–95 mph, 119–153 km/h) Category 2 (96–110 mph, 154–177 km/h) Category 3 (111–129 mph, 178–208 km/h) Category 4 (130–156 mph, 209–251 km/h) Category 5 (≥157 mph, ≥252 km/h) Unknown Storm type Tropical cyclone Subtropical cyclone Extratropical cyclone, remnant low, tropical disturbance, or monsoon depression

The origins of Typhoon Krathon can be traced back to September 26, when the Japan Meteorological Agency (JMA) reported a tropical depression 250 km (155 mi) south-southwest of Kadena Air Base, Japan, characterised by a partially exposed low-level circulation centre with persistent deep convection in the southern semicircle and formative banding to the north. The United States Joint Typhoon Warning Center (JTWC) issued a tropical cyclone formation alert on September 27, noting that convective banding was wrapping into the centre and that the environmental analysis indicated a favourable environment for development due to low vertical wind shear, good equatorward outflow aloft, and warm sea surface temperatures of 29–30 °C (84–86 °F). On that same day, the Philippine Atmospheric, Geophysical and Astronomical Services Administration (PAGASA) announced that the system had developed into a tropical depression named Julian, as it formed within the Philippine Area of Responsibility; the depression was moving slowly south-southwestward due to weak steering flow.

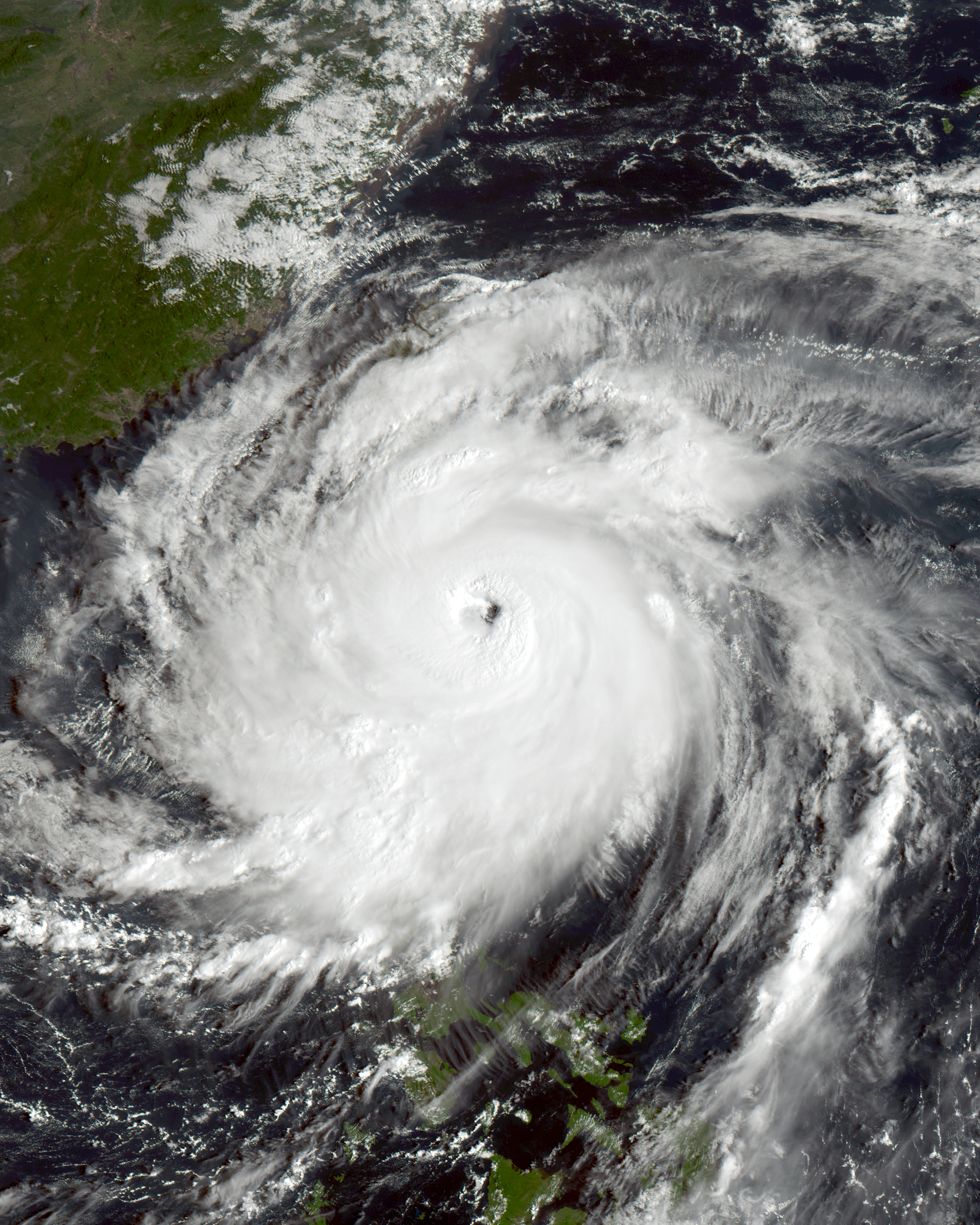
Krathon off the northeastern coast of Luzon on September 30

At 09:00 UTC, the JTWC upgraded the tropical depression, designating the system as 20W, noting an obscured low-level circulation centre that was assumed to be in the centre of rotating bands of convection organising into vortical hot towers. Satellite imagery indicated that the storm was steadily consolidating, with spiral bands of deep convection extending across three quadrants of the system and encircling the low-level circulation centre. On September 28, the depression intensified into a tropical storm named Krathon by the JMA, fueled by low vertical wind shear, warm sea surface temperatures, and high ocean heat content, while moving southwestward along the southeastern periphery of a mid-level subtropical high; however, Krathon slowed down over the last six hours and was located within a col region between two deep-layer subtropical highs, with satellite imagery indicating an improving appearance due to the development of a central dense overcast feature over the circulation centre.

CWA radar imagery of Krathon tracking over the Balintang Channel (passing close to Sabtang, Batanes) before eventually making landfall over the southwestern coast of Taiwan

At around 18:00 UTC, the JMA upgraded the system to a severe tropical storm, utilizing the Dvorak technique to assess its intensity based on satellite imagery. Krathon displayed strong equatorward outflow alongside a weaker polar channel, while the observed cirrus cloud suggested that a more radial outflow was beginning to develop as the system intensified. Early the next day, both the JMA and the JTWC upgraded it to a minimal typhoon after it had opened a broad, raggedly-defined eye, which had since become cloud-filled, and the system was moving north-northwestward between two mid-level subtropical highs. On September 30, Krathon's eye, measuring 23 miles (37 km) in diameter, was visible on infrared satellite imagery, surrounded by warm temperatures of 12–14 °C (54–57 °F), as the storm gradually moved west-northwestward and passed near Sabtang, Batanes. The typhoon displayed a distinct circular shape in the cloud tops across the eyewall region, with a contracting eye that was obscured in the center. At 18:00 UTC, the JTWC reported that the system had peaked as a Category 4-equivalent super typhoon after Krathon attained 1-minute sustained winds of 250 km/h (155 mph). Early on October 1, the JMA upgraded Krathon to a violent typhoon, estimating its peak intensity with a minimum central pressure of 920 hPa (27.17 inHg) and 10-minute maximum sustained winds of 195 km/h (120 mph).

Satellite imagery of Typhoon Krathon throughout its formation from September 26 until its dissipation on October 3

As it moved into the northern area of the South China Sea, the cloud top temperatures of Krathon sharply decreased over the past six hours amid warm conditions. An eyewall replacement cycle became apparent in radar imagery, with the secondary eyewall almost completely encircling the inner eye. Once the eyewall replacement cycle was complete, Krathon began warming cloud tops and displayed a weakened cloud-filled eye feature that caused upwelling and a decrease in ocean heat content, and it was moving southwest of Taiwan, located between a subtropical ridge to the east and another ridge over southern China and northern Vietnam. The following day, satellite imagery revealed that the system remained symmetrical; however, warming cloud tops became exposed due to increasing vertical wind shear. On October 3 at 12:40 p.m. local time, Krathon made landfall near Siaogang District in Kaohsiung, Taiwan, with its spiral bands of deep convection gradually weakening as it moved north-northeastward into central Taiwan, near the western edge of the Central Mountain Range. This made Krathon the first storm to make landfall on Taiwan's densely populated western plains since Typhoon Thelma in 1977. After making landfall, the system rapidly slowed down and deteriorated, exhibiting minimal convective activity and ultimately weakening to a minimal tropical storm. The JTWC discontinued warnings on the system as it moved inland, where the rugged southeastern mountain ranges of Taiwan eroded much of the deep convection associated with the circulation center as it weakened to a tropical depression. The Central Weather Administration noted that Krathon was the first storm to hit Kaohsiung in October, and the first since Tropical Storm Trami in 2001 to weaken into a tropical depression over Taiwan. The JMA continued to monitor the system as it emerged into the South China Sea, where it remained nearly stationary between two mid-level subtropical highs before dissipating on the same day.

== Preparations ==
=== Philippines ===
==== Highest Tropical Cyclone Wind Signal ====
Highest Tropical Cyclone Wind Signal issued by PAGASA for Krathon (Julian) in each province. The white line represents the best track.

Shortly after PAGASA upgraded the storm, Tropical Cyclone Wind Signal No. 1 was issued for Batanes, Cagayan, Isabela, Apayao, Abra, Kalinga, the eastern and central portions of Mountain Province, the eastern portion of Ifugao, Ilocos Norte, the northern portion of Ilocos Sur, the northern portion of Aurora, northern and eastern Nueva Ecija, Pangasinan, La Union, Quirino, Benguet, and the Polillo Islands. As Krathon intensified into a severe tropical storm, Signal No. 2 was raised for the northeastern portion of Cagayan and the eastern portion of the Babuyan Islands. As the storm continued to intensify, PAGASA raised Signal No. 3 for the northeastern portion of the Babuyan Islands On September 29, various local government units announced the suspension of classes on September 30 because of inclement weather caused by the storm, while PAGASA raised Signal No. 4 in Batanes, Babuyan Island, and Calayan Island.

The Commission on Elections ordered an extension of voters' registration for the 2025 Philippine general election, which was due to end on September 30, in areas affected by the storm. Around 1,110 people were evacuated across Cagayan Valley. A red alert warning was declared in the municipalities of Calayan and Santa Ana in Cagayan. The Ambuklao, Binga and Magat Dams opened their gates in anticipation of an increase in water levels due to the storm. According to the NDRRMC, ten people were preemptively evacuated.

=== Taiwan ===
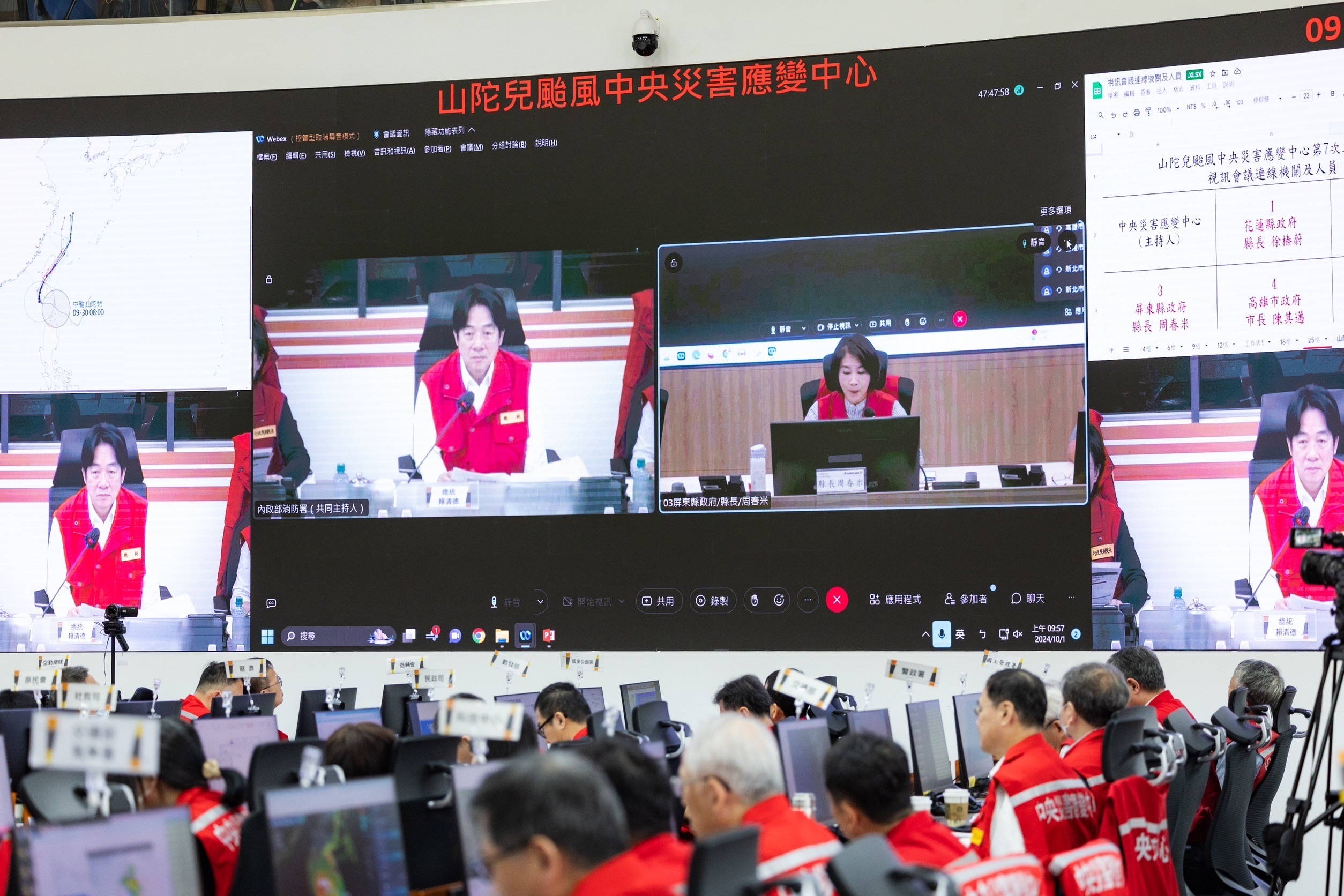
President Lai Ching-te inspected the Central Disaster Response Center and held a video conference with Pingtung County Mayor Chou Chun-mi

The Central Emergency Operation Center advised against traveling to coastal and mountainous areas, while several schools, beaches, national parks and ferry services were closed across the island. All 25 water retention basins in Kaohsiung were emptied in anticipation of the storm. Warnings on shipping were raised by the Central Weather Administration in the Bashi Channel and the Taiwan Strait, followed by a land warning for Typhoon Krathon as the storm approached Taiwan. All schools and government offices in the island were ordered closed on October 2 and 3, while all domestic and at least 250 international flights were cancelled. Around 11,362 people were evacuated, while nearly 40,000 soldiers were mobilized for rescue efforts. Kaohsiung officials urged residents to be vigilant regarding the storm, recalling the devastation caused by Typhoon Thelma in 1977, which severely impacted the city.

== Impact and aftermath ==
=== Philippines ===
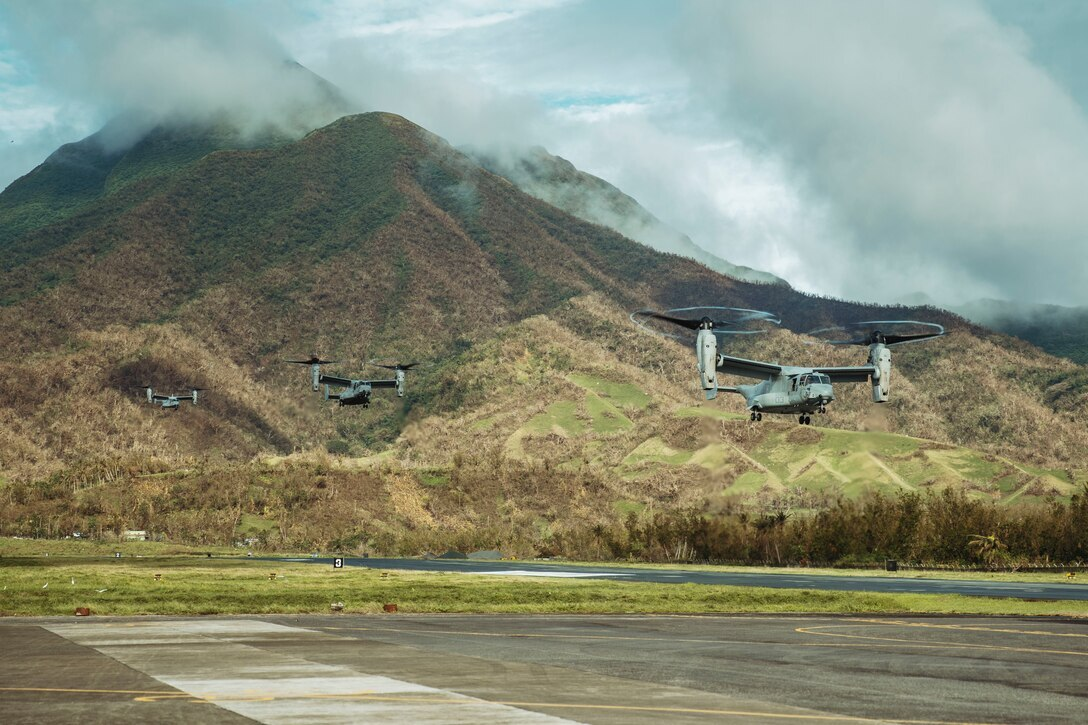
The Bell Boeing V-22 Osprey from the 15th Marine Expeditionary Unit landed at Basco Airport on October 8

Between September 30 and October 1, the PAGASA station in Basco, Batanes recorded 727.8 mm (28.7 inches) of rain, exceeding two months' worth for September and breaking the previous record for the wettest cyclone in the area, which was 616.4 mm (24.3 inches) during Typhoon Ruth (Trining) in 1991. Rain totals in the country were 481.6 mm (19.0 inches) in Laoag, 201.5 mm (7.9 inches) in Calayan, Cagayan, and 120 mm (4.7 inches) in Baguio. At least 26 families were displaced by floods in Abra. Landslides also blocked roads in La Union, Abra, Apayao and Mountain Province. Five airports suspended operations in northern Luzon. Two light aircraft parked at Basco Airport were damaged by strong winds, while Laoag International Airport sustained minor damage. Flooding also affected the runways of Lingayen and Vigan Airports. Operations were also suspended at San Fernando and Baguio Airports due to clouds and low visibility. Seven seaports also suspended operations, while 99 sections of road and three bridges were rendered impassable. Batanes governor Marilou Cayco said that it could take two months for the province to recover from the storm.

Krathon passed directly near Sabtang in Batanes on September 30

The Philippine Charity Sweepstakes Office distributed 3,000 food packs to Ilocos Norte residents impacted by Typhoon Krathon. The United States government, through the US Marines, provided emergency aid and air transport support in response to the devastation caused by Krathon, particularly in Batanes. The United States has deployed personnel and aircraft to the Philippines to aid relief efforts in Batanes following Typhoon Krathon, with two Lockheed Martin KC-130 aircraft from the III Marine Expeditionary Force transporting personnel and equipment to Villamor Air Base in Pasay. The United States government, through USAID, allocated ₱28 million (US$568,527.92) to aid those affected by Krathon in Batanes, while the Department of Defense deployed military assets to assist the Armed Forces of the Philippines and the Office of Civil Defense in delivering humanitarian supplies to the area. The Philippine Air Force mobilized its PZL W-3 Sokół helicopter to provide emergency supplies and personnel as part of the government's continued relief efforts for the typhoon-affected areas in Batanes. Meanwhile, the USS Boxer (LHD-4) and its 15th Marine Expeditionary Unit arrived in the Philippines to support relief efforts following Typhoon Krathon. On October 4, President Bongbong Marcos inspected affected areas in Batanes and Ilocos Norte. 58 areas have been declared in a state of calamity, including Ilocos Norte, Batanes, and Cagayan, due to the severe impact of the storm.

As of October 18, 2024, the National Disaster Risk Reduction and Management Council reported that a total of 380,778 people were affected, with 11 displaced from their homes. Power outages occurred in 20 cities, water outages were reported in three, and telecommunications outages were reported in eight municipalities. A total of 2,843 houses were damaged, while 127 others were destroyed. Five people were killed, twelve were injured, and one was missing. In Batanes, 276 houses were destroyed, while 2,048 others were damaged. Total damages to infrastructure reached ₱965.18 million (US$19.6 million), while agricultural damages amounted to ₱607.38 million (US$12.33 million) affecting 17,344.94 hectares (42,860.3 acres) of crops, resulting in overall damages of ₱1.57 billion (US$31.93 million). The government gave out relief aid worth ₱21.59 million (US$438,340.61) and dispatched a C-130 transport aircraft to deliver aid and evacuate some 200 people stranded in Batanes.

=== Taiwan ===
Wettest tropical cyclones and their remnants in Taiwan Highest-known totals
Precipitation			Storm	Location	Ref.
Rank	mm	in	Storm	Location	Ref.
1	3,060	120.47	Morakot 2009	Alishan, Chiayi	
2	2,319	91.30	Nari 2001	Wulai, New Taipei	
3	2,162	85.12	Flossie 1969	Beitou, Taipei	
4	1,987	78.23	Herb 1996	Alishan, Chiayi	
5	1,933	76.10	Gaemi 2024	Maolin, Kaoshiung	
6	1,774	69.84	Saola 2012	Yilan City	
7	1,725	67.91	Krathon 2024	Beinan, Taitung	
8	1,700	66.93	Lynn 1987	Taipei	
9	1,672	65.83	Clara 1967	Dongshan, Yilan	
10	1,611	63.43	Sinlaku 2008	Heping, Taichung	

The outer rain bands of Krathon triggered mudslides that blocked parts of the Suhua Highway in Hualien County on September 30. A temple was damaged in a mudslide in Rueifang, New Taipei City. At least 12 garbage collection vehicles were damaged in a landslide at the Tianwaitian waste recycling incineration plant in Keelung. The Ju Ming Museum in Jinshan District, New Taipei was flooded, stranding its staff. In Pingtung County, one of the blocks of a hospital caught fire, killing nine people. One person died in Hualien County from a fall while trimming trees while another died in Taitung County after his vehicle crashed into fallen rocks. At least 719 people were injured throughout the island, while two persons went missing in New Taipei City and were later found dead. At least 9,499 disaster-related incidents were reported across the island.

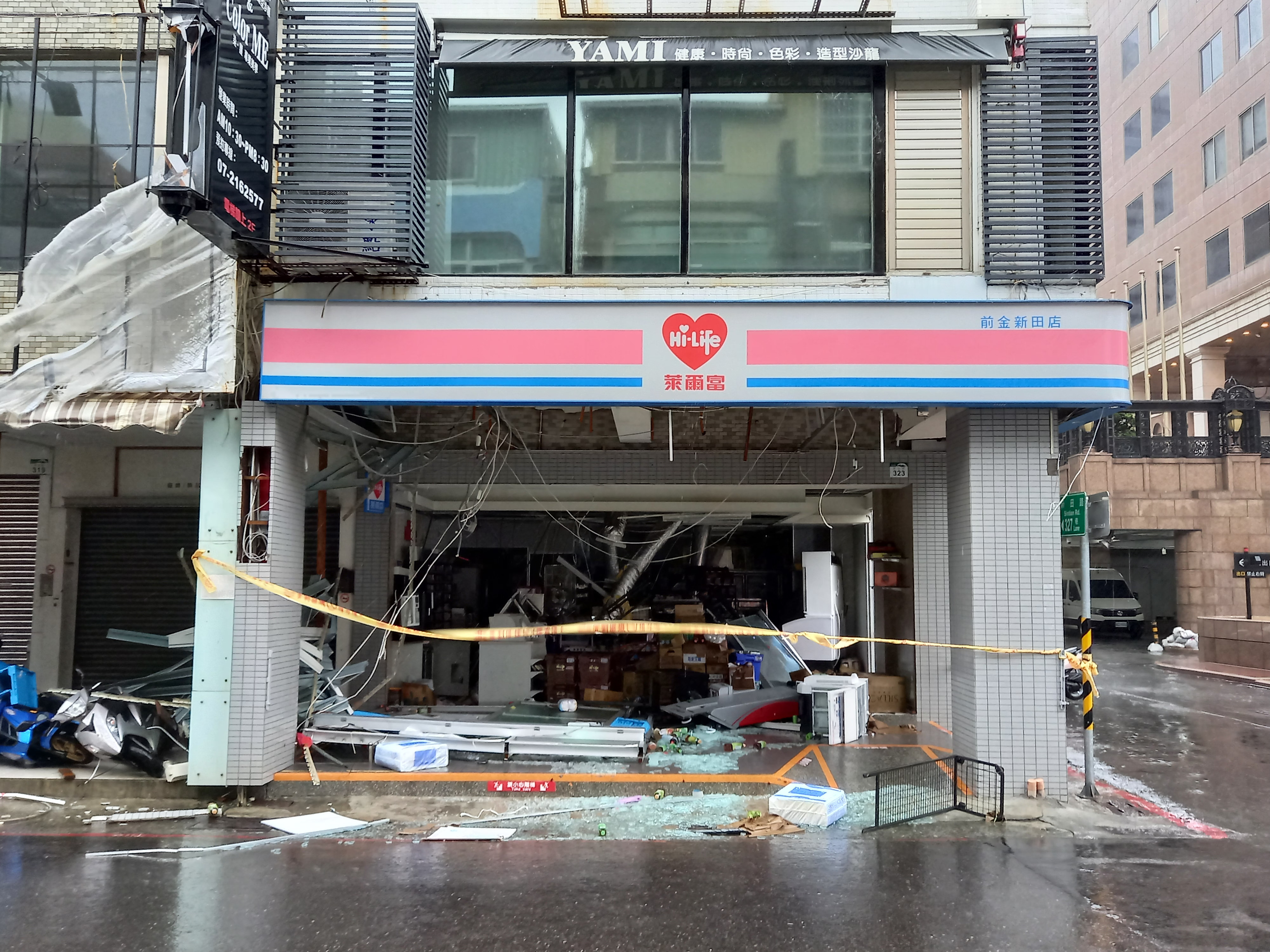
A convenience shop was severely damaged after the onslaught of Krathon

A total of 436,634 households lost electricity while 404,673 households lost access to water. The cargo ship Blue Lagoon sprang a leak in the engine room and was abandoned. Its 19 crew were rescued by Taiwan Coast Guard helicopters around 18 miles (29 km) southwest of Orchid Island, after which the vessel drifted ashore on the island. Damages to agriculture reached NT$644.7 million (US$19.9 million) with Kaohsiung and Pingtung County being the most affected. The government pledged subsidies and loans to affected businesses.

Downed tress over the sidewalk along Zhoushan Road in Kaohsiung after Krathon brushed Taiwan

Typhoons typically strike the east coast, but Krathon was unusual as it hit the west coast, prompting Taiwan's media to describe it as a "weird" storm. At least 124 incidents of flooding were reported across Taiwan, primarily affecting Kaohsiung and Keelung, prompting the deployment of approximately 1,500 soldiers in Kaohsiung and neighboring Pingtung to assist with typhoon relief efforts. Keelung's single-day rainfall reached 408 mm (16.1 inches), breaking the previous record of 351.3 mm (13.8 inches), set on September 23, 1980. Record-breaking rainfall totals were also observed, with 1,713.5 mm (67.5 inches) on Lijialin Road in Taitung, 1,570 mm (61.8 inches) on Dahanshan in Pingtung, and 1,067.5 mm (42.0 inches) in Ruifang, New Taipei City.

== Retirement ==
On February 20, 2025, PAGASA retired the name Julian from its rotating naming list due to causing over ₱1 billion pesos in damages despite not making landfall. It will never be used again as a typhoon name within the Philippine Area of Responsibility and will be replaced with Josefa for the 2028 season.

At its 57th Session in February 2025, the ESCAP/WMO Typhoon Committee announced that the name Krathon, along with eight others, would be retired from the naming lists for the Western Pacific despite being used for the first time. In the spring of 2026, the name was replaced by Burapha (บูรพา), which means "east" in Thai.

== See also ==
- Weather of 2024
- Tropical cyclones in 2024
- List of violent typhoons
- List of Philippine typhoons (2000–present)
- Typhoons in Taiwan
