= Typhoon Koinu =

Pacific typhoon in 2023

Typhoon Koinu (Jenny)
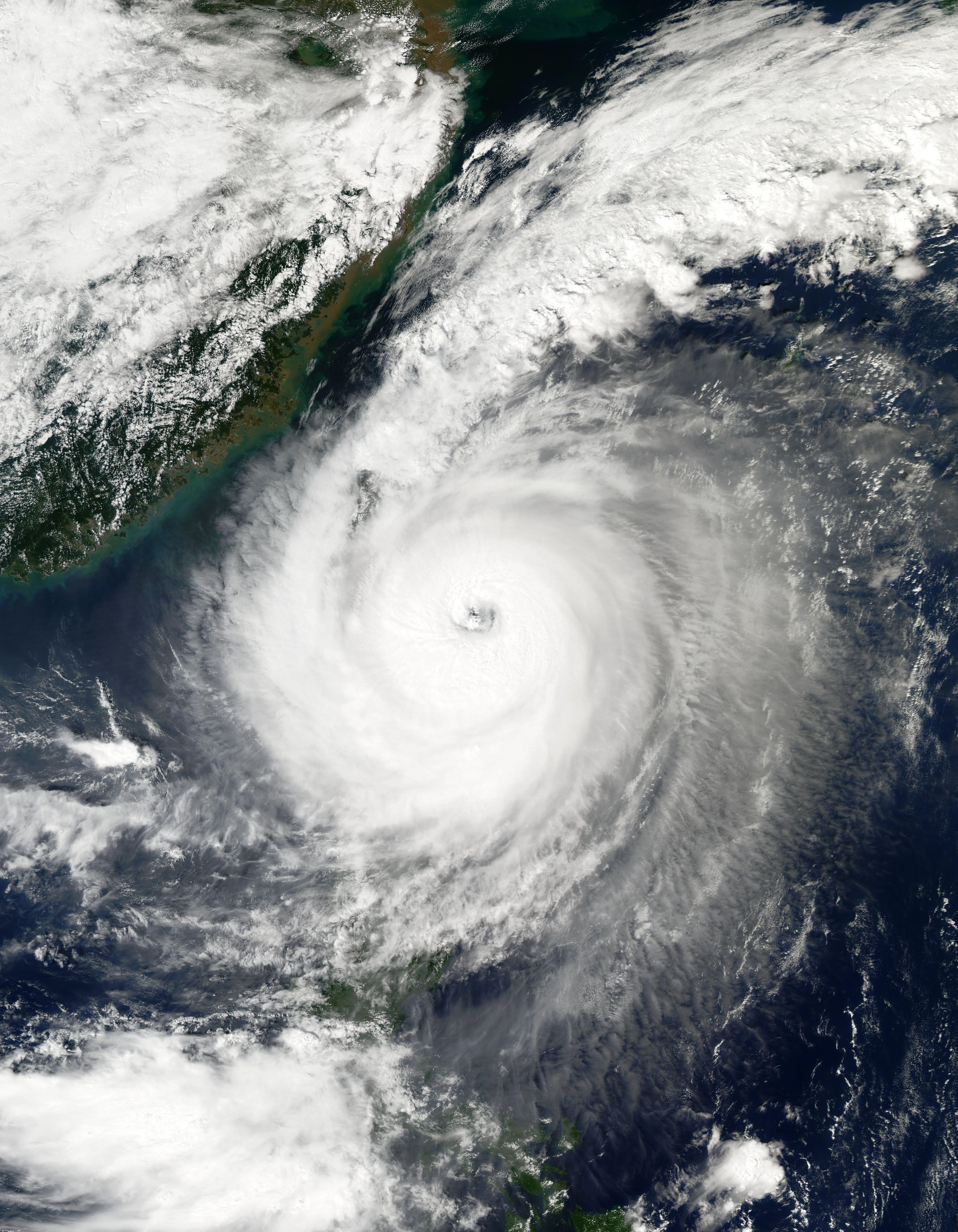
- Koinu at peak intensity while nearing landfall on Taiwan on October 4

Meteorological history
- Formed: September 28, 2023
- Dissipated: October 9, 2023

Very strong typhoon
- 10-minute sustained (JMA)
- Highest winds: 165 km/h (105 mph)
- Lowest pressure: 940 hPa (mbar); 27.76 inHg

Category 4-equivalent typhoon
- 1-minute sustained (SSHWS/JTWC)
- Highest winds: 220 km/h (140 mph)
- Lowest pressure: 936 hPa (mbar); 27.64 inHg

Overall effects
- Fatalities: 1
- Injuries: 399
- Damage: $28.9 million (2023 USD)
- Areas affected: Northern Mariana Islands; Philippines; South China; Hong Kong; Taiwan
- IBTrACS
- Part of the 2023 Pacific typhoon season

Typhoon Koinu, (Note: The name Koinu (Japanese: コイヌ, [ko̞inɯ̟]) refers to the constellation Canis Minor, the puppy, in Japanese.) known in the Philippines as Typhoon Jenny, was a strong and damaging tropical cyclone that made landfall on the southern tip of Taiwan and affected Hong Kong in early October 2023. Koinu was the fourteenth named storm and ninth typhoon of the inactive 2023 Pacific typhoon season. Koinu originated from an area of low pressure near Guam that generally moved westward into the Philippine Sea, where it was upgraded into a depression.

Koinu later underwent rapid intensification and became a Category 3-equivalent typhoon. The storm then weakened before intensifying to attain its peak intensity as a category 4-equivalent typhoon. Koinu passed close by Lanyu then made landfall over Hengchun, Taiwan.

== Meteorological history ==
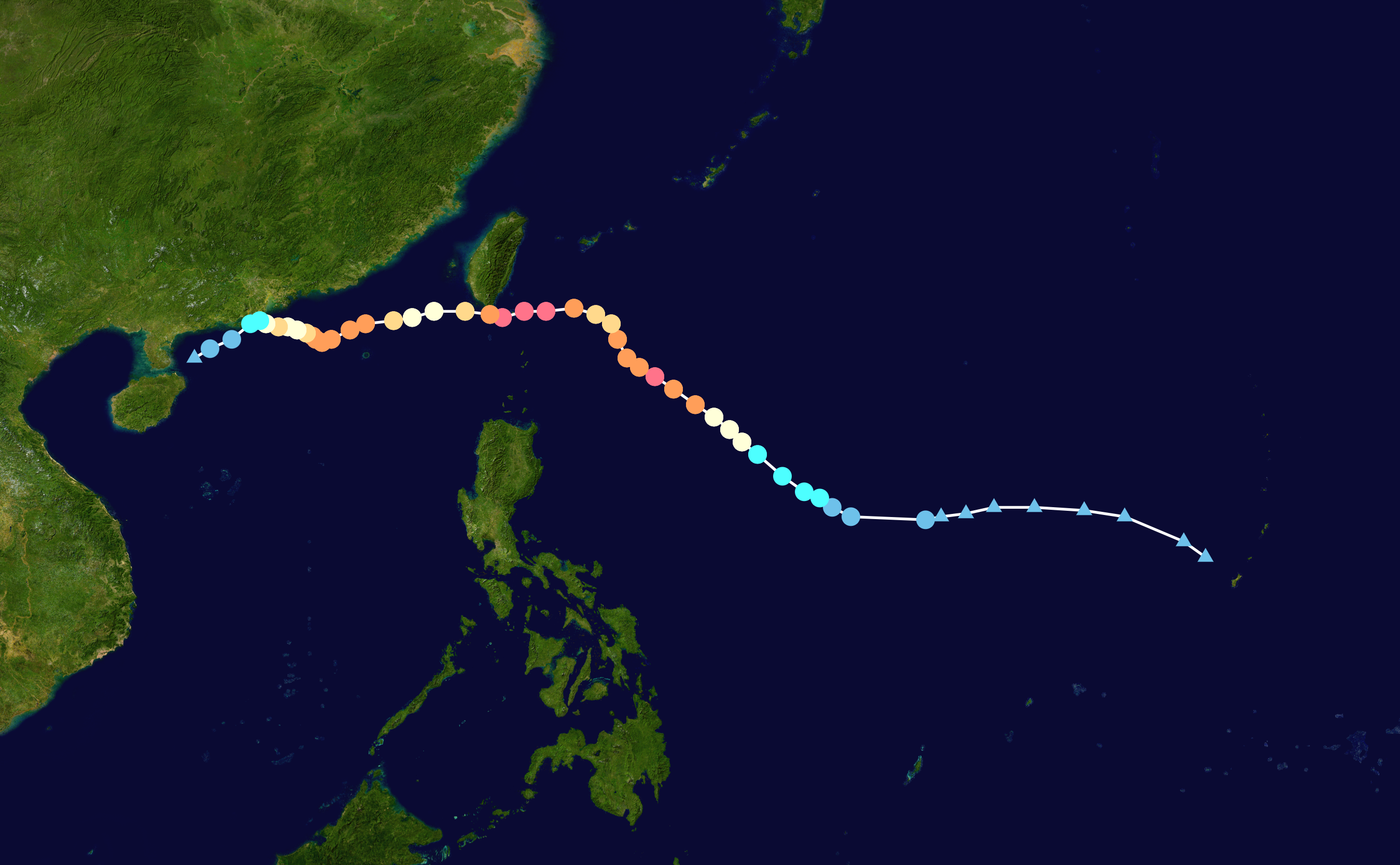
Map plotting the storm's track and intensity, according to the Saffir–Simpson scale Map key Saffir–Simpson scale Tropical depression (≤38 mph, ≤62 km/h) Tropical storm (39–73 mph, 63–118 km/h) Category 1 (74–95 mph, 119–153 km/h) Category 2 (96–110 mph, 154–177 km/h) Category 3 (111–129 mph, 178–208 km/h) Category 4 (130–156 mph, 209–251 km/h) Category 5 (≥157 mph, ≥252 km/h) Unknown Storm type Tropical cyclone Subtropical cyclone Extratropical cyclone, remnant low, tropical disturbance, or monsoon depression

On September 27, a low-pressure area formed near Guam, with the JTWC indicating the potential development of a tropical cyclone. It moved westward into the Philippine Sea until it entered the Philippine Area of Responsibility, where it was later upgraded into a tropical depression and gained the name Jenny by the PAGASA. A Tropical Cyclone Formation Alert was then issued for Jenny as it began to show signs of further organization. Hours later, JTWC gave its identifier 14W at 13:00 UTC (21:00 PHT). On September 28, JMA upgraded 14W into a tropical storm and attained the name Koinu, (Note: The name Koinu (Japanese: コイヌ, [ko̞inɯ̟]) was contributed by Japan and refers to the constellation Canis Minor, the puppy, in Japanese.) which replaced the name Tembin. PAGASA later followed suit at their 5 AM PHT bulletin, also upgrading Jenny into a tropical storm; JTWC followed thereafter.

Koinu moved west northwestward in the Philippine Sea whilst having its low-level circulation exposed due to wind shear. Koinu then later organized further, and by the next day, the JMA upgraded Koinu into a severe tropical storm. As usual, the PAGASA followed suit a few hours later. Koinu later gradually intensified into a Category 1 typhoon by the JTWC. The other agencies also followed suit in upgrading Koinu into a typhoon as an eye began to form. Koinu then began a period of rapid intensification by the evening of October 1 into the early morning hours, intensifying to become a low-end Category 4 typhoon whilst it developed a clear eye as it moved east of Cagayan before weakening slightly. Koinu weakened to Category 2 strength yet rebounded its intensity and reached Category 4 again whilst nearing Taiwan and moving west northwestward. Koinu passed dangerously close to Lanyu, and making its first landfall on mainland Hengchun, Taiwan, later weakening into a Category 3 storm as it did so. Koinu then weakened into a Category 1 after slamming into Taiwan and later exited the PAR into the South China Sea. Contrary to forecasts, Koinu unexpectedly restrengthened back into a Category 2, reforming a clear visible eye surrounded by a powerful eyewall. Koinu further intensified, regaining Category 3 status east of Guangdong.

After re-intensifying, Koinu weakened again for the last time, as it started to move west-northwestward. Dry air intrusion and land interaction continued to weaken the system into a tropical storm on October 9. Afterwards, it weakened to a tropical depression before reaching the Leizhou Peninsula into the Gulf of Tonkin. Both agencies ceased their advisories as Koinu weakened into a remnant low on October 10.

== Preparations and impact ==
=== Philippines ===
As Typhoon Koinu (known as Jenny in the Philippines) approached the Northern Philippines including Extreme Northern Luzon, the PAGASA began issuing warnings for parts of Northern Luzon, and a few days later, Signal #3 was raised on Itbayat, Batanes as the typhoon brought showers and gusty winds to the islands.

As Jenny moved further away and weakened, the rains and winds started to subside, however, locals were still warned that the storm may still trigger moderate to rough seas in the areas affected.

=== Taiwan ===
Taiwanese authorities issued weather warnings in preparation of strong gusts and heavy rain hitting the island's southeast. According to news sources, flights were canceled, schools and businesses were closed, and fishermen secured their boats. While the storm is likely to bring the most rain to hilly and sparsely inhabited areas, it will also affect the large port city of Kaohsiung.

As Koinu made landfall, it brought record-breaking winds and rains. A weather station on Orchid Island recorded sustained winds of 198.7 kilometres per hour (123.5 mph) at 9:40 p.m. and gusts of 342.7 kilometres per hour (212.9 mph) 13 minutes later, both representing record-highs since record-keeping began in 1897. Many trees fell down on roads and damaged infrastructure. A landslide occurred on Provincial Highway No. 9 in Pingtung County forcing vehicles to drive on the same lane, while 2 roads in Taitung County, Provincial Highway 20 in Haiduan Township and Provincial Highway 23 in Donghe Township were blocked.

Agricultural losses in Taiwan were about NT$344.56 million (US$10.72 million), according to the Ministry of Agriculture (MOA). The five administrative areas that sustained the greatest losses were Yunlin, Changhua, Taichung, Chiayi, and Tainan. Around 9,762 hectares of crops were damaged. Peanuts were the crop that sustained the largest losses, while chickens and pigs were the largest livestock and poultry losses.

=== Hong Kong ===
As Typhoon Koinu neared Hong Kong, the Hong Kong Observatory (HKO) issued Increasing Storm Signal No. 9 at 19:00 (HKT) and weather warnings in preparations for heavy rainfall and strong winds ahead of the storm. The agency then considered if they would hoist their second Hurricane Signal No. 10 since Typhoon Saola if the storm passed further closely to Hong Kong.

However, as Koinu moved away from Hong Kong and started weakening, the HKO did not need to issue the highest wind signal. The Increasing Storm Signal No. 9 was kept in force for 4 hours before lowered it down to Southwest Gale or Storm Signal No. 8. Total economic losses amounted to HK$142.3 million (US$18.22 million).

== See also ==
- Weather of 2023
- Tropical cyclones in 2023
- Typhoon Nepartak (2016)
- Typhoon Meranti (2016)
- Typhoon Haikui (2023)
- Typhoon Saola (2023)
- Typhoon Danas (2025) – a Category 3 typhoon that caused flooding in Taiwan and had a similar track to Koinu.
- Typhoon Podul (2025)
