= Typhoon Thelma (1977) =

Pacific typhoon in 1977

Typhoon Thelma (Goring)
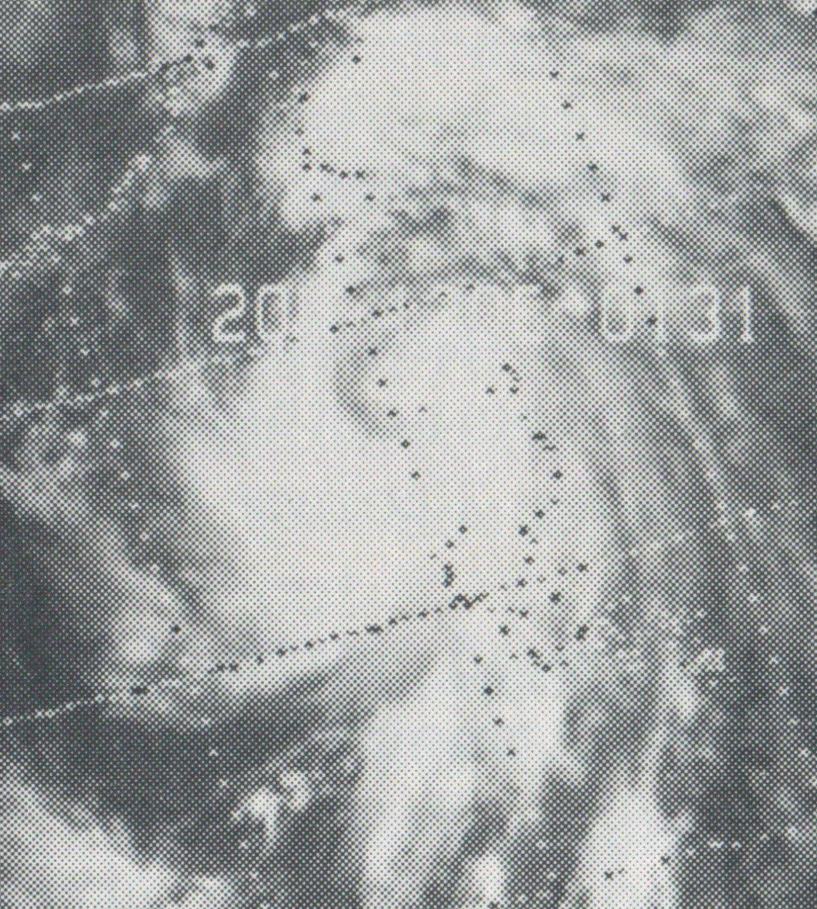
- Thelma near peak intensity on July 24

Meteorological history
- Formed: July 21, 1977
- Dissipated: July 26, 1977

Typhoon
- 10-minute sustained (JMA)
- Highest winds: 130 km/h (80 mph)
- Lowest pressure: 950 hPa (mbar); 28.05 inHg

Category 2-equivalent typhoon
- 1-minute sustained (SSHWS/JTWC)
- Highest winds: 155 km/h (100 mph)
- Lowest pressure: 957 hPa (mbar); 28.26 inHg

Overall effects
- Fatalities: 33
- Injuries: 119
- Missing: 1
- Damage: >$629 million (1977 USD)
- Areas affected: Philippines, Taiwan, China
- Part of the 1977 Pacific typhoon season

Typhoon Thelma, also known in the Philippines as Typhoon Goring, was a deadly and destructive typhoon which impacted the Philippines, Taiwan, and China during July 1977. The twelfth tropical depression, fourth tropical storm, and second typhoon of the inactive 1977 Pacific typhoon season, Thelma originated from a tropical depression near the Philippines. Developing into a tropical storm on July 21, Thelma underwent further intensification due to a tropical upper tropospheric trough to the north and strongly divergent upper level northeasterlies to the south, helped Thelma to intensify into a typhoon later that day. Passing just northeast of the Philippines two days later, Thelma would not undergo further development due to the TUTT cell receding northwards, making landfall in the Port of Kaohsiung on July 25. Rapidly weakening once inland, Thelma entered Taiwan Strait and made landfall in Fuzhou, China as a tropical depression, dissipating on July 27.

In Taiwan, Thelma was highly destructive, prompting a member of the Joint Typhoon Warning Center to state that it "brought more destruction on Taiwan than any event since World War II." In Kaohsiung alone, 119 people were injured while 28 were killed. Thelma's winds knocked over 155 steel towers and their power lines, causing blackouts for nearly all of Southern Taiwan. In Northern Taiwan, most of the 40 thousand factories had to curtail production, with 150 manufacturing plants suspending all production due to the typhoon's destruction. Many rivers burst their embankments, flooding many acres of farmland and drowning four. Elsewhere, in the Philippines, one person died while another went missing.

== Meteorological history ==
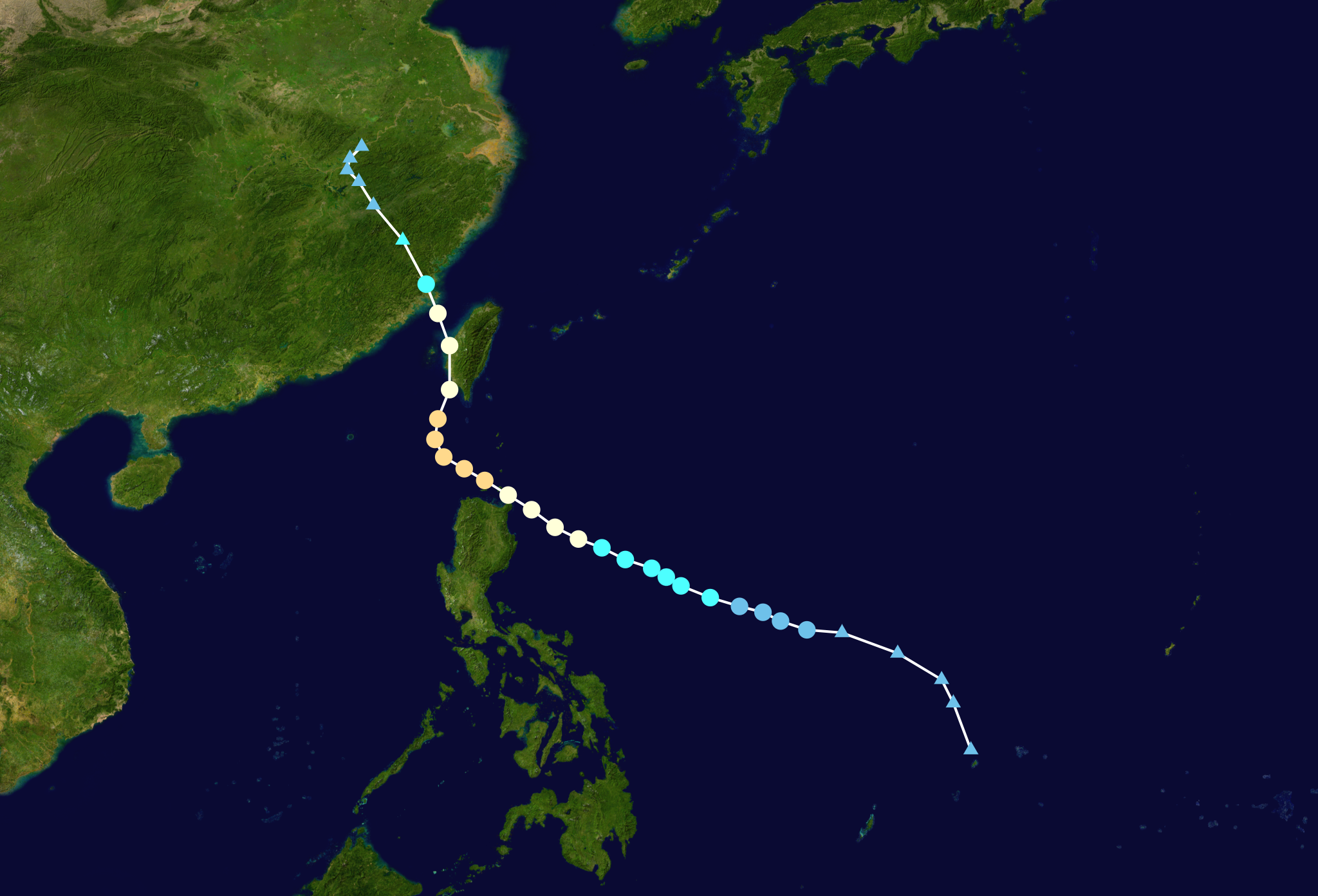
Map plotting the storm's track and intensity, according to the Saffir–Simpson scale Map key Saffir–Simpson scale Tropical depression (≤38 mph, ≤62 km/h) Tropical storm (39–73 mph, 63–118 km/h) Category 1 (74–95 mph, 119–153 km/h) Category 2 (96–110 mph, 154–177 km/h) Category 3 (111–129 mph, 178–208 km/h) Category 4 (130–156 mph, 209–251 km/h) Category 5 (≥157 mph, ≥252 km/h) Unknown Storm type Tropical cyclone Subtropical cyclone Extratropical cyclone, remnant low, tropical disturbance, or monsoon depression

The system that later became Typhoon Thelma was first identified as a tropical depression east of the Philippines on July 19. This depression was later detected by satellite imagery early the next day as it organized in the central Philippine Sea. As the depression had developed inside the Philippine Area of Responsibility, the Philippine Atmospheric, Geophysical, and Astronomical Services Administration (PAGASA) named the depression Goring that same day.

On July 21, the depression had organized enough for the Joint Typhoon Warning Center to issue their first warning on the depression as Tropical Depression 06W. Reconnaissance aircraft that same day found flight level winds of 55 kn (102 km/h; 63 mph), which alongside corroborating satellite data, prompted both the JTWC and JMA to upgrade the depression into Tropical Storm Thelma Thelma underwent further intensification due to intense cyclonic cells which were from a tropical upper tropospheric trough (TUTT) to the north, which supplied highly efficient outflow channels for the nascent storm. This alongside strongly divergent upper level northeasterlies over Indonesia and the South China Sea to the south, helped Thelma to further intensify. As a result, on 18:00 UTC that day, the JMA noted that Thelma had intensified into a typhoon.

Thelma continued moving northwestward at a speed of 10 mph (17 km/h) toward the southern periphery of the mid-tropospheric subtropical ridge. As a result, on the evening of July 23, Thelma entered the Bashi Channel, passing just 10 nautical miles (19 km) northeast of Escarpada Point, Philippines. Around that time, the JMA noted that Thelma peaked with 10-minute sustained winds of 80 mph (130 km/h), with further development not occurring due to the TUTT cell receding northwards. As Thelma exited the Philippine Area of Responsibility on July 24, causing PAGASA to stop tracking it, an extratropical low deepening over eastern Mongolia caused a weakness in the ridge. This caused Thelma to recurve northwards, slowing down to a movement of 6.9 mph (11 km/h).

On the morning of July 25, radar data alongside satellite imagery shown that Thelma had begun accelerating north-northeast at a speed of 12 mph (19 km/h). As a result, on 09:39 UTC that same day with sustained winds of at least 50 mph (85 km/h), Thelma made landfall in the Port of Kaohsiung. Rapidly weakening once inland, Thelma entered Taiwan Strait and early the next day, made landfall in Fuzhou, China as a tropical depression. Both agencies stopped tracking Thelma on July 27.

== Preparations and impacts ==
=== Taiwan ===
In Taiwan, Thelma was highly destructive, prompting a member of the Joint Typhoon Warning Center to state that it "brought more destruction on Taiwan than any event since World War II." In Kaohsiung, 119 people were injured while 20,000 homes sustained some damage. 18 small ships would be sunk with another 10 sustaining heavy damage. The typhoon inflicted "substantial damage" to an aluminum smelter in the port, later decommissioning 150 pots and causing USD$25 million in damage. The former British Consulate in Kaohsiung was destroyed due to heavy winds. A total of 28 people were killed in the port. No other typhoon made landfall in Kaohsiung until Typhoon Krathon did so on October 3, 2024.

Due to Thelma, the opening ceremony of the 1977 Little League World Series was postponed a day, not occurring until July 27. Thelma's winds knocked over 155 steel towers and their power lines. The resulting blackouts affected over 99% of Southern Taiwan, with around 6 thousand being unusable. Elsewhere, in Northern Taiwan, most of the 40 thousand factories had to curtail production, with 150 manufacturing plants suspending all production due to the typhoon's destruction. Many rivers burst their embankments, flooding many acres of farmland and trapping over 10,000 people inside their homes. Four people drowned due to these floods. In total, Thelma caused at least NT$20 billion (USD$623 million) according to the Central Weather Administration.

=== Elsewhere ===
In the Philippines, one person died while another went missing. Around ₱50 million (USD$6.78 million) in infrastructural and agricultural damage occurred in the nation.

== Aftermath ==
After the typhoon, members of Tzu Chi organized fundraising and relief efforts for survivors of Typhoon Thelma. By October, the organization stated it had raised over NT$718,000 and provided assistance to 144 households. Prime Minister Chiang Ching-kuo presided over an emergency meeting of the Cabinet prior to flying to the south to inspect relief efforts. Troops were ordered to help rebuild damaged homes and restore power, the water supply, transport, and communications across the nation. Although these relief efforts occurred in "an amazingly short time", Vera, which impacted Taiwan 6 days later, compromised the year-long process of mending the 32 boats sank and 22 ships damaged during Thelma.
