= Typhoon Chanthu (2021) =

Pacific typhoon in 2021

Typhoon Chanthu (Kiko)
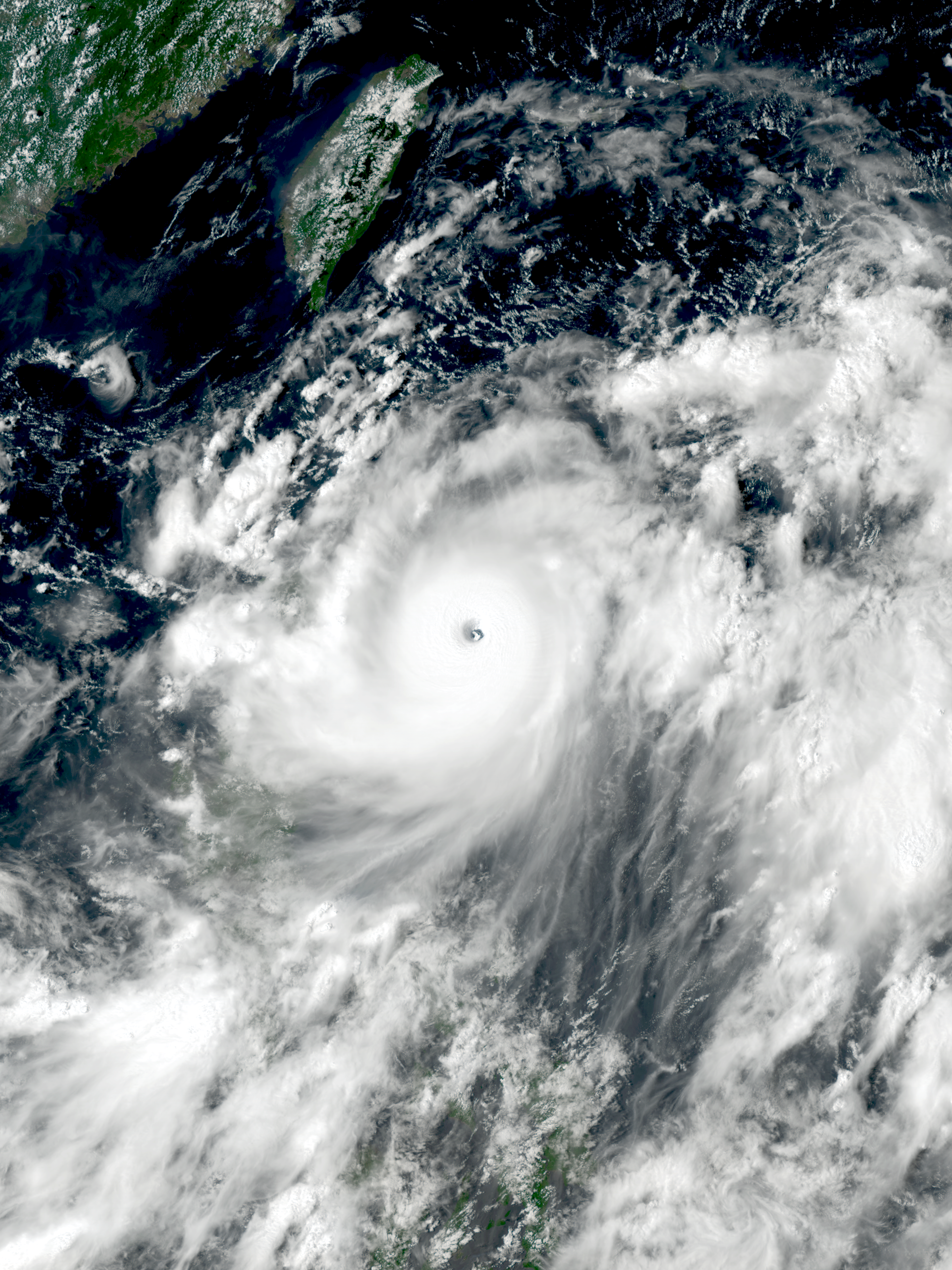
- Typhoon Chanthu shortly before peak intensity on September 10

Meteorological history
- Formed: September 5, 2021
- Remnant low: September 18, 2021
- Dissipated: September 20, 2021

Violent typhoon
- 10-minute sustained (JMA)
- Highest winds: 215 km/h (130 mph)
- Lowest pressure: 905 hPa (mbar); 26.72 inHg

Category 5-equivalent super typhoon
- 1-minute sustained (SSHWS/JTWC)
- Highest winds: 285 km/h (180 mph)
- Lowest pressure: 902 hPa (mbar); 26.64 inHg

Overall effects
- Fatalities: None
- Damage: $30 million (2021 USD)
- Areas affected: Philippines, Taiwan, China, Japan, South Korea
- IBTrACS
- Part of the 2021 Pacific typhoon season

Typhoon Chanthu, known in the Philippines as Super Typhoon Kiko, was the second most intense tropical cyclone worldwide in 2021 after Typhoon Surigae in April. It impacted the Cagayan Valley region of the Philippines and became the strongest typhoon to affect the Batanes province since Typhoon Meranti in 2016. The twenty-ninth tropical depression, fourteenth named storm and fourth typhoon of the 2021 Pacific typhoon season, Chanthu originated from a disturbance well east of the Philippine islands on September 5 which organized into a tropical depression later that day.

By the next day, the depression had formed into a mature tropical storm which began to explosively intensify by September 7, featuring a pinhole eye on satellite, characteristic of rapidly intensifying storms. Chanthu became a Category 5-equivalent super typhoon by September 8, the highest category on the Saffir–Simpson scale. Subsequent eyewall replacement cycles caused intensity fluctuations, but on September 10, Chanthu peaked with 1-minute sustained winds of 285 km/h (180 mph) just northeast of extreme northeastern Luzon. The typhoon passed very near the Babuyan Islands before passing directly over Ivana, Batanes as a weakening but still powerful Category 5-equivalent super typhoon. Chanthu continued steadily weakening as it passed just east of Taiwan and eventually stalled just east of Shanghai, China. The storm eventually made its second and final landfall near Ikitsuki, Nagasaki in Japan, before crossing the country's mountainous terrain and becoming an extratropical cyclone on September 18. Chanthu then continued eastward and curved southward, before dissipating on September 20. According to Aon Benfield, economic losses totaled US$30 million.

== Meteorological history ==
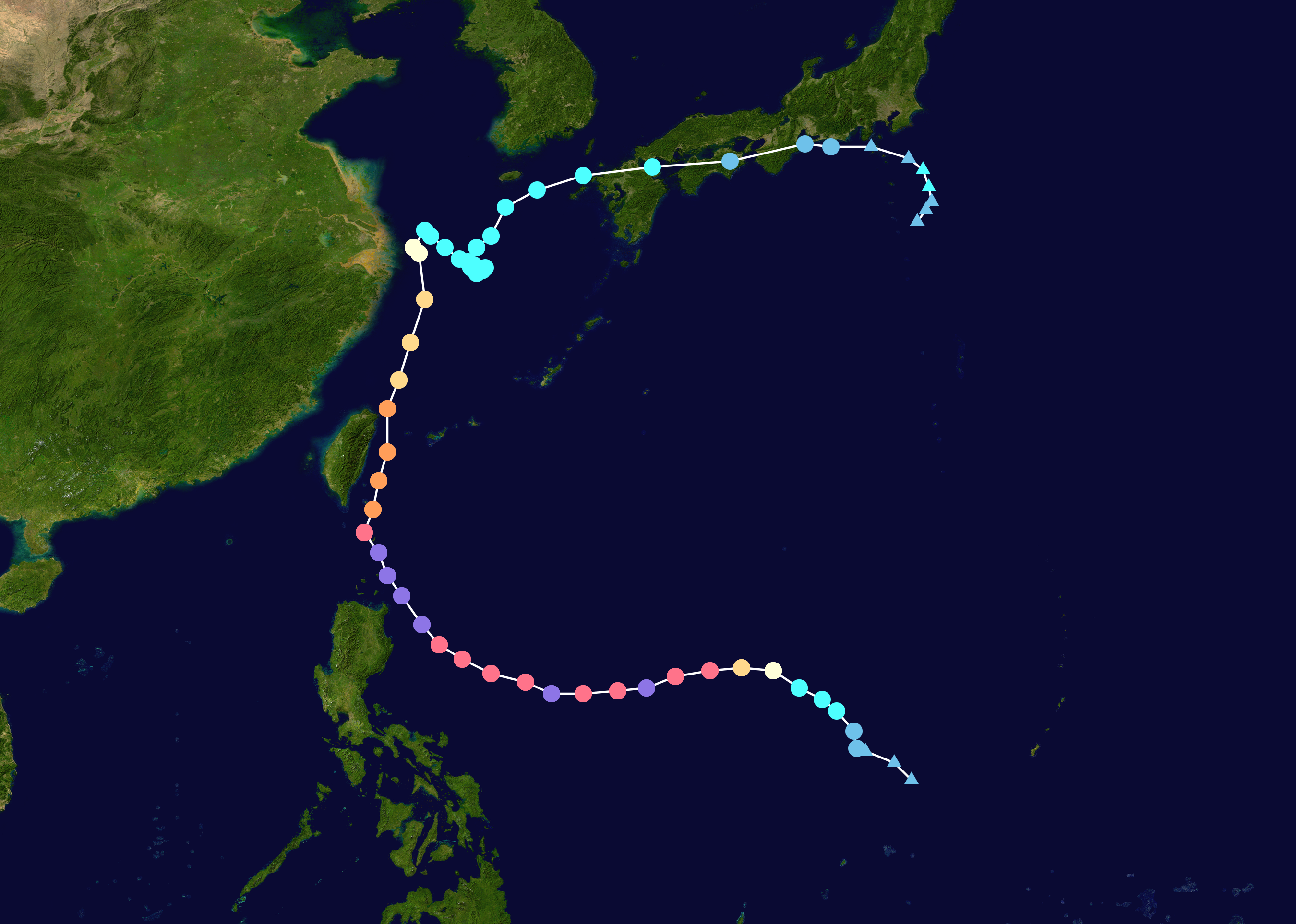
Map plotting the storm's track and intensity, according to the Saffir–Simpson scale Map key Saffir–Simpson scale Tropical depression (≤38 mph, ≤62 km/h) Tropical storm (39–73 mph, 63–118 km/h) Category 1 (74–95 mph, 119–153 km/h) Category 2 (96–110 mph, 154–177 km/h) Category 3 (111–129 mph, 178–208 km/h) Category 4 (130–156 mph, 209–251 km/h) Category 5 (≥157 mph, ≥252 km/h) Unknown Storm type Tropical cyclone Subtropical cyclone Extratropical cyclone, remnant low, tropical disturbance, or monsoon depression

At 06:00 UTC on September 5, the JTWC began to monitor an area of disturbed weather that had formed 446 nmi (513 mi; 826 km) from Legazpi, Philippines. At 18:00 UTC the same day, the JMA declared the system a tropical depression. Later in the day, the JTWC issued a Tropical Cyclone Formation Alert as the system's low-level circulation center and its surrounding convection had improved significantly in organization. At 09:00 UTC the next day, the JTWC upgraded the disturbance to a tropical depression, designating as 19W. At 21:00 UTC, the JTWC upgraded it to a tropical storm; they also noted the formation of an eye-like feature on satellite images. The JMA later did the same at 00:00 UTC of September 7, providing the name Chanthu. (Note: The name Chanthu (Khmer: ច័ន្ធូ, [can.ˈtʰuː]) was contributed by Cambodia and means tuberose (Polianthes tuberosa) in Khmer.) At 09:30 UTC, the PAGASA reported that Chanthu entered the Philippine Area of Responsibility (PAR) and was named Kiko. At 12:00 UTC, as satellite based intensity estimates from the Dvorak technique increased, the JMA upgraded Chanthu to a severe tropical storm. At the same moment, Chanthu started rapid intensification as it quickly became a Category 1-equivalent typhoon. Satellite imagery indicate a development of a vertical hot tower over its center, with microwave imagery indicating that it had developed a very small eye feature. At 15:00 UTC, it had become a Category 2-equivalent typhoon, as it continued explosive intensification. A pinhole eye, a typical sign of a rapidly intensifying tropical cyclone, had developed by that time. Six hours later, the typhoon reached Category 4 status, with one-minute sustained wind speeds of 125 kn (230 km/h; 145 mph). By the next day, at 09:00 UTC, Chanthu had reached Category 5-equivalent intensity, developing a 5 nmi (10 km; 5 mi)-wide eye which was by very intense convection, making it the second super typhoon of the year and marking the storm's initial peak intensity.

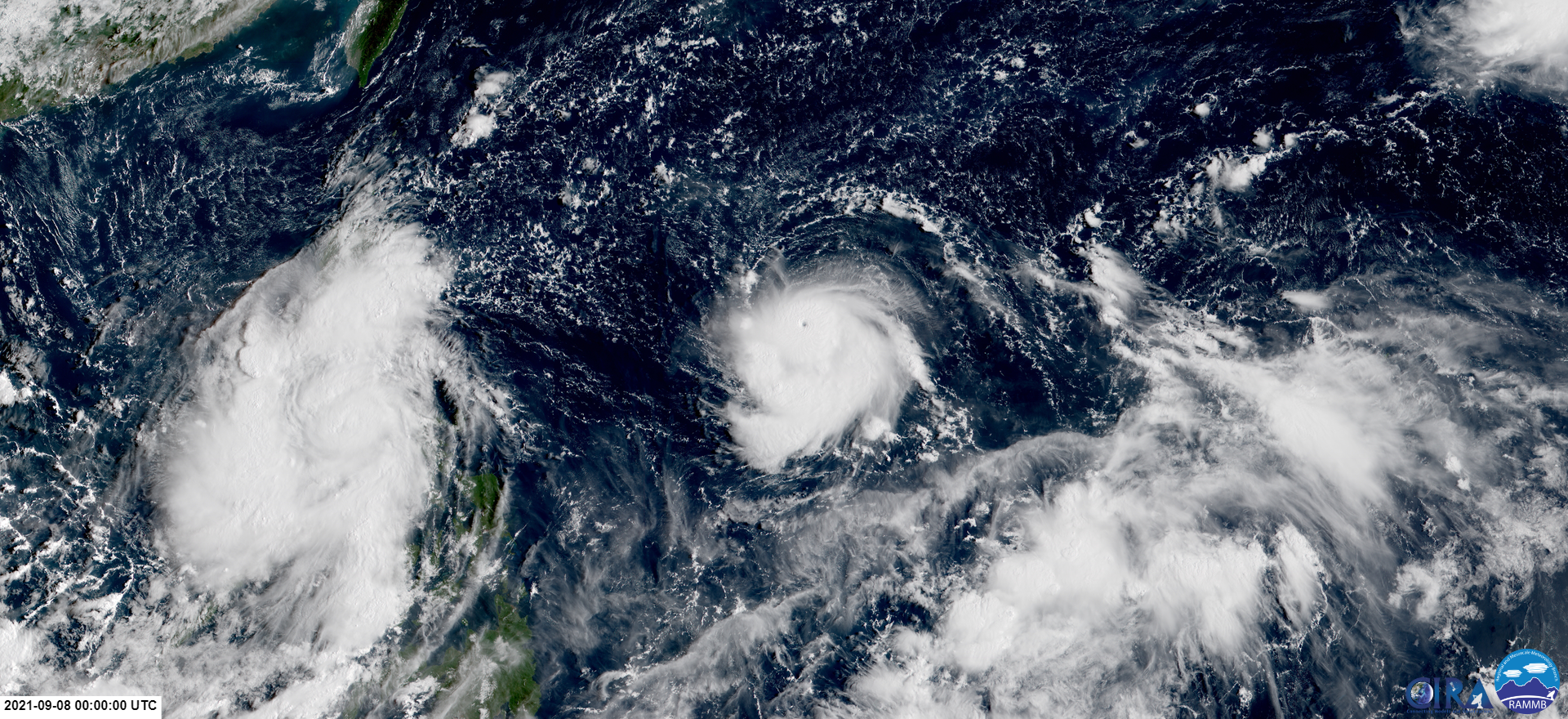
Tropical Storm Conson (left) and Typhoon Chanthu at its initial peak. (right) on September 8.

After reaching its initial peak, Chanthu was downgraded to a Category 4-equivalent super typhoon at 09:00 UTC on September 9, as its highly compact eye started to become cloud-filled, indicating the start of an eyewall replacement cycle. However, shortly after, Chanthu quickly re-intensified into a Category 5-equivalent super typhoon yet again at 09:00 UTC that day, as its eye became clear again. On 05:00 PhST of September 11 (21:00 UTC of September 10), the PAGASA reported that Chanthu passed to the east of the Babuyan Islands; at 08:30 PhST (00:30 UTC), Chanthu made landfall in Ivana, Batanes as a Category 5 super typhoon with 1-minute sustained winds of 270 km/h (165 mph) as the storm began to weaken slightly. At 15:00 UTC on September 11, Chanthu weakened to a Category 4-equivalent typhoon as it continued to move northward because of the presence of dry air. It was further downgraded to a Category 3-equivalent typhoon by the JTWC on September 12 at 03:00 UTC as it moved towards the east coast of Taiwan, experiencing multiple eyewall replacement cycles, increasing wind shear and dry, stable air. Three hours later, the PAGASA issued its last bulletin on the system since it had exited the PAR. At 15:00 UTC, Chanthu weakened to a Category 2-equivalent typhoon as the dry air started to hamper the typhoon's convective structure. According to satellite imagery, the low-level circulation center had become ill-defined and the eye started to collapse. The weakening trend of Chanthu continued as it moved further northward towards the Korean Peninsula because of increasing wind shear, dry air and cool sea surface temperatures. At 09:00 UTC of September 13, Chanthu further weakened into a Category 1 typhoon as it moved further north towards Shanghai. By 15:00 UTC, the eye of Chanthu had completely collapsed. Chanthu remained quasi-stationary near Shanghai because of weak steering flow. At 06:00 UTC the next day, the JMA downgraded Chanthu to a severe tropical storm as it moved southeastward. Three hours later, the JTWC downgraded Chanthu to a tropical storm as its low-level circulation became partially exposed, with convection only remaining to the north and west. At 12:00 UTC, the JMA further downgraded it to a tropical storm as it slowly moved south-eastward towards Japan. At 00:00 UTC on September 15, due to decreasing wind shear and marginally favorable sea surface temperatures, Chanthu re-strengthened and was re-classified as a severe tropical storm that day. After continued slow movement, on September 17 at 09:00 UTC, Chanthu made landfall near Ikitsuki-shima in southwestern Japan. It continued to move northward as it moved through the rugged Japanese islands, causing it to weaken significantly. This caused the JMA to downgrade it to a tropical storm at 12:00 UTC. At 21:00 UTC, the JTWC downgraded it to a tropical depression as it rapidly collapsed because of the rugged terrain; it was also undergoing extratropical transition. On September 18 at 08:00 UTC, the JTWC issued its final warning for the system, as the system became extratropical. Afterward, Chanthu's remnant continued moving eastward and then curved southward, before dissipating on September 20.

== Preparations ==
In the Philippines, 415 people were evacuated. As Chanthu came closer towards Luzon, the PAGASA issued Signal No. 1 warnings over Cagayan and Isabela provinces. At 23:00 PhST of September 9, the PAGASA raised a Signal No. 2 warning over the northeastern portion of Cagayan and eastern portion of Babuyan and Signal No. 1 was further extended over Batanes, rest of Cagayan and Babuyan, northeastern portion of Apayao and eastern portion of Isabela. At 05:00 PhST the next day, a Signal No. 3 warning was raised over Santa Ana, Cagayan.

At 05:30 NST of September 10, the Central Weather Bureau in Taiwan issued a sea warning, which was followed by a land warning for Super Typhoon Chanthu. At 17:00 PhST, the PAGASA raised a Signal No. 4 warning over the northeastern portion of Babuyan Islands. President of Taiwan, Tsai Ing-wen advised people to stay indoors due to torrential rain and strong winds. Transportation in Taiwan was also halted, with over 100 flights, trains and 46 ferries to Matsu and other surrounding islands cancelled. Around 2,000 people in landslide-prone areas in the eastern portions of Hualien County were evacuated, and sections of highway in the area were closed by authorities. The Taiwanese Defence Ministry put 31,000 troops on standby.

The storm shut down both China's Shanghai Port and the Port of Ningbo-Zhoushan, the world's largest port by cargo throughput, between September 12–14. About 86 vessels were left waiting outside the ports.

== Impact ==
=== Philippines ===
Satellite animation of Typhoon Chanthu skirting northeastern Luzon on September 10

The Batanes Islands suffered a direct hit from Chanthu, which destroyed infrastructure and caused power outages there. Some local residents called it "the strongest typhoon" they had seen. More than 30,000 residents were affected in the Ilocos, Cagayan Valley, Central Luzon and the Cordillera Administrative Region. Four municipalities lost power, and one municipality experienced a water supply outage; those services were not restored as of September 15. There were also reports of landslides and flooding, mostly from Ilocos and Central Luzon. According to the National Disaster Risk Reduction and Management Council (NDRRMC), total damages from the typhoon were up to ₱37.4 million (US$748,000).

=== Taiwan ===
The eastern portions of Hualien and Taitung counties received around 200 mm (7.9 in) of rain from the typhoon. The storm brought waves of up to 7 m (23 ft) on Orchid Island. Authorities reported that 26,000 houses lost power. The capital city of Taiwan, Taipei, also received heavy rainfall. Winds up to 164 km/h (102 mph) were reported.

=== South Korea ===
As Chanthu passed near the island of Jeju, it caused winds up to 30 to 40 m/s (110 to 145 km/h; 65 to 90 mph) and 50 mm (2.0 in) of rainfall. There were reports of structural damage and overwhelmed drainage systems on the island. 23 flights were grounded and 48 ferry sailings were cancelled.

=== Japan ===
Chanthu left seven people injured across Japan while it traversed the country as a weakening system. Train services were suspended and flights cancelled as a result of adverse weather. Over 7,000 households on Kyushu lost power. In Mihama, Wakayama, strong winds damaged the roofs of 50 houses and shattered several windows.

== See also ==
- Weather of 2021
- Tropical cyclones in 2021
- Typhoon Zeb (1998)
- Typhoon Nida (2004)
- Typhoon Noul (2015)
- Typhoon Meranti
- Typhoon Mangkhut
- Typhoon Nanmadol (2011)
- Typhoon Doksuri (2023)
