= Typhoon Fanapi =

Pacific typhoon in 2010

Typhoon Fanapi (Inday)
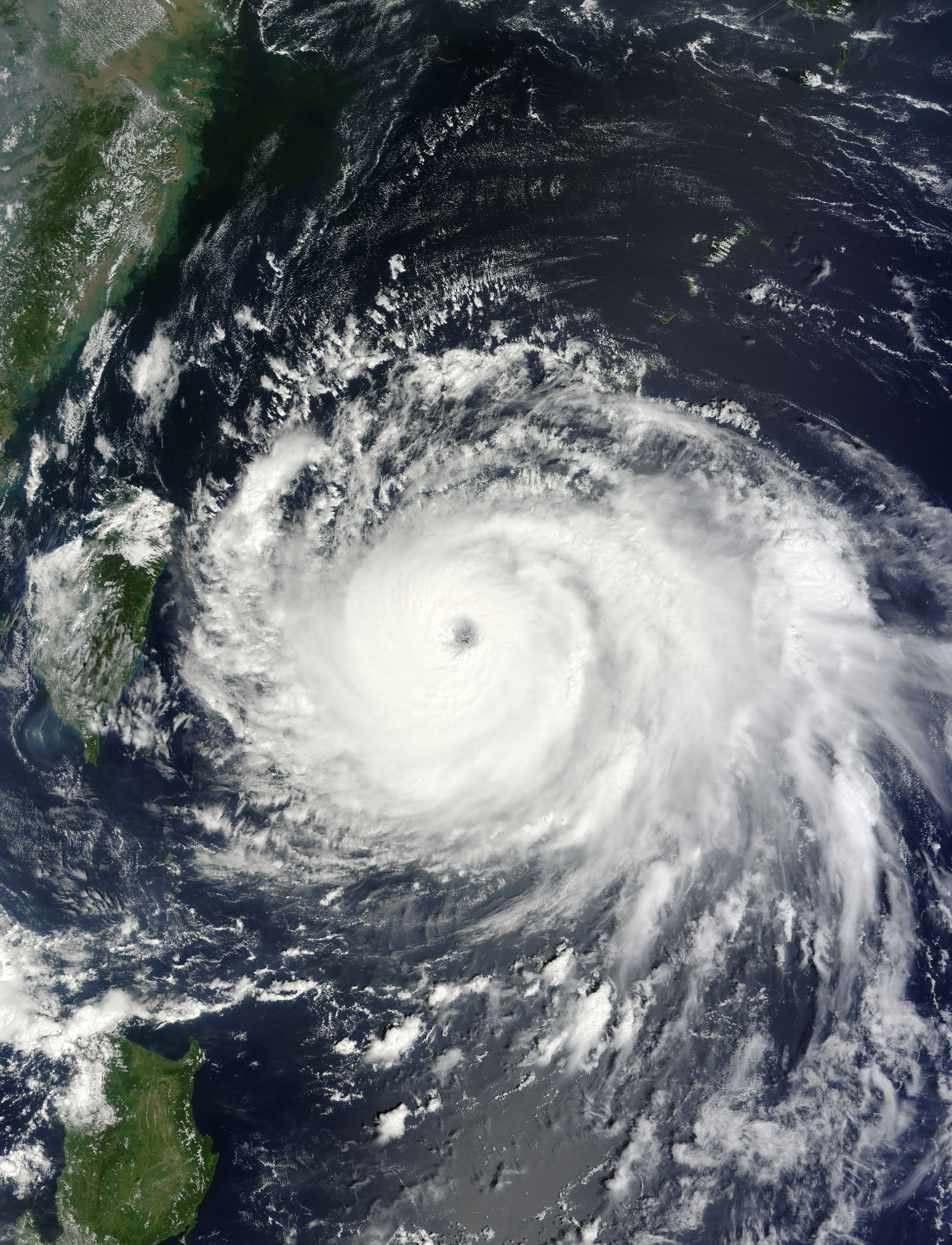
- Typhoon Fanapi approaching Taiwan on September 18

Meteorological history
- Formed: September 14, 2010
- Dissipated: September 21, 2010

Very strong typhoon
- 10-minute sustained (JMA)
- Highest winds: 175 km/h (110 mph)
- Lowest pressure: 930 hPa (mbar); 27.46 inHg

Category 3-equivalent typhoon
- 1-minute sustained (SSHWS/JTWC)
- Highest winds: 195 km/h (120 mph)
- Lowest pressure: 944 hPa (mbar); 27.88 inHg

Overall effects
- Fatalities: 105 total
- Damage: $1 billion (2010 USD)
- Areas affected: Japan, Taiwan, China
- IBTrACS
- Part of the 2010 Pacific typhoon season

Typhoon Fanapi, (Note: The name Fanapi (Chuukese: Fánáápi, [fænæːpi]) was contributed by the Federated States of Micronesia and refers to a group of low-lying, sandy atolls in northwest Chuuk in Chuukese.) known in the Philippines as Typhoon Inday, was a damaging and deadly typhoon that struck Taiwan and southeastern China in mid-September 2010. It was the deadliest typhoon to hit Taiwan since Typhoon Morakot in August 2009. It was the eleventh tropical storm and fourth typhoon of the very inactive season. The storm formed on September 14 east of the Philippines and moved slowly for several days, initially to the northwest, then curving to the northeast before turning westward due to a ridge to the north. During this time, Fanapi intensified to reach 10 minute maximum sustained winds of 175 km/h (109 mph). Fanapi made its first landfall on September 19 over Hualien, Taiwan, becoming the first typhoon to hit the island since Typhoon Morakot in August 2009. Later that day made a final landfall in Fujian, China. The storm dissipated on September 21 over southern China.

The typhoon first affected southern Japan, bringing rainfall to the outer Miyako Islands. However, impacts were worst in Taiwan and mainland China. In southern Taiwan, Fanapi dropped heavy rainfall, peaking at 1,126 mm (44.3 in) in Majia, Pingtung. About 150,000 people evacuated their homes, and there were heightened preparations after the damaging effects of Typhoon Morakot the previous year. The heavy rainfall from Fanapi caused landslides, heavy crop damage, and flooding, notably in the major city of Kaohsiung, where rains totaled 506 mm (19.9 in). In some areas of the city, the floods reached over one-story deep, inundating cars and causing about NT$3 billion (New Taiwan dollar, US$93.75 million) in industrial damage. (Note: All damage totals are in 2003 values of their respective currencies.) There were five deaths in Taiwan during the storm's passage, and damage was estimated at NT$5 billion (US$158 million).

Later, the threat from Fanapi caused 264,000 people to evacuate their homes in southeastern China. The storm dropped heavy rainfall in the region, reaching 640 mm (25 in) in Guangdong. Fanapi also caused landslides there, killing 100 people, including 28 in Xinyi due to a collapse at a mine. Also in Guangdong, the storm wrecked 16,000 homes and flooded 66,400 ha (164,000 acres) of crop fields. Provincial damage was estimated at ¥5.15 billion (CNY, $757.05 million). The name Fanapi was later retired due to the heavy damage.

== Meteorological history ==
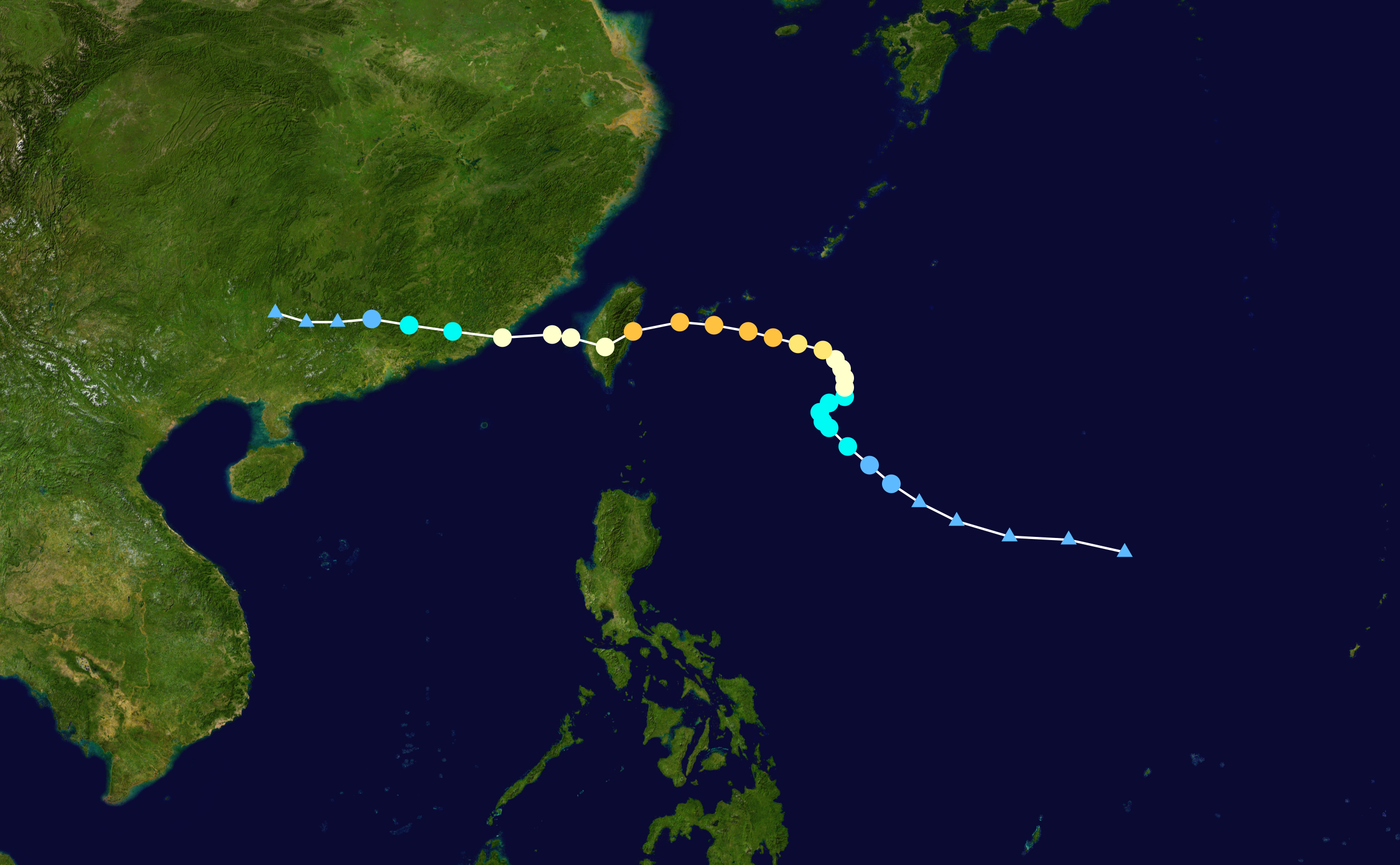
Map plotting the storm's track and intensity, according to the Saffir–Simpson scale Map key Saffir–Simpson scale Tropical depression (≤38 mph, ≤62 km/h) Tropical storm (39–73 mph, 63–118 km/h) Category 1 (74–95 mph, 119–153 km/h) Category 2 (96–110 mph, 154–177 km/h) Category 3 (111–129 mph, 178–208 km/h) Category 4 (130–156 mph, 209–251 km/h) Category 5 (≥157 mph, ≥252 km/h) Unknown Storm type Tropical cyclone Subtropical cyclone Extratropical cyclone, remnant low, tropical disturbance, or monsoon depression

An area of convection, or thunderstorms, persisted west of Guam on September 13, in association with the monsoon trough. The system gradually developed a low-level circulation and rainbands, aided by low wind shear from an anticyclone aloft. Late on September 14, the Japan Meteorological Agency (JMA) (Note: The Japan Meteorological Agency is the official Regional Specialized Meteorological Center for the western Pacific Ocean.) designated the system as a tropical depression to the east of the Philippine island of Luzon. Around the same time, the Joint Typhoon Warning Center (JTWC) (Note: The Joint Typhoon Warning Center is a joint United States Navy – United States Air Force task force that issues tropical cyclone warnings for the western Pacific Ocean and other regions.) classified the system as Tropical Depression 12W. A nearby tropical upper tropospheric trough limited the depression's outflow to the north, although convection continued to increase. The depression moved northwestward along the southwestern periphery of a ridge. At 03:00 UTC on September 15, the Philippine-based PAGASA began warning on the system, giving it the local name Inday. Nine hours later, the JMA named the system Tropical Storm Fanapi.

As a strengthening tropical storm, Fanapi developed deeper convection near the center. A passing trough to the north weakened the ridge and caused the storm to slow, turning northeastward by September 16. That day, Fanapi developed an eye feature, becoming a typhoon at 18:00 UTC. As the ridge built into the East China Sea, the storm responded by turning to the northwest, and at the same time, outflow improved to the north. The eye organized further as it contracted to a diameter of 19 km (12 mi). By that time, the typhoon was moving due westward toward Taiwan, steered by a ridge over northeastern China. At 06:00 UTC on September 18, the JTWC estimated that Fanapi attained peak 1 minute winds of 195 km/h (120 mph), after Hurricane Hunters observed equivalent surface winds and a pressure of 941 mb (27.8 inHg). Around the same time, the JMA estimated peak 10 minute winds of 175 km/h (109 mph).

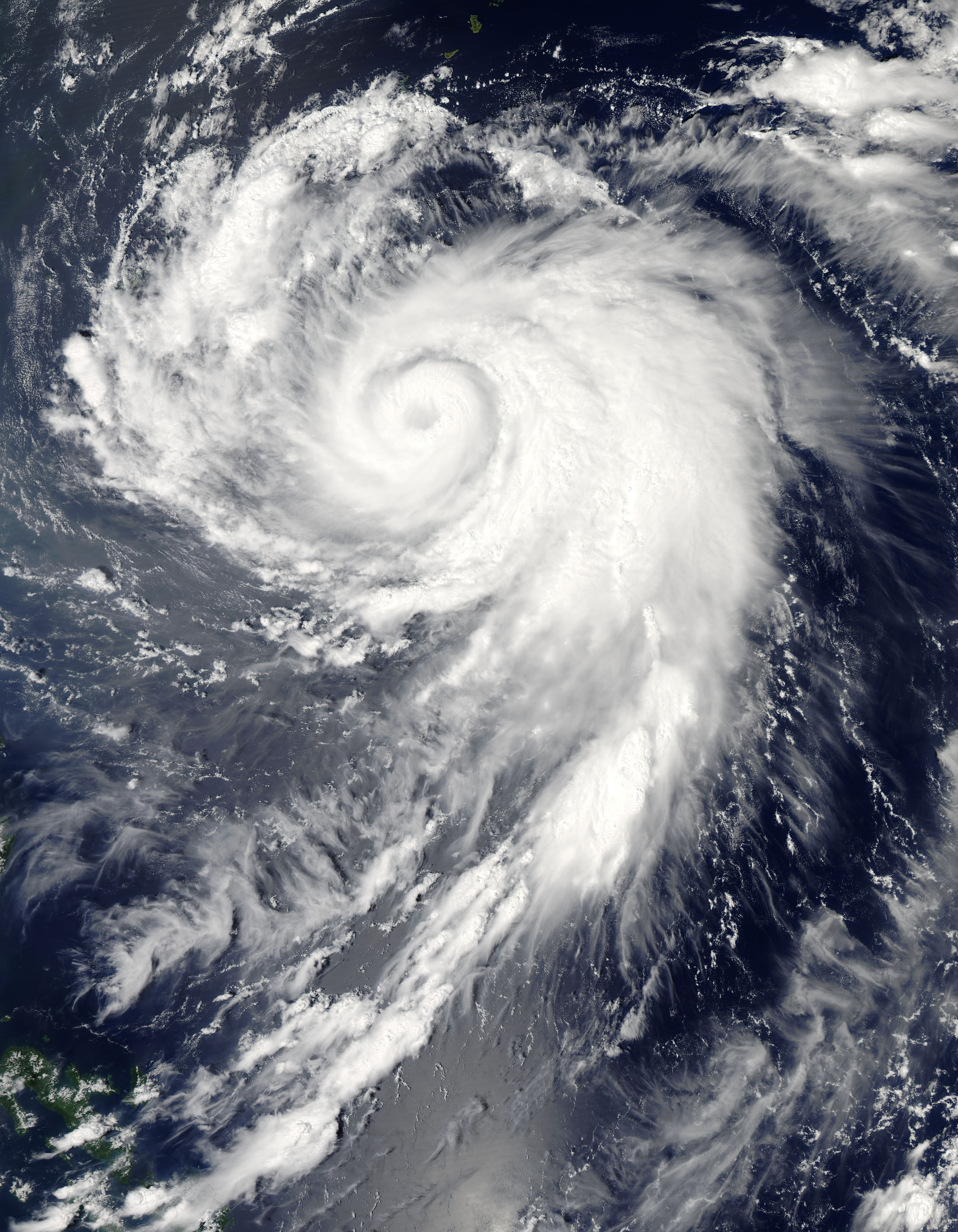
Typhoon Fanapi intensifying on September 17

Early on September 19, Typhoon Fanapi made landfall over eastern Taiwan near Hualien City with winds of 162 km/h (101 mph), according to Taiwan's Central Weather Bureau. The storm subsequently weakened over land, dipping southwestward as convection diminished over the northern portion of the storm. However, the storm resumed its westward trajectory and soon moved over the Taiwan Strait as a severe tropical storm. The thunderstorms reorganized slightly as Fanapi reached open waters, and a nearby ship reported winds of 120 km/h (75 mph). Early on September 20, the storm made a second landfall on southeastern China near Fujian and weakened further over land, although thunderstorms persisted southeast of the circulation along the coast. Fanapi weakened into a tropical depression later that day and dissipated late on September 21.

== Preparations ==
In Taiwan, the threat of Fanapi forced the closure of rail lines and cancellation of flights from Kaohsiung International Airport, and at least 156 flights were canceled. The storm caused the Kaohsiung seaport in southern Taiwan to close, thus delaying shipments from nearby chemical plants. Many boats rode out the storm at port. Portions of the Kaohsiung Mass Rapid Transit system suspended their service, and the Maokong Gondola was shut down during the storm.

Ahead of the storm, officials issued landslide warnings along 61 rivers, and residents in landslide-prone areas were ordered to evacuate. About 10,000 people left their homes in mountainous areas. Hotels were also evacuated, and residents boarded up windows, with schools and businesses closed. Overall, about 150,000 were evacuated due to the storm, with over 7,500 people staying in their houses and requiring assistance to leave after the floods. After the damaging impacts of Typhoon Morakot from the year prior, officials enacted enhanced preparations for Fanapi, including activating over 19,000 emergency workers. Anticipating heavy rainfall, workers at the Tsengwen Reservoir drained waters ahead of the storm. Farmers also rushed to complete harvests, causing a temporary drop in price due to excess supply. The inaugural Yeangder Tournament Players Championship was reduced to a 54-stroke play due to the Typhoon.

The shipping route linking Xiamen, in east China's Fujian Province, and Kinmen (Quemoy), in Taiwan was closed as the typhoon closed in. Chinese officials ordered over 55,000 fishing boats to return to port in Fujian. In Xiamen province north of where Fanapi moved ashore, all kindergarten through middle schools were closed. Across Fujian province, 186,000 people evacuated due to the storm. The Fuzhou Changle International Airport in the province's capital city canceled 37 flights due to the storm. About 78,000 people in low-lying areas of Guangdong left their houses. Oil futures rose in Asia due to the potential for the storm affecting China's offshore oil platforms. While Fanapi was still over Taiwan, the Hong Kong Observatory issued the Number 1 Standby Warning and later upgraded it to a warning Number 3 for Hong Kong. The storm ultimately passed about 150 km (93 mi) north of the territory.

== Impact ==
=== Japan ===
While moving toward Taiwan, Fanapi affected the southernmost islands of Japan, bringing heavy rainfall to Okinawa Prefecture. Ohara recorded 221 mm (8.7 in) of precipitation during the storm's passage. High winds were recorded as well, peaking at 158 km/h (98 mph) at Taketomi, Okinawa. The storm caused flights to be canceled in the Miyako Islands.

=== Taiwan ===
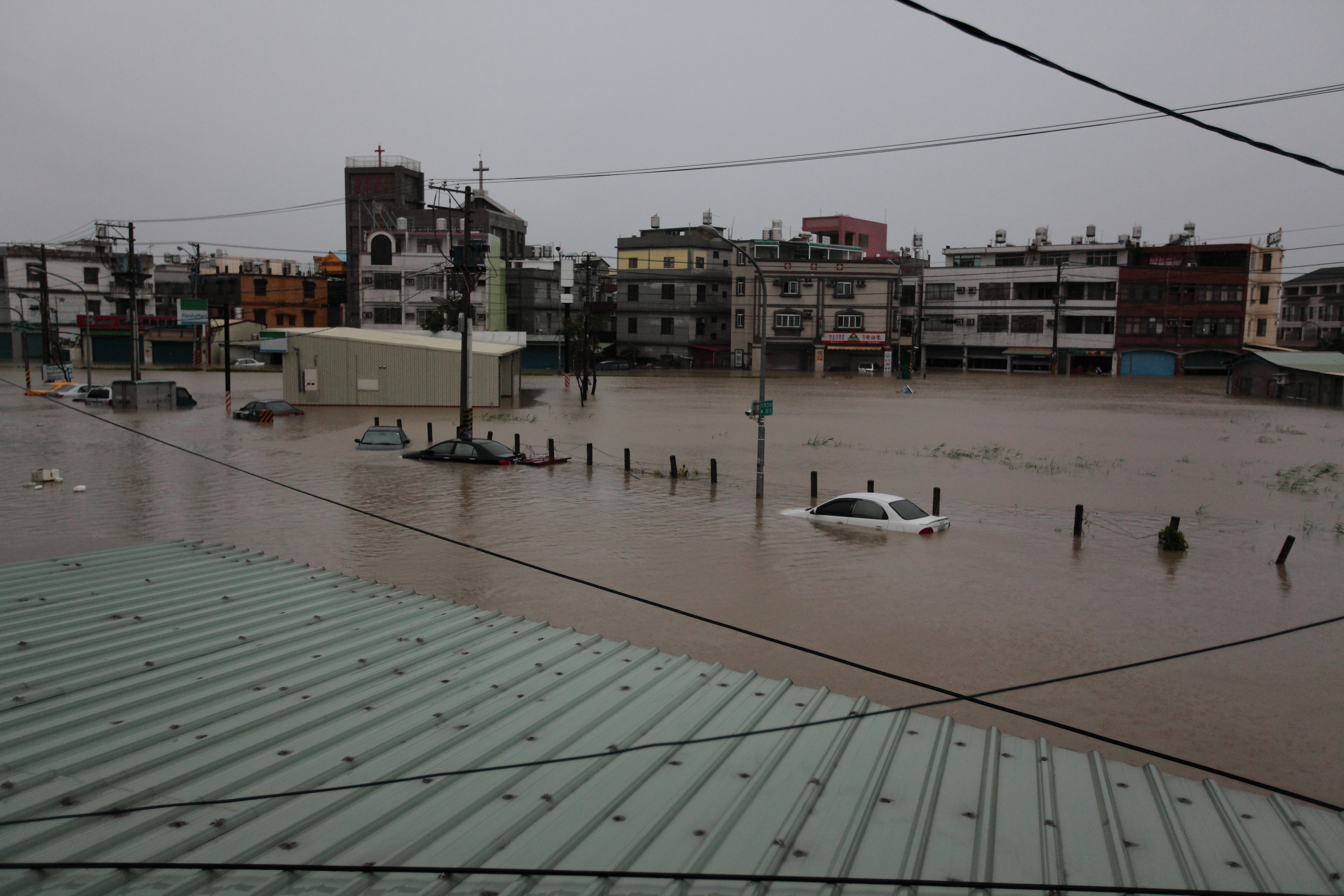
Flood in Kaohsiung, Taiwan caused by the typhoon

By the time Fanapi made landfall, portions of Taiwan reported 300 mm (12 in) of rainfall. Overall rainfall peaked at 1,126 mm (44.3 in) on the island in Majia, Pingtung. These were the heaviest rainfall totals in 10 years in some locations. This led to flooding in the southern portion of the island, with flash flooding occurring in Kaohsiung, the island's second largest city. Rainfall rates there reached 100 mm (3.9 in) per hour at one point, totaling 506 mm (19.9 in); this was the heaviest in 50 years. Several reservoirs were filled to capacity across Taiwan. Wind gusts also reached 220 km/h (140 mph). During the storm, a M_{w}5.2 earthquake struck eastern Taiwan, although it did not cause any additional injuries.

In Kaohsiung, nine of the eleven administrative districts were filled with water. Thousands of homes and vehicles were flooded, reaching over one-story in height. Flooding shut down 10 petrochemical plants in Kaohsiung, causing NT$3 billion (New Taiwan dollar, US$93.75 million) in industrial damage. Also in the city, a nursing home was flooded while residents were inside, forcing firemen and rescuers to evacuate the senior citizens; due to inadequate staffing during the storm, the facility was later shut down. The severe flooding in Kaohsiung resulted from inadequate handling by the sewage system, which was designed to handle 321 mm (12.6 in) of daily precipitation. Flood systems were designed to withstand a 1 in 50 year flood, and the deluge from Fanapi was previously estimated to occur only once every 200 years; after the storm, the government began the process of reviewing the standards.

High winds broke windows across Taiwan, while also knocking down trees and traffic lights. The storm damaged 438 schools, mostly affecting colleges and universities. The passage of Fanapi left about 890,000 homes without power, and another 17,000 without water. Floods also affected 23,470 ha (58,000 acres) of crop fields, mostly to banana plantations. The storm killed 8,791 pigs and 533,000 chickens, and many fish breeding ponds were marred. Agriculture damage was preliminarily estimated at $NT2.12 billion (US$65.27 million). The storm forced 25 roads to be closed, mostly due to debris. The South-Link Line was shut down after a railroad bridge along the Taimali River was washed out. Across Taiwan, 111 people were injured, mainly due to broken glass, and some were blown off motorcycles by high winds. A girl drowned after slipping into the flooded Taoyuan Canal, and a companion attempting to rescue her died as well. One woman drowned after falling into a swollen river while harvesting her crops. These three deaths were not directly related to the storm. The storm directly killed two people – one was due to electrocution in Pingtung County, and the other due to drowning in Tainan County. Overall damage in Taiwan were counted at NT$5 billion (US$158 million).

=== China ===
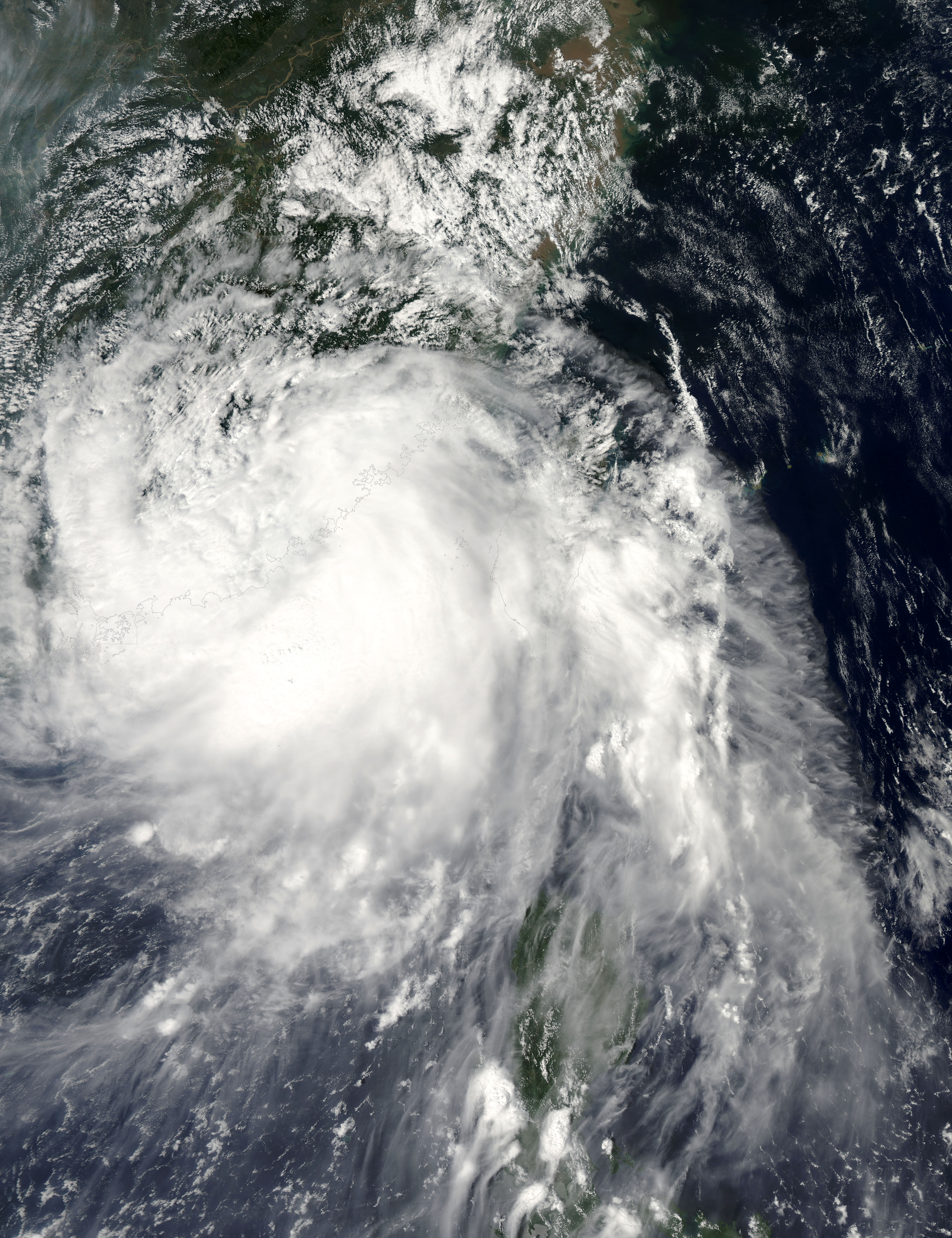
Tropical Storm Fanapi shortly after landfall in China on September 20

The storm brought heavy rainfall to southern China, with six counties in Fujian Province reporting over 200 mm (7.9 in) of precipitation in 23 hours. Rainfall was the heaviest in a century in some portions of Guangdong. Yangchun recorded 548.5 mm (21.59 in) in just seven hours, which broke the daily precipitation record set in 1958. Elsewhere in Guangdong, 24‑hour rainfall reached over 640 mm (25 in).

Moving ashore in Fujian, the high winds from Fanapi knocked over trees and billboards. However, damage was heaviest in neighboring Guangdong, where the storm's heavy rainfall caused widespread mudslides in the western mountainous regions. The landslides cut off traffic between cities, in conjunction with floodwaters. In Xinyi, a storm-related landslide collapsed a dam at a mine, killing 28 people, including four people downstream. The collapse also damaged homes and farms while killing over 100 tons of fish. Damage in the city alone was estimated at ¥460 million (Chinese yuan, US$68.5 million), with 350 houses destroyed. The floods forced about 128,000 people to evacuate in Guangdong, including 18,930 people in Yangchun. Fanapi wrecked 16,000 homes and flooded 66,400 ha (164,000 acres) of crop fields. Throughout Guangdong, Fanapi killed 100 people and provincial damage was counted to be CNY 5.15 billion (US$757.05 million). Total economic losses in Fujian province were counted to be CNY 610 million (US$89.71 million). While passing north of Hong Kong, Fanapi produced thunderstorms and gale-force winds in Hong Kong, with a peak precipitation of 295.5 mm (11.63 in). The rains caused isolated flooding that caused residents in Pok Fu Lam to require rescue. The winds knocked over 47 trees, some of which damaged vehicles, but otherwise damage was minor in the territory.

== Aftermath ==
In response to the Taiwan flooding in Kaohsiung, officials deployed 7,888 troops to the southern portion of the island to assist in rescue and recovery work. Soldiers also set up five medical centers, and utilized amphibious vehicles to rescue people in flooded areas. Taiwan's president Ma Ying-jeou toured the flooded regions on September 23, emphasizing that efforts to drain the flooding should be the main priority. More than 100 buildings in Kaohsiung required water pumps and thousands of volunteers to remove standing water from basements and streets. The mayor Kiku Chen temporarily suspended her reelection campaign due to the floods. About 80% of the factories in Kaohsiung were reopened by September 21. The high crop damage allowed farmers to qualify for low interest loans. Rail lines took two weeks to reopen due to damage. Power and water service was restored within days of the storm, although residents in flooded areas were advised to boil water before usage. There was also an increase in dengue fever after the floods. The Red Cross Society of China donated about US$100,000 in the days after the storm. The government announced on September 20 that families affected by the floods would receive NT$30,000 (US$945.92) per house. Throughout Taiwan, exports during September 2010 decreased 6.9% from August's levels due to the storm and an industrial fire.

In mainland China, officials used helicopters to airdrop relief goods to Guangdong. By three days after the storm, workers distributed 2,000 tents and 1,000 beds. Once the floodwaters dropped, residents returned their homes to clean up the mud and damage. Farm officials in Guangdong used 50 tons of disinfectant to prevent the spread of disease, while the provincial government allocated ¥240 million (CNY, US$35 million) for rebuilding. About 1,000 soldiers worked to clean debris and animal carcasses from the reservoir providing drinking water to Maoming. The collapsed dam in Guangdong was later torn down due to being structurally deficient. Zijin Mining, the owner of the dam, had to sell a mine to pay for compensation and fines related to the incident, which ultimately totaled ¥245 million (CNY, US$38.7 million). After the storm, the Red Cross Society of China provided ¥1 million (CNY, US$148,000) to localities affected hardest by the storm, as well as distributing mosquito nets, water purifiers, food, and clothing.

== Retirement ==
The name Fanapi was retired at the 43rd annual meeting of ESCAP/WMO Typhoon Committee in Jeju, South Korea, in January 2011. In February 2012, the committee selected the name Rai to replace Fanapi on the naming lists. It was first used during the 2016 season, but Rai was also retired after the 2021 Pacific typhoon season and replaced with Sarbul.

== See also ==
- Other tropical cyclones named Inday
- 2010 China floods
- Typhoon Dujuan (2015)
- Typhoon Longwang
- Typhoon Morakot
- Typhoon Meranti (2016)
- Typhoon Megi (2016) - Another typhoon to strike Taiwan as a Category 3 and impacted China afterwards.
- Typhoon Haikui (2023) - A second category 3 typhoon to struck Taiwan and China.
- Typhoon Podul (2025)
