= Typhoon Haikui (2023) =

Pacific typhoon in 2023

Typhoon Haikui (Hanna)
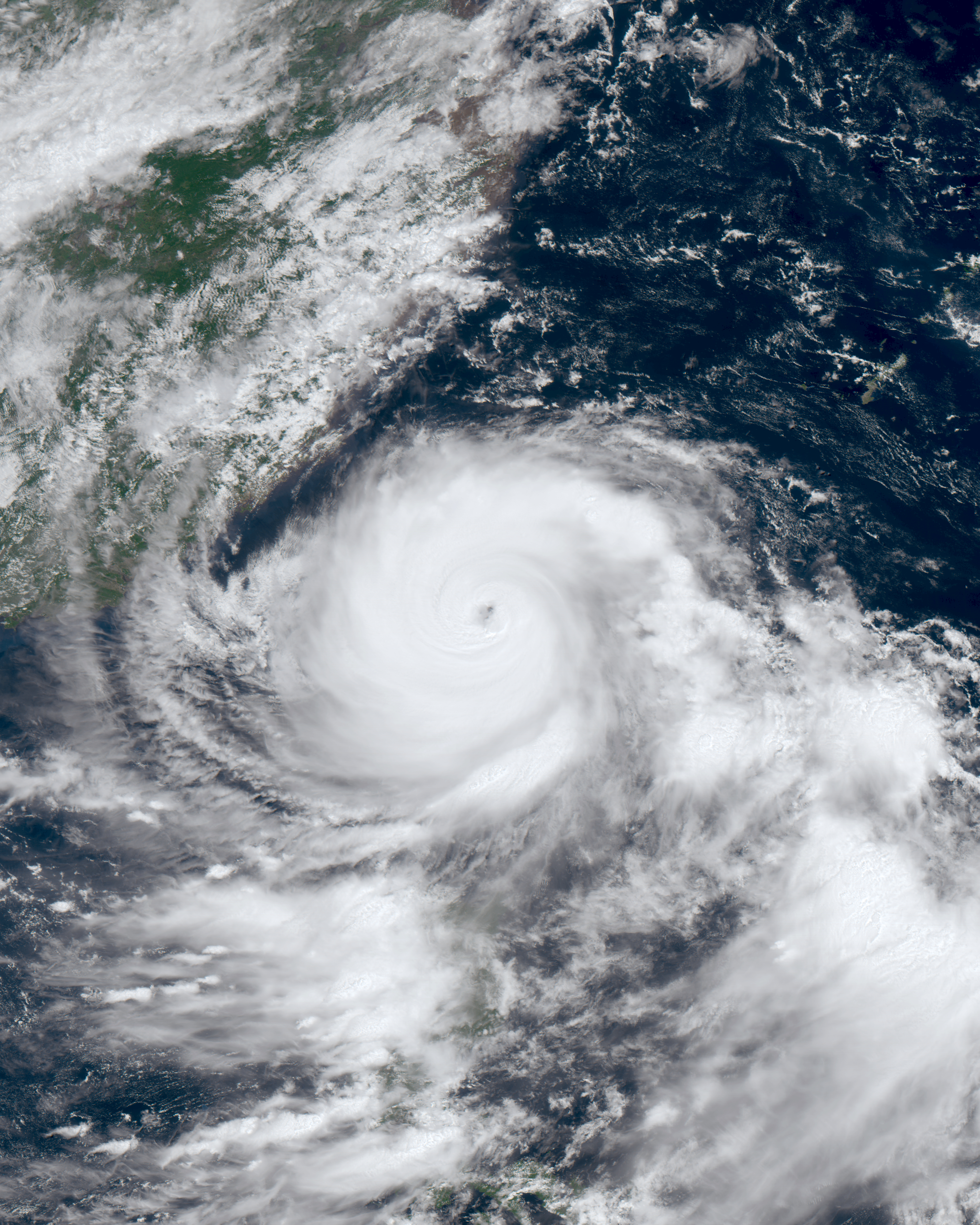
- Typhoon Haikui nearing Taiwan at peak intensity on September 3

Meteorological history
- Formed: August 27, 2023
- Dissipated: September 6, 2023

Very strong typhoon
- 10-minute sustained (JMA)
- Highest winds: 155 km/h (100 mph)
- Lowest pressure: 945 hPa (mbar); 27.91 inHg

Category 3-equivalent typhoon
- 1-minute sustained (SSHWS/JTWC)
- Highest winds: 195 km/h (120 mph)
- Lowest pressure: 945 hPa (mbar); 27.91 inHg

Overall effects
- Fatalities: 16 total
- Injuries: 2 total
- Damage: $2.55 billion (2023 USD)
- Areas affected: Philippines; Taiwan; South China; East China
- IBTrACS
- Part of the 2023 Pacific typhoon season

Typhoon Haikui, (Note: The name Haikui (Mandarin: 海葵, [xaɪ˨˩˦ kʰweɪ˧˥]) was contributed by China and means sea anemone in Mandarin.) known in the Philippines as Typhoon Hanna, was a potent and devastating tropical cyclone that became the first major typhoon to hit Taiwan since Typhoon Megi in 2016 and the first typhoon to do so since Typhoon Nesat in 2017. It also caused serious rainfall in Hong Kong, making it one of the wettest tropical cyclone to affect the region. It is the eleventh tropical storm and eighth typhoon of the 2023 Pacific typhoon season.

Haikui began its life as a broad low-pressure area near the Northern Mariana Islands on August 27. The system intensified to a tropical storm the next day and was named Haikui by the Japan Meteorological Agency (JMA), with the Joint Typhoon Warning Center (JTWC) following suit shortly thereafter; PAGASA then named the same system as Hanna when it entered the Philippine area of responsibility. In the succeeding days, Haikui reached severe tropical storm strength and eventually became a typhoon, before making landfall near Taitung City, Taiwan on September 3.

The remnants of Haikui caused torrential rain in Hong Kong as it stalled over Pearl River Delta, resulting in issuing a Black rainstorm signal for 16 hours, the longest duration ever since the rainstorm warning system was implemented in 1992. Haikui also further enhanced the southwest monsoon in the Philippines, causing extensive rainfall in Luzon. Overall, Haikui caused US$2.55 billion worth of damages throughout its onslaught.

== Meteorological history ==
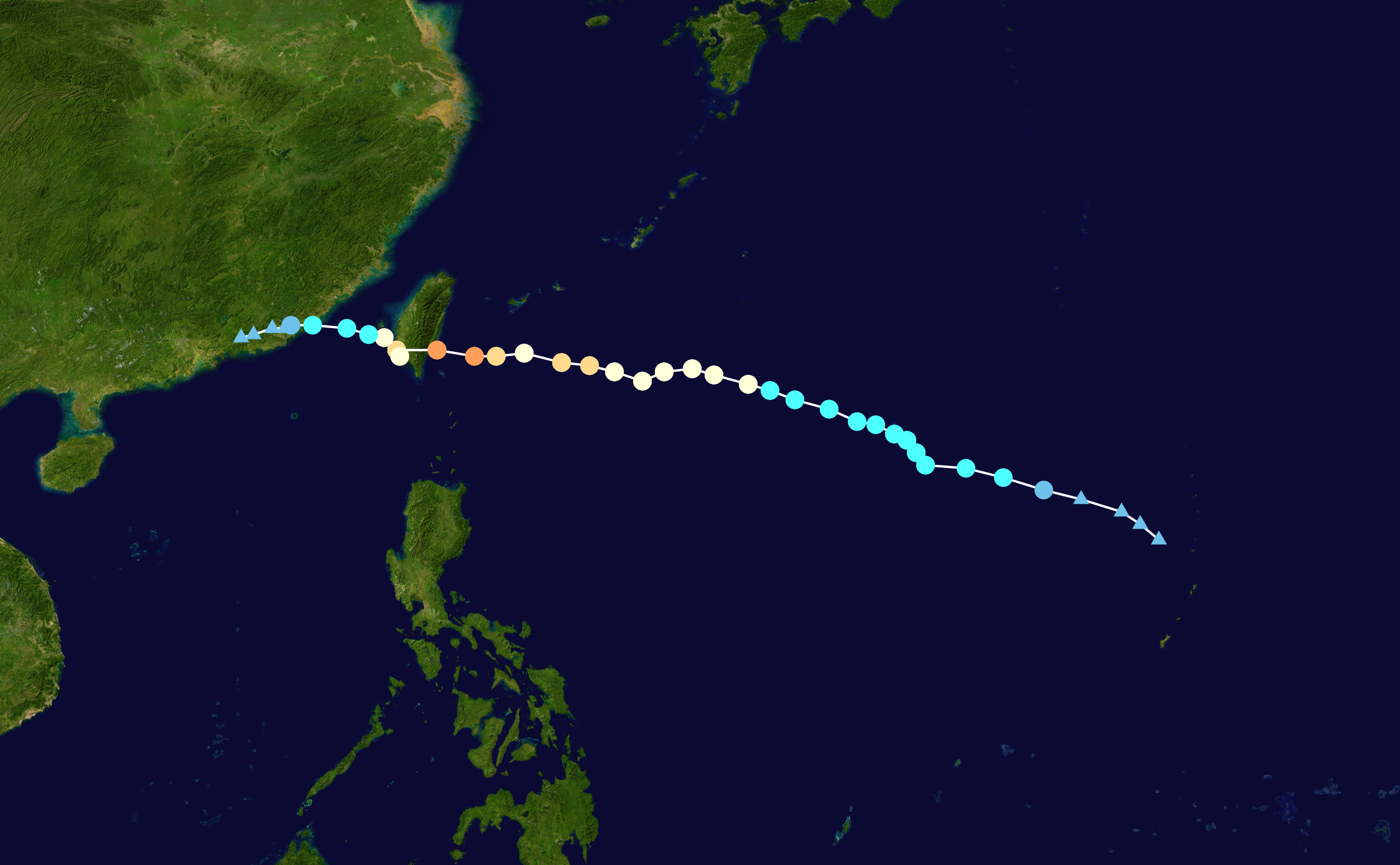
Map plotting the storm's track and intensity, according to the Saffir–Simpson scale Map key Saffir–Simpson scale Tropical depression (≤38 mph, ≤62 km/h) Tropical storm (39–73 mph, 63–118 km/h) Category 1 (74–95 mph, 119–153 km/h) Category 2 (96–110 mph, 154–177 km/h) Category 3 (111–129 mph, 178–208 km/h) Category 4 (130–156 mph, 209–251 km/h) Category 5 (≥157 mph, ≥252 km/h) Unknown Storm type Tropical cyclone Subtropical cyclone Extratropical cyclone, remnant low, tropical disturbance, or monsoon depression

While Typhoon Saola was exhibiting a counterclockwise loop east of the Philippines, a new low-pressure area developed into a tropical depression on August 27 near the Northern Mariana Islands. The depression, which was slowly drifting westward, was subsequently upgraded by the JMA into a tropical storm on August 28, naming it Haikui. The JTWC began initiating advisories thereafter and was designated as 10W. Haikui then rapidly strengthened into the severe tropical storm category a few minutes later. Haikui then moved west-northwest and eventually entered the Philippine area of responsibility at around 21:00 PHT (13:00 UTC) and was promptly assigned the domestic name Hanna.

Haikui then maintained its severe tropical storm status for about a day while moving generally westwards across the Philippine Sea, before finally reaching typhoon status on September 1. Haikui then continued westwards over the Philippine Sea with little change in intensity, but later intensified into a Category 2-equivalent typhoon a day later. Haikui later rapidly strengthened into a strong Category 3 typhoon before making landfall over Taitung County, Taiwan, becoming the first storm to hit mainland Taiwan for the first time in 4 years after Severe Tropical Storm Bailu (Ineng), and the first Category 3+ typhoon to hit the island since Typhoon Megi (Helen) in 2016. The collision between Typhoon Haikui & the mountain ranges of Taiwan considerably wrecked the structure of the storm and made it weaken back into a minimal Category 1 typhoon by the time it exited the landmass of the island in the evening. Haikui then moved erratically over the next few hours, heading eastwards and making a second landfall in Kaohsiung, Taiwan. On September 5, Typhoon Haikui made its third and final landfall along the coast of Dongshan County, Fujian as a weakening tropical storm.

== Preparations and impact ==
=== Philippines ===
Though not making any direct landfall in the Philippines, Typhoon Haikui (locally known as Hanna) enhanced the southwest monsoon along with Typhoon Saola and Tropical Storm Kirogi, causing heavy rainfall and strong winds in many areas especially in Luzon, and causing one death. Classes were suspended in some regions including Metro Manila on September 1 in the wake of the three storms that bring heavy rains and gusty winds throughout the country.

=== Taiwan ===
Typhoon Haikui developing off the eastern coast of Taiwan right before its landfall on September 3.

Before the arrival of the typhoon, 8,000 people were evacuated in the island, particularly also from the mountainous regions that are prone to landslides.

As Haikui made landfall in Taiwan, it unleashed torrential rains and very strong gusty winds. It left 110,000 of households without power. Two people were slightly injured after a tree fell on a truck in Hualien. Although no deaths were reported, parts of the country experience floods, downed trees, and continued rainfall after Haikui made a second landfall. More than 217,000 households lost electricity in line with the typhoon. Haikui resulted in NTD600 million (US$18.2 million) in agricultural losses.

=== Mainland China ===
On September 5, Typhoon Haikui made landfall along the coast of Dongshan County, Fujian. A heavy rainstorm occurred in the coastal areas of Fujian, causing the death of two firefighters. Economic losses in Fujian amounted to ¥5 billion (US$683 million). Total damage in China reached 15.83 billion yuan (US$2.31 billion).

Land and sea transportation in Guangdong and Huizhou had been suspended due to widespread floods and typhoon prevention. Classes had also been suspended in the cities of Shantou and Chaozhou.

=== Hong Kong ===
Wettest tropical cyclones and their remnants Hong Kong Highest-known totals
Precipitation			Storm	Location	Ref.
Rank	mm	in	Storm	Location	Ref.
1	632.0	24.90	Haikui 2023	Hong Kong Observatory	
2	616.5	24.27	Sam 1999	Hong Kong Observatory	
3	597.0	23.50	July 1926 Typhoon	Royal Observatory, Hong Kong	
4	562.0	22.13	June 1916 Typhoon	Royal Observatory, Hong Kong	
5	530.7	20.89	Agnes 1965	Royal Observatory, Hong Kong	
6	519.0	20.43	Agnes 1978	Royal Observatory, Hong Kong	
7	516.1	20.32	Ellen 1976	Royal Observatory, Hong Kong	
8	497.5	19.59	Dot 1993	Royal Observatory, Hong Kong	
9	491.7	19.36	Dot 1982	Royal Observatory, Hong Kong	
10	480.9	18.93	Helen 1995	Royal Observatory, Hong Kong	

A low-pressure system associated with Haikui caused flooding in Hong Kong from September 7 to September 8. On September 7, Sha Tau Kok in the North District had already recorded more than 70 millimetres (2.8 in) rainfall by 7 pm, which the Hong Kong Observatory issued a flood warning for Northern New Territories at 7:50 pm. Heavy rainfall then spread to the entirety of the city, and the weather bureau issued the Amber rainstorm signal, which was then upgraded to the Red signal in less than half an hour. At 11:05 pm, the highest warning level, Black rainstorm signal, was issued due to continued worsening situations. It was the first time the warning was issued in two years. It caused three fatalities.

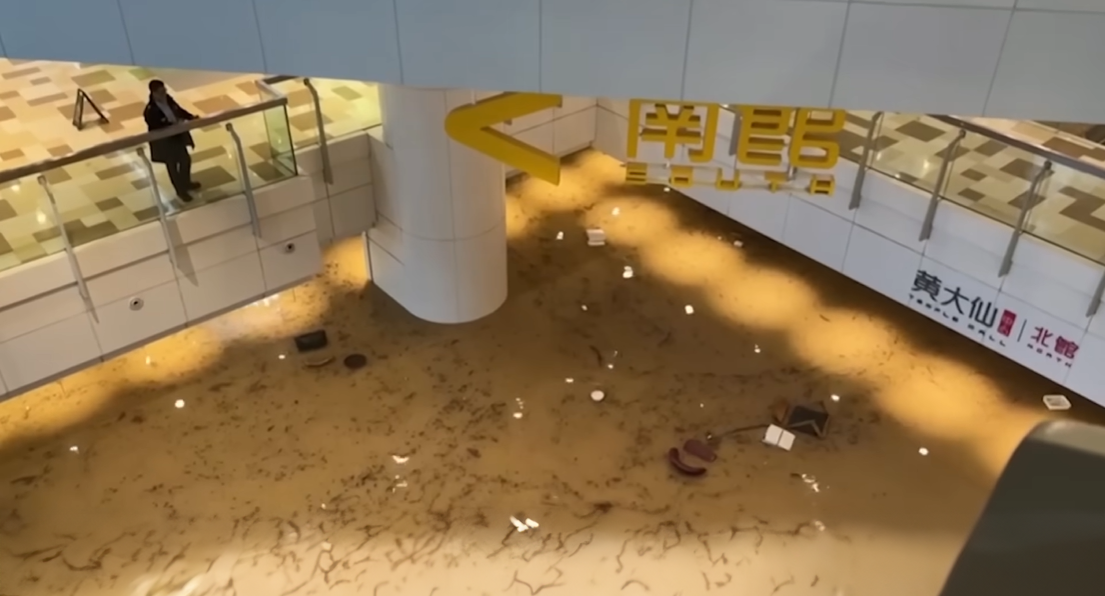
Ground level of a shopping mall in Wong Tai Sin submerged by water

The torrential rainfall continued overnight and into the morning of 8 September, gradually subsiding by afternoon. The Black Rainstorm signal lasted over 16 hours, the longest duration ever since the rainstorm warning system was implemented in 1992. The HKO headquarters accumulated over 632 millimetres (24.9 in) of rainfall within 24 hours, a 24-hour rainfall rate trailing only the record set in May 1889. This also makes Typhoon Haikui the wettest storm in Hong Kong's history, breaking the record of Severe Tropical Storm Sam in 1999. Meanwhile, parts of Hong Kong Island, including Stanley, Chai Wan, Shau Kei Wan and North Point accumulated over 800 millimetres (31 in) of rainfall within just 12 hours, the area around Tai Tam even accumulated over 900 millimetres (35 in). Total economic losses amounted to HK$1.74 billion (US$223 million).

== Retirement ==
Due to extensive damage it caused in China, the Typhoon Committee announced that the name Haikui, along with two others, will be removed from the naming lists and will never be used again as a typhoon name. In 2025, the name replaced with Tianma, which refers to a mythical winged horse in Mandarin.

== See also ==
- Weather of 2023
- Tropical cyclones in 2023
- Typhoon Bilis (2000)
- Typhoon Talim (2005)
- Typhoon Longwang (2005)
- Typhoon Morakot (2009)
- Typhoon Fanapi (2010)
- Typhoon Soulik (2013)
- Typhoon Soudelor (2015)
- Typhoon Dujuan (2015)
- Typhoon Megi (2016)
- Typhoon Nesat (2017)
- Typhoon Koinu (2023) – Another typhoon that made landfall in Taiwan just a month after Haikui
- Typhoon Gaemi (2024) – A typhoon that stalled off the coast and made landfall at the same intensity as Haikui
- Typhoon Danas (2025) – Had a similar track to Haikui.
- Typhoon Podul (2025)
