= 2023 Hong Kong rainstorm and floods =

September 2023 disaster in Hong Kong

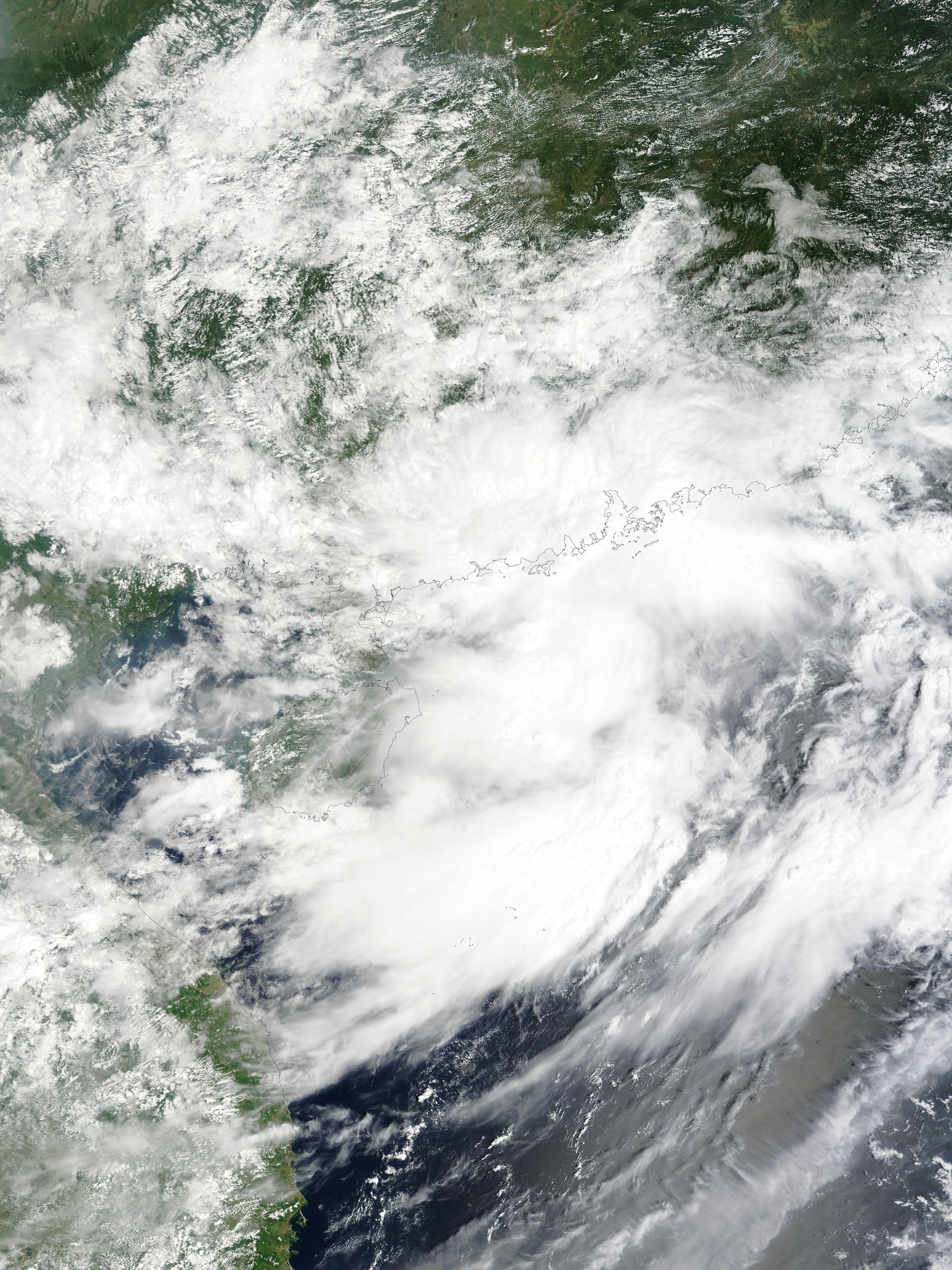
- Low pressure system of former typhoon Haikui, affecting the Pearl River Delta area
- Cause: Low pressure trough of residual Typhoon Haikui

Meteorological history
- Duration: 7–8 September 2023

Flood
- Max. rainfall: 158.1 millimetres (6.22 in) hourly

Overall effects
- Fatalities: 15 (4 in Hong Kong, 11 in Guangxi)
- Injuries: 144 (Hong Kong) 1 indirectly (Hong Kong)
- Economic losses: HK$100 million
- Areas affected: Hong Kong, Macau, and the southern coast of China

In the evening of 7 September 2023, a heavy rainstorm struck the territory of Hong Kong and the Pearl River Delta area, including parts of Guangdong, China, and Macau. The record rainfall caused widespread flooding and landslides in the cities, four dead and dozens injured.

== History ==
On 5 September 2023, Typhoon Haikui made landfall in China's Fujian province, subsequently moving into Guangdong, before its remnants stalled over the Pearl River Delta for over two days. The low-pressure trough associated with Haikui's remnants interacted with the southwest monsoon.

By 7 pm on 7 September, Sha Tau Kok in the North District recorded more than 70 millimetres (2.8 in) rainfall. Hong Kong Observatory (HKO) issued a flood warning for Northern New Territories at 7:50 pm. Heavy rainfall then spread to the entire territory, forcing the HKO to issue the Amber rainstorm signal, and later the Red signal in less than half an hour. At 11:05 pm, the highest warning level, Black rainstorm signal, was issued due to worsening situations. It was the first time the warning was issued in two years.

According to the HKO, between 11:00 p.m. of 7 September and 12:00 a.m, of 8 September, the HKO headquarters recorded 158.1 millimetres (6.22 in) mm of rainfall within one hour, the highest hourly rainfall rate ever in Hong Kong since records began in 1884.

The torrential rainfall continued overnight and into the morning of 8 September, gradually subsiding by afternoon. The Black rainstorm signal lasted over 16 hours, the longest duration ever since the rainstorm warning system was implemented in 1992. The HKO headquarters accumulated over 632 millimetres (24.9 in) of rainfall within 24 hours, a 24-hour rainfall rate trailing only the record set in May 1889. This also makes Typhoon Haikui the wettest storm in Hong Kong's history, breaking the record of Severe Tropical Storm Sam in 1999. Meanwhile, parts of Hong Kong Island, including Stanley, Chai Wan, Shau Kei Wan and North Point accumulated over 800 millimetres (31 in) of rainfall within just 12 hours, the area around Tai Tam even accumulated over 900 millimetres (35 in).

== Impact ==
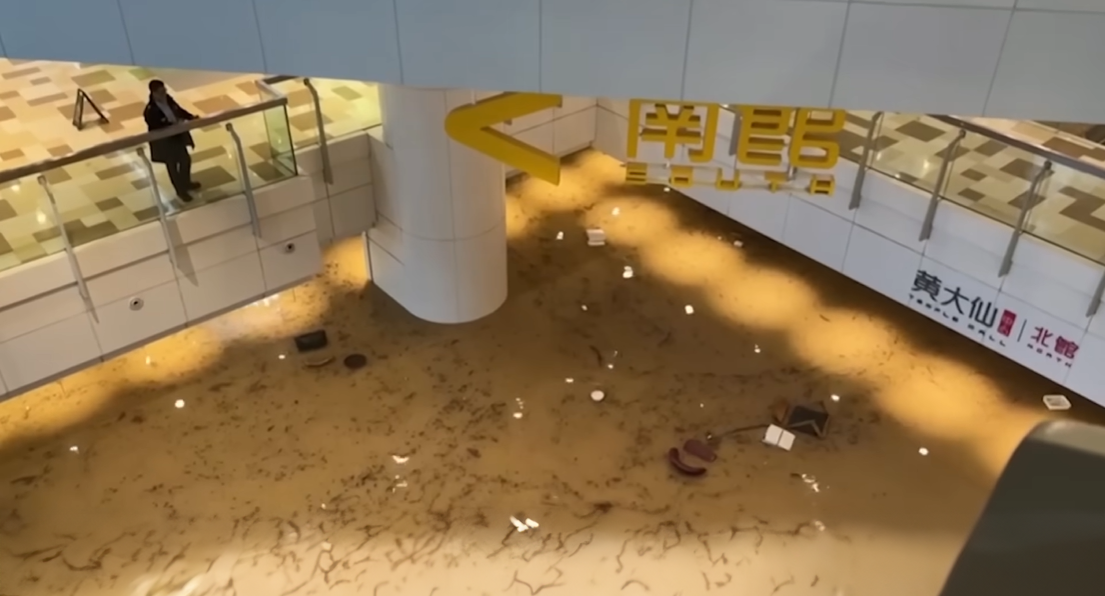
Ground level of a shopping mall in Wong Tai Sin submerged by water

Flooding was reported across the territory, with Wong Tai Sin one of the hardest hit places. Shopping centres on Lung Cheung Road and Wong Tai Sin station became flooded, with water rushing down exit staircases and escalators into the station concourse. The Kwun Tong line was partly closed due to severe flooding in the railway tunnel.

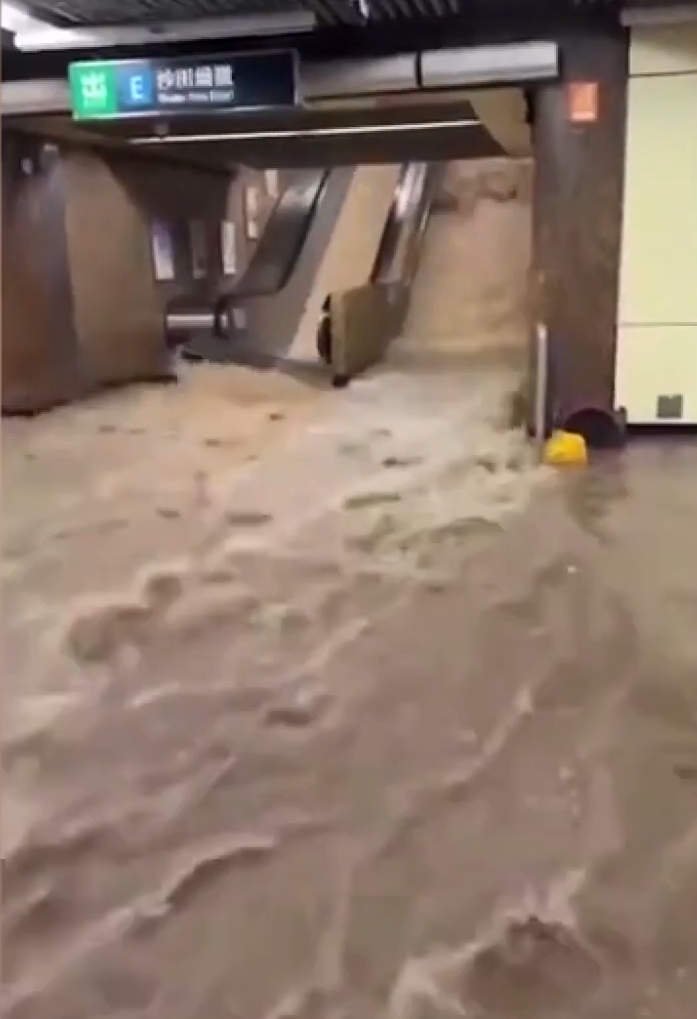
Flooding in Wong Tai Sin station

Vehicles were trapped due to the widespread flooding, including a flooded bus in Chai Wan on Hong Kong Island. In some parts of New Territories, chest-deep water forced residents to flee villages.

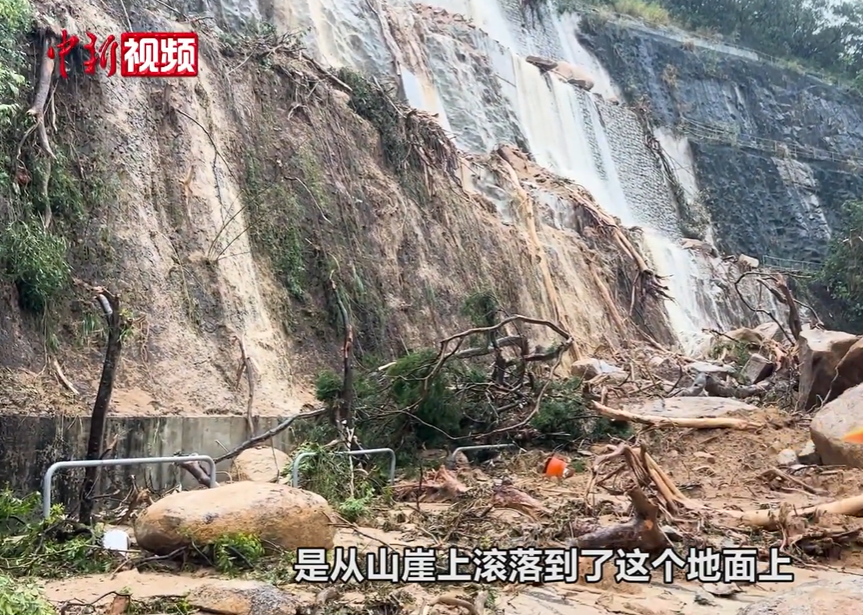
Landslide in Shau Kei Wan saw bus-size boulders falling

As the downpour continued, landslides rocked the territory. In the neighbourhood of Shau Kei Wan, boulders as large as a bus tumbled down a section of the road, some 50 meters of the road was completely covered with mud and rocks standing up to three meters high. Luxury houses in Redhill Peninsula near Tai Tam Bay were also exposed with illegal structures following the soil slip. Ruptures of underground water pipe created sinkholes in several part of the territory, causing minibus and car plunging into the holes.

Shek O and another nearby coastal village were isolated for a day due to a collapsed section of the Shek O Road.

== Controversies ==
=== Reservoir discharge ===
The Hong Kong Government released a brief statement sixteen minutes into Friday, confirming the Shenzhen Reservoir will discharge water from about midnight, and warned that "[t]here may be a risk of flooding in some parts of the New Territories". The discharge began at 12.15 a.m., whilst villagers scrambled to prepare and battle the torrential rain. Chris Tang, the Security Secretary, claimed the widespread flooding "seemed to have no direct correlation with the water discharge from Shenzhen". Villagers living near the Sham Chun River questioned Tang as neck-deep river water engulfed the houses after the discharge.

=== Government's response ===
As flooding persisted into the morning, all schools in the territory had to be shut down on 8 September. However, the Government only "reminded" employers that all non-essential employees "should not be required to report for duty", under a non-binding "extreme conditions" announcement unlike arrangements for typhoons.

The Hong Kong Government first described the historic rainfall as "once-in-a-century", but then upgraded the narrative to "once-in-500-years", or a 0.2% chance. It caused uproar from the public as an attempt to deflect the blame, after the authorities were questioned and criticised for the preparedness for such an emergency. Observers and critics attacked the government’s response for "too little, too late", while lawmakers and analysts urged the government to carry out a full review of the emergency system and capabilities.

== See also ==
- Hong Kong rainstorm warning signals
- Climate of Hong Kong

Other recent severe rainstorm events in China:

- 2020 China floods
- 2021 Henan floods — severe flooding caused by Typhoon In-fa
- 2023 North China floods — severe flooding caused by Typhoon Doksuri, which occurred more than a month prior
