= Typhoon Megi (2016) =

Pacific typhoon in 2016

Typhoon Megi (Helen)
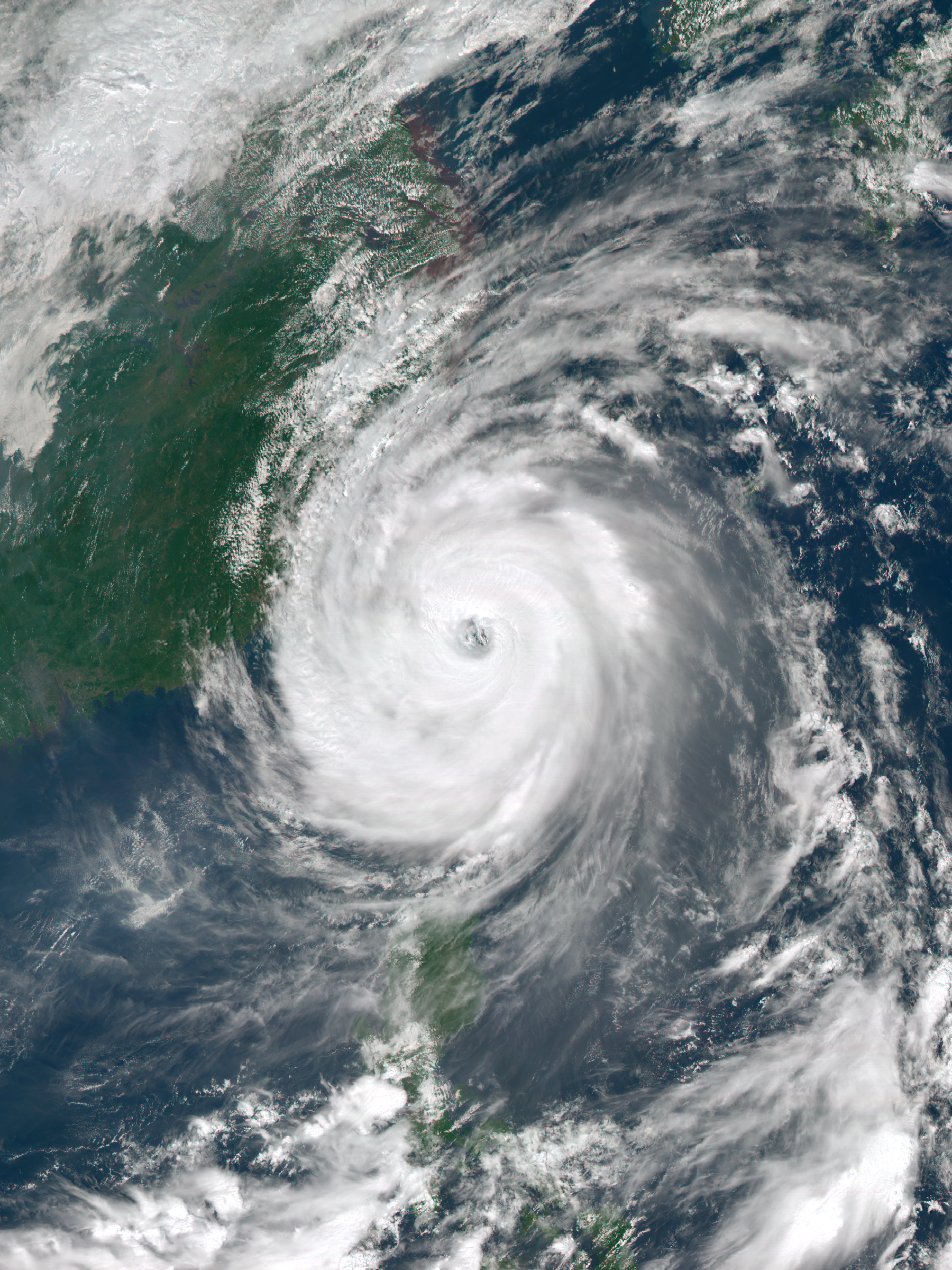
- Typhoon Megi making landfall in Taiwan at peak intensity on September 27

Meteorological history
- Formed: September 22, 2016
- Dissipated: September 29, 2016

Very strong typhoon
- 10-minute sustained (JMA)
- Highest winds: 155 km/h (100 mph)
- Lowest pressure: 945 hPa (mbar); 27.91 inHg

Category 4-equivalent typhoon
- 1-minute sustained (SSHWS/JTWC)
- Highest winds: 220 km/h (140 mph)
- Lowest pressure: 933 hPa (mbar); 27.55 inHg

Overall effects
- Fatalities: 52 total
- Damage: $1.56 billion (2016 USD)
- Areas affected: Caroline Islands, Ryukyu Islands, Taiwan, South and East China
- IBTrACS
- Part of the 2016 Pacific typhoon season

Typhoon Megi, (Note: The name Megi (Korean: 메기, [ˈme̞(ː)ɡi]) was contributed by South Korea and refers to the Amur catfish (Silurus asotus) in Korean.) known in the Philippines as Typhoon Helen, was a large and powerful tropical cyclone which affected Taiwan and eastern China in late September 2016. It is the seventeenth named storm and the seventh typhoon of the annual typhoon season. Megi started as a tropical disturbance in the northeast of Pohnpei. On September 21, JMA upgraded the disturbance to a tropical depression. The depression was immediately named Megi by the JMA as it was classified as a tropical storm. It was later then designated by JTWC as a newly formed Tropical Depression 20W. Moving northwestwards, Megi was trying to form an eye which prompted the agencies to upgrade into a typhoon. Megi later entered PAR, attaining the name Helen as it continued to intensify. Favorable conditions and low vertical wind shear allow Megi to perform an eyewall replacement cycle as it approaches Taiwan.

On September 26, Megi has reached its 1-minute winds of 220 km/h (140 mph) and a central pressure of 933 hPa (27.55 inHg). The typhoon later made landfall at Hualien City in Taiwan around 14:00 NST (06:00 UTC). The interaction with the high mountains result Megi to weaken significantly and emerge through Taiwan Strait. On September 28, Megi made its final landfall in Hui'an County, Fujian as a weakening severe tropical storm. Rapid weakening has ensued as it moved inland. Megi later dissipated on the next day.

== Meteorological history ==
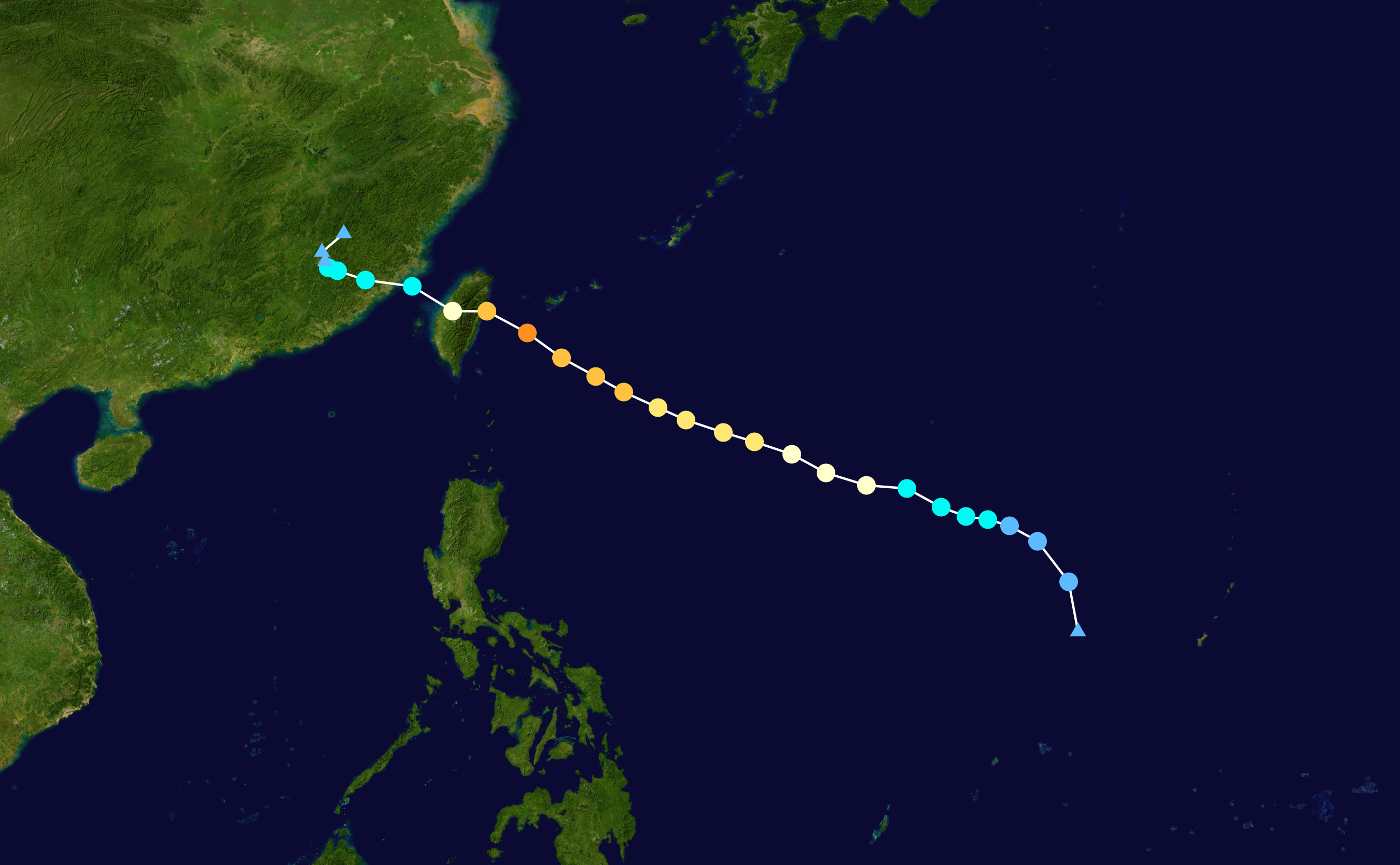
Map plotting the storm's track and intensity, according to the Saffir–Simpson scale Map key Saffir–Simpson scale Tropical depression (≤38 mph, ≤62 km/h) Tropical storm (39–73 mph, 63–118 km/h) Category 1 (74–95 mph, 119–153 km/h) Category 2 (96–110 mph, 154–177 km/h) Category 3 (111–129 mph, 178–208 km/h) Category 4 (130–156 mph, 209–251 km/h) Category 5 (≥157 mph, ≥252 km/h) Unknown Storm type Tropical cyclone Subtropical cyclone Extratropical cyclone, remnant low, tropical disturbance, or monsoon depression

A tropical disturbance formed northeast of Pohnpei on September 19. Two days later, the Japan Meteorological Agency (JMA) upgraded the low-pressure area to a tropical depression early on September 21, and the Joint Typhoon Warning Center (JTWC) also issued a Tropical Cyclone Formation Alert shortly after that; however, the low-level circulation center (LLCC) of that disorganized system was exposed with fragmented convection. The JMA upgraded the system to a tropical storm and named it Megi early on September 23, when the JTWC also indicated that the monsoonal circulation had consolidated, resulting in upgrading it to a tropical depression but lacking of a definitive center. Six hours later, the JTWC upgraded Megi to a tropical storm. When formative banding and cloud tops were improving and cooling late on the same day, the JMA further upgraded the broad system to a severe tropical storm.

Tracking along the southwestern periphery of the deep-layered subtropical ridge on September 24, Megi was trying to form an eye that prompted both of the JMA and then the JTWC upgrading it to a typhoon. It also received the name Helen from PAGASA as the system entered the Philippine Area of Responsibility on the same day. However, despite being under excellent environmental conditions, Megi stopped intensifying further since September 25. Located in an area of low vertical wind shear and above warm sea surface temperatures near 30°C, diurnal weakening of convection still continued to occur, especially over the northern half of the system. With excellent radial outflow tapping into westerlies and a large tropical upper tropospheric trough (TUTT) cell to the east, a defined eye remained absent from the typhoon. After completing an eyewall replacement cycle on September 26, Megi eventually started to strengthen more in the afternoon, resulting in a ragged but larger eye embedded in this large typhoon. The JMA indicated that Megi had reached its peak intensity at 18:00 UTC, with ten-minute maximum sustained winds at 155 km/h (100 mph) and the central pressure at 940 hPa (27.76 inHg).

Megi's large eye was temporarily more defined early on September 27; however it soon became cloud-filled as the typhoon had approached the eastern coast of Taiwan. Shortly before Megi made landfall over Hualien City at 14:00 NST (06:00 UTC), it had already intensified into a stronger typhoon at around 03:00 UTC, with one-minute maximum sustained winds at 220 km/h (140 mph) indicated by the JTWC, equivalent to Category 4 of the Saffir–Simpson hurricane wind scale. Subsequently, interaction with the high mountains of Taiwan caused Megi to weaken significantly and the typhoon emerged into the Taiwan Strait from Mailiao at 21:10 NST (13:10 UTC). At 04:40 CST on September 28 (20:40 UTC on September 27), Megi made landfall over Hui'an County, Fujian as a minimal typhoon.

== Impact ==
=== Taiwan ===
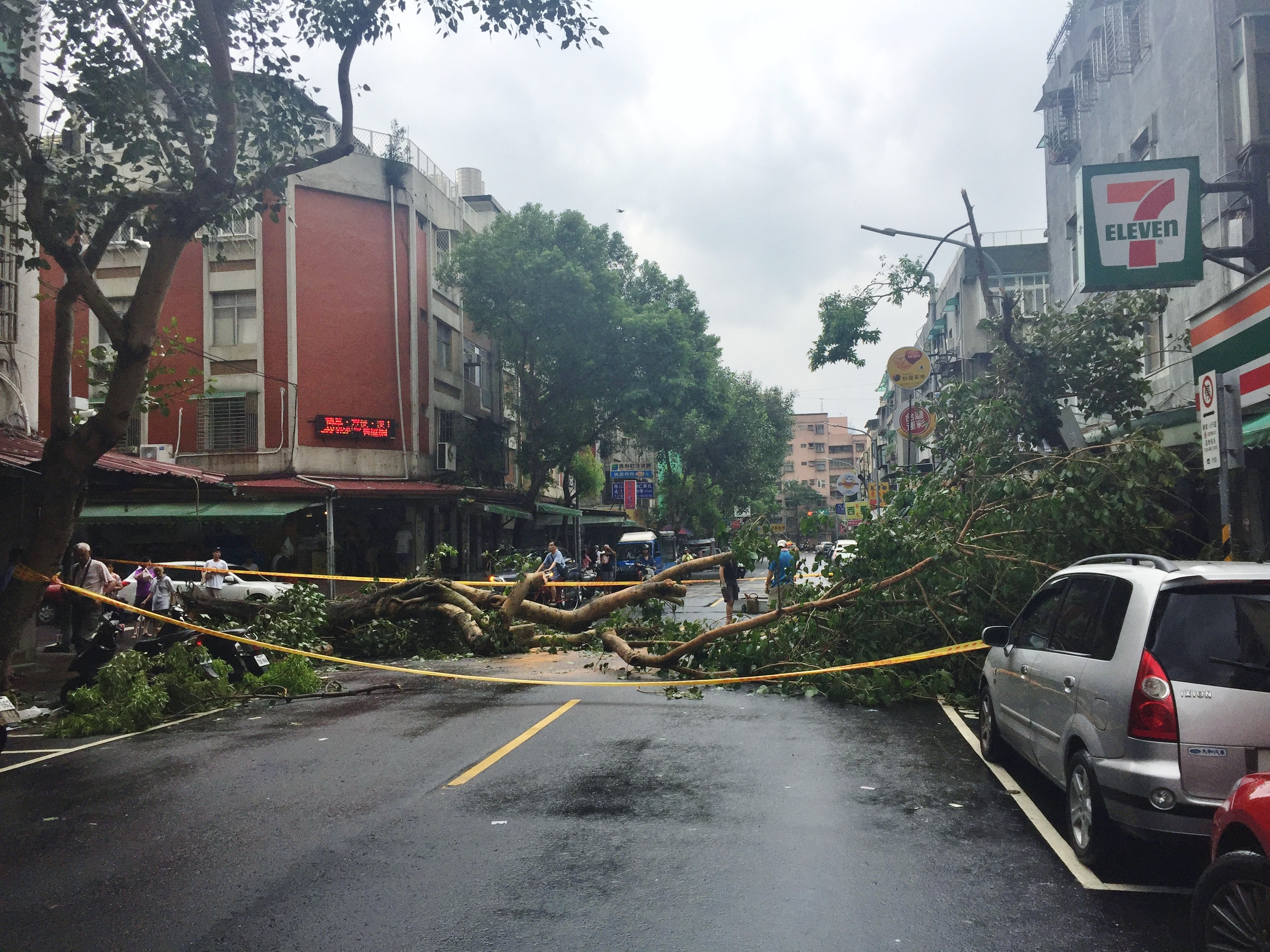
Damage from the storm in Taipei

Megi left 3.89 million households without power as it made landfall in Taiwan, the second worst blackout in history after Typhoon Soudelor's record-breaking 4.85 million households in August 2015. The storm forced more than 14,000 people to evacuate from mountainous areas near the coast to government shelters. At least four were killed across Taiwan, while 625 others were injured, including 8 Japanese tourists whose bus overturned. More than 400 flights were cancelled, while train services were also halted during the passage of Megi. By October 1 the death toll in Taiwan had risen to 8 - five due to indirect causes, such as falls and traffic accidents, and three people who died when a landslide destroyed their house in southern Kaohsiung County.

Early estimates suggested Taiwan's agricultural sector suffered losses of NT$1.03 billion (US$31.9 million), with around 19,000 hectares of crops damaged in total. By September 29 the total amount of damages in the agricultural sector had risen to NT$1.31 billion (US$42 million), with Yunlin County in western Taiwan accounting for more than a quarter of all of them. Government officials also announced that 814 school campuses across Taiwan were damaged, at an estimated cost of NT$161 million (US$4.17 million). In all, 8 people were killed in Taiwan, and total economic losses were counted to be NT$3.36 billion (US$106.9 million).

=== Mainland China ===
The typhoon left at least one person dead as it made landfall in Fujian, while 27 others were missing after a massive landslide engulfed part of a village in the eastern Zhejiang Province, swallowing up dozens of houses. By September 30 the death toll had risen to at least 4, as rescuers in Sucun village, Suichang County, pulled three bodies from the rubble of collapsed houses. A total of 20 houses were buried, while 17 others were flooded in Sucun, as an estimated 400,000 cubic meters slid down the mountainside. At least 15 people were rescued there, while 26 others remained missing, in addition to 6 people in nearby Baofang. The death toll in mainland China had risen to at least 16 by October 5, as authorities were still trying to locate 17 missing persons in Sucun.

Xinhua News Agency reported that more than 120,000 people were evacuated by Fujian authorities, while the province's 31,700 fishing boats were recalled to port. China Southern Airlines cancelled several dozen flights due to the approaching storm. More than 1,200 houses were destroyed and over 10,000 were damaged during the passage of Megi, which affected an estimated 209 million people. In all, 44 people were killed in mainland China, and total damages were amounted to CNY9.7 billion (US$1.45 billion).

== See also ==
- Weather of 2016
- Tropical cyclones in 2016
- Typhoon Talim (Isang; 2005) – a strong Category 4 typhoon.
- Typhoon Longwang (Maring; 2005) – a strong Category 4 super typhoon that struck Taiwan in 2005.
- Typhoon Soudelor (Hanna; 2015) – a powerful Category 5 super typhoon that gravely affected the Mariana Islands and Taiwan in 2015.
- Typhoon Dujuan (Jenny; 2015) – a strong Category 4 super typhoon that struck Taiwan just months after Soudelor.
- Typhoon Meranti (Ferdie; 2016) – a powerful Category 5 super typhoon that struck the Batanes and Southern Taiwan.
- Typhoon Haikui (Hanna; 2023) – a strong Category 3 storm that ended Taiwan's typhoon drought after 4 years.
- Typhoon Koinu (Jenny; 2023) – a powerful Category 4 tropical cyclone that traversed over the tip of Taiwan just after 2 months after Haikui
- Typhoon Gaemi (Carina; 2024) – a strong Category 4 typhoon that stalled off the coast before making landfall in Taiwan.
- Typhoon Kong-rey (Leon; 2024) – a powerful Category 4 super typhoon that became the latest Pacific typhoon on record to hit Taiwan.
