= Typhoon Longwang =

Pacific typhoon in 2005

Typhoon Longwang (Maring)
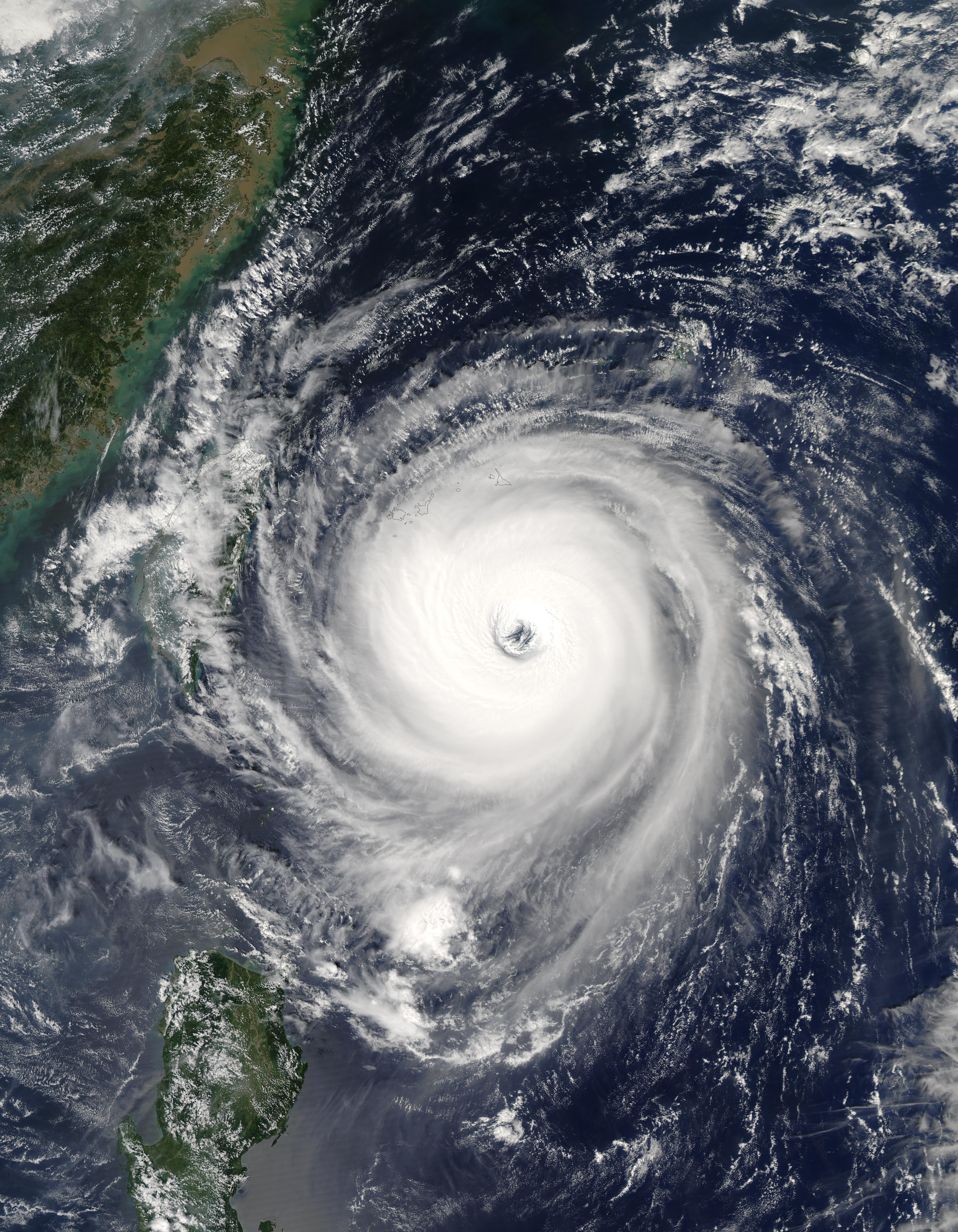
- Typhoon Longwang at peak intensity on October 1

Meteorological history
- Formed: September 25, 2005
- Dissipated: October 3, 2005

Very strong typhoon
- 10-minute sustained (JMA)
- Highest winds: 175 km/h (110 mph)
- Lowest pressure: 930 hPa (mbar); 27.46 inHg

Category 4-equivalent typhoon
- 1-minute sustained (SSHWS/JTWC)
- Highest winds: 230 km/h (145 mph)
- Lowest pressure: 916 hPa (mbar); 27.05 inHg

Overall effects
- Fatalities: 149 total
- Damage: $963 million (2005 USD)
- Areas affected: Ryukyu Islands, Taiwan, East China, and the Batanes
- IBTrACS
- Part of the 2005 Pacific typhoon season

Typhoon Longwang, known in the Philippines as Typhoon Maring, was the deadliest tropical cyclone to impact China during the 2005 Pacific typhoon season. Longwang was first identified as a tropical depression on September 25 north of the Mariana Islands. Moving along a general westward track, the system quickly intensified and reached typhoon status on September 27. After reaching Category 4-equivalent intensity on the Saffir–Simpson hurricane scale, adverse atmospheric conditions along with internal structural changes resulted in temporary weakening. The structural change culminated in Longwang becoming an annular typhoon and prompted re-intensification. The storm attained peak strength with winds of 175 km/h (109 mph) (Note: All wind speeds are in ten-minute sustained standards unless otherwise noted.) and a pressure of 930 mbar (hPa; 27.46 inHg) on October 1 as it approached Taiwan. Interaction with the mountainous terrain of the island and further structural changes caused some weakening before the typhoon made landfall near Hualien City early on October 2. Crossing the island in six hours, Longwang emerged over the Taiwan Strait before moving onshore again later that day, this time in Fujian Province, China as a minimal typhoon. Once over mainland China, the storm quickly weakened and ultimately dissipated late on October 3.

Prior to the storm's arrival, officials in Taiwan activated all emergency operations centers and urged residents to take serious precautions. The storm brought record-breaking winds, peaking at 234 km/h (145 mph) in Hualien City, and torrential rains. Despite the intensity of the storm, damage was relatively limited there. Two people died, 73 were injured, and damage reached NT$570 million (US$17.7 million). (Note: All damage totals are in 2005 values of their respective currencies.) Large-scale evacuations took place in mainland China, with 730,000 people relocating. Losses were extensive in Fujian Province where 1-in-100 year rains caused disastrous flooding in Fuzhou, killing 62 people. In Minhou County, 85 paramilitary police perished when a landslide destroyed their barracks. Throughout China, 147 people were killed and damage amounted to 7.81 billion RMB (US$944.6 million). Due to the severe damage, the name Longwang was later retired and replaced by Haikui.

== Meteorological history ==
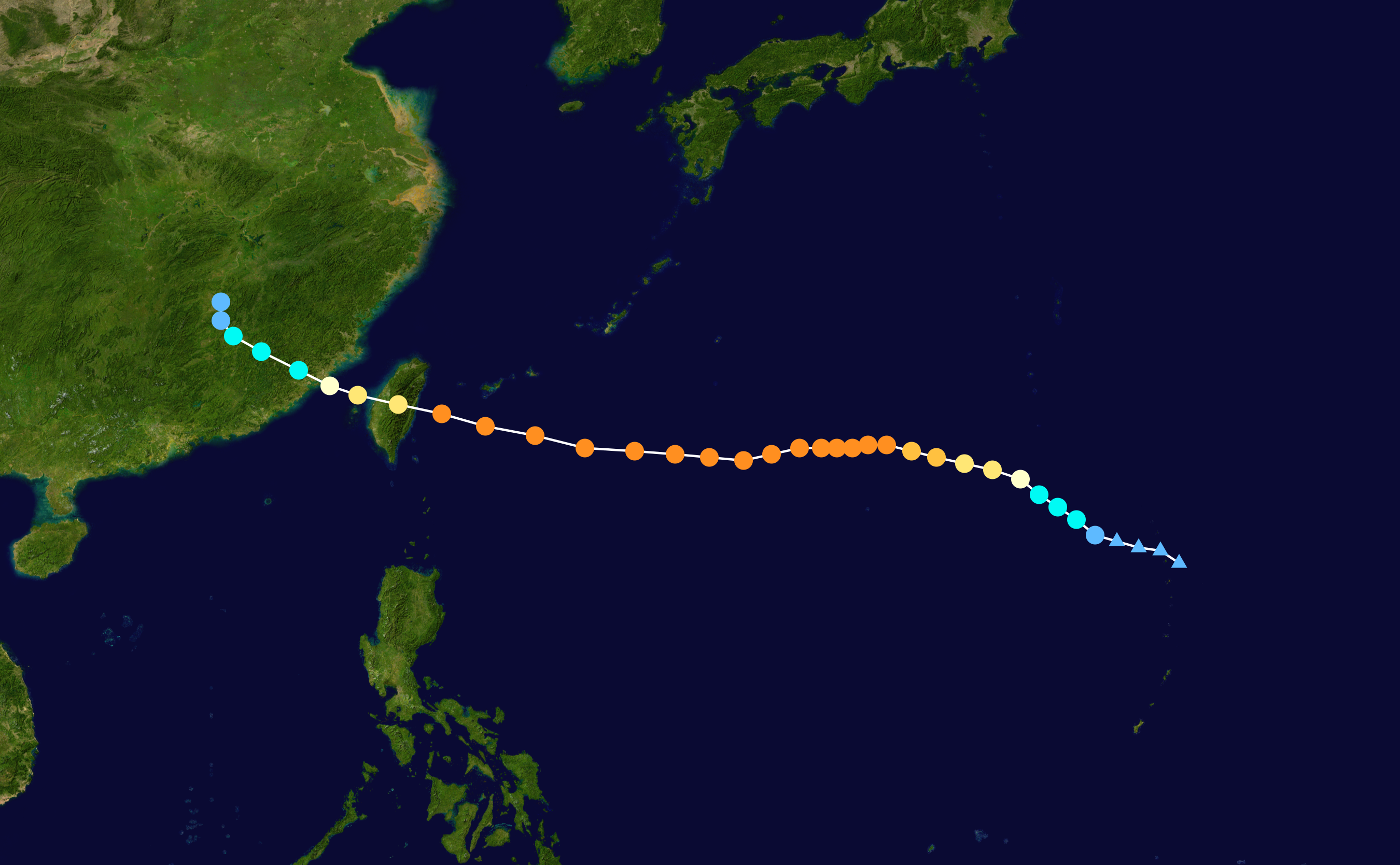
Map plotting the storm's track and intensity, according to the Saffir–Simpson scale Map key Saffir–Simpson scale Tropical depression (≤38 mph, ≤62 km/h) Tropical storm (39–73 mph, 63–118 km/h) Category 1 (74–95 mph, 119–153 km/h) Category 2 (96–110 mph, 154–177 km/h) Category 3 (111–129 mph, 178–208 km/h) Category 4 (130–156 mph, 209–251 km/h) Category 5 (≥157 mph, ≥252 km/h) Unknown Storm type Tropical cyclone Subtropical cyclone Extratropical cyclone, remnant low, tropical disturbance, or monsoon depression

On September 24, 2005, the Joint Typhoon Warning Center (JTWC) began monitoring a tropical disturbance north of the Mariana Islands. (Note: The Joint Typhoon Warning Center is a joint United States Navy – United States Air Force task force that issues tropical cyclone warnings for the western Pacific Ocean and other regions.) Convective banding features soon consolidated around a low-pressure area associated with the system, prompting the issuance of a Tropical Cyclone Formation Alert the following day. Later on September 25, the Japan Meteorological Agency (JMA) declared the system a tropical depression. (Note: The Japan Meteorological Agency is the official Regional Specialized Meteorological Center for the western Pacific Ocean.) Situated in a region characterized by low wind shear and favorable upper-level divergence, steady intensification ensued. Early on September 26, the JTWC also classified the system as a tropical depression, designating it as 19W. Hours later, both agencies assessed sustained winds to have reached 65 km/h (40 mph), indicating tropical storm intensity. As such, the JMA named the storm Longwang. (Note: The name Longwang (Mandarin: 龙王, [lʊŋ˧˥ wɑŋ˧˥]) was contributed by China and refers to the Dragon King, god of rain and storms in Mandarin.) Situated to the southwest of a ridge, the storm tracked slowly west-northwest, while strengthening at an increasing rate. A temporary turn northwest occurred on September 26 as Longwang approached a weakness in the ridge which had previously steered it west-northwestward. In the 24 hours following the storm's naming, Longwang quickly intensified into a typhoon. Once at typhoon status, the storm resumed a more westerly track as a second ridge extending from eastern Asia became the dominant steering factor.

On a westerly course toward Taiwan and eastern China, Longwang underwent a period of rapid intensification from September 27–28. At the end of this phase, the JMA assessed peak winds at 155 km/h (96 mph) while the JTWC rated it as a Category 4-equivalent typhoon on the Saffir–Simpson hurricane scale. On September 29, the Philippine Atmospheric, Geophysical and Astronomical Services Administration assigned the typhoon the local name Maring as it entered their area of responsibility. The following day, Longwang underwent a structural change, transitioning from asymmetrical banding to symmetrical, making it an annular tropical cyclone. During the transition, upper-level divergence and outflow significantly decreased, resulting in temporary weakening of the typhoon. Additionally, an increase in westerly wind shear caused the interior structure to become asymmetric, with a southwest to northeast tilt noted by dropsondes released by the Dropwinsonde Observations for Typhoon Surveillance project. Once the transition into an annular cyclone completed, Longwang re-intensified and attained its peak intensity on October 1 while situated 400 km (250 mi) south of Okinawa. The JMA assessed winds at 175 km/h (109 mph) along with a barometric pressure of 930 mbar (hPa; 27.46 inHg). The JTWC estimated Longwang to have been slightly stronger, with one-minute sustained winds of 230 km/h (140 mph). (Note: Operationally, the JTWC assessed Longwang to have been a super typhoon with maximum one-minute sustained winds of 240 km/h (150 mph); however, it was considered to have been slightly weaker in post-storm analysis.)

At the time of peak intensity, an unmanned weather reconnaissance vehicle, known as Aerosonde, was flown into the typhoon and recorded peak winds of 211 km/h (131 mph) at an altitude of 3 km (1.9 mi). As the storm approached Taiwan late on October 1, an eyewall replacement cycle began, with a large secondary eyewall forming around the inner one. At 1848 UTC, Doppler weather radar velocity estimates indicated winds of 240 km/h (150 mph) at an altitude of 3 km (1.9 mi). An interpolated surface pressure of 924.5 mbar (924.5 hPa; 27.30 inHg) was obtained based on the Aerosonde's data. After flying in the storm for ten hours, the unmanned vehicle encountered severe turbulence and crashed about 80 km (50 mi) east of Taitung City. Interaction with the mountainous terrain of Taiwan caused Longwang to weaken somewhat. The system ultimately made landfall near Hualien City at 0500 UTC on October 2. Just six hours after moving inland, Longwang emerged over the Taiwan Strait with its circulation mostly intact; however, weakening continued as it approached eastern China. Remaining over water for less than 12 hours, the typhoon made its second and ultimate landfall in Fujian Province around 1800 UTC on October 2 (0200 October 3 local time). The storm quickly degraded over the following day, with winds decreasing below gale-force within 12 hours. The former typhoon slowed and turned northward over western Fujian before dissipating late on October 3.

== Preparations ==
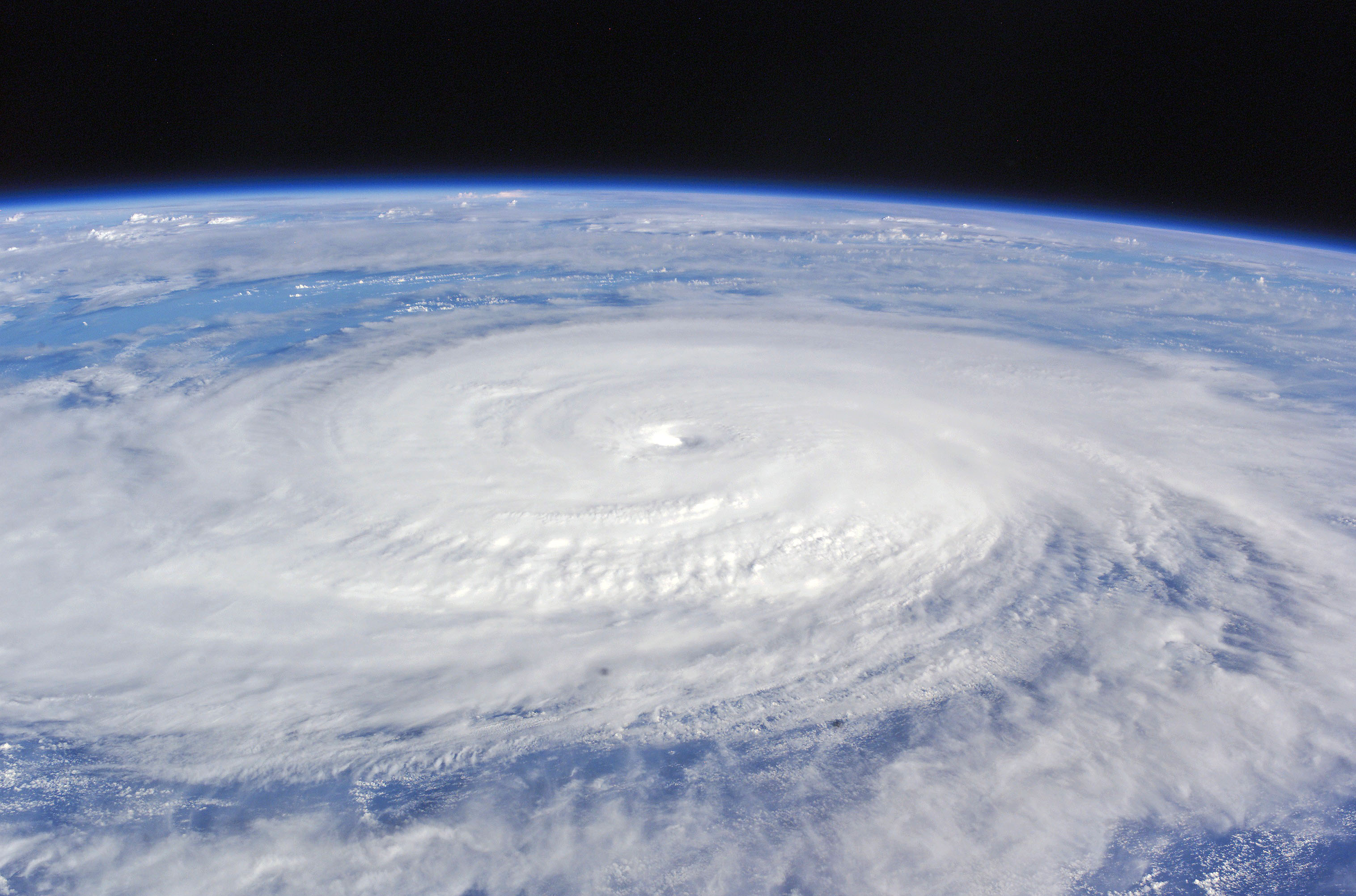
Typhoon Longwang seen from the International Space Station on September 27

The first indications of Longwang impacting Taiwan were on September 27, when the Central Weather Bureau (CWB) stated the storm was on a westerly course to the island. On September 30, the CWB issued a sea warning for areas surrounding Taiwan. Shortly after, the island's Central Emergency Operations Center was activated. Early on October 1, the whole of Taiwan was placed under a storm warning, prompting the Emergency Center to go to its maximum alert level. Daily meetings held by the Emergency Center provided officials with information on the storm and its expected impacts. Details from the meetings prompted the activation of all emergency operation centers in Taiwan. Nine counties were placed under debris flow advisories by the end of October 1.

On October 2, then-President Chen Shui-bian urged all residents to take serious precautions. 2,280 mountain climbers were advised to leave, the majority of whom complied. The Taiwan Railway Administration suspended operations on four rail lines. Rapid transit lines in Taipei maintained operations, though ran on slower schedules. For southern Taiwan, the main risk was fresh water flooding. Fifteen rivers were placed under high alert while 340 more were under moderate alert.

By the time Longwang made landfall, 37 shelters opened across the island, accommodating nearly 1,000 people. Additionally, 5,464 Chinese fishermen temporarily sheltered at Taiwanese ports. All airports were closed on October 2 and sea travel was suspended. With international airports shut down, President Chen, who was returning from a visit to the United Arab Emirates, was forced to land in Indonesia. The landing in Indonesia was seen as a political breakthrough for Taiwan as Indonesia does not recognize them as a separate nation from China.

By October 1, officials in mainland China issued warnings for Fujian Province and urged residents to evacuate. An estimated 537,000 people heeded these warnings in Fujian and a further 86,000 and 61,860 evacuated in Zhejiang and Guangdong provinces, respectively. The majority of evacuees were from the cities of Ningde, Fuzhou, Putian, Quanzhou, Xiamen, and Zhangzhou, with 376,000 evacuating from Xiamen alone. Along the coast, roughly 38,000 seagoing vessels returned to port. Thousands of officials in the province oversaw flood preparations. Public transportation across Fujian Province was temporarily suspended as well. The airport in Xiamen shut down late on October 2 as rain bands from the storm began impacting the area. Throughout Fujian, more than 120 flights were canceled.

== Impact ==
Impact by Region
Region	Fatalities	Injuries	Losses
China	147	>39	US$944.6 million
Japan	0	4	US$88,000
Philippines	0	0	None
Taiwan	3	73	>US$17.2 million
Totals	149	>116	~US$962.68 million

On October 1, Typhoon Longwang brushed the southern Ryukyu Islands of Japan. Wind gusts in excess of 120 km/h (75 mph) battered the islands of Ishigaki, Iriomote, and Yonaguni; a peak gust of 159 km/h (99 mph) was measured on Ishigaki. These winds caused travel disruptions, minor damage, and scattered power outages. Four people sustained minor injuries in Ishigaki City after being knocked down by the winds. Heavy rains accompanied the winds and accumulations peaked at 84 mm (3.3 in) in the Yaeyama District. Significant agricultural damage took place as well, with losses in the sector reaching ¥10 million (US$88,000). Farther south, the Batanes Islands of the Philippines experienced winds of 30 to 60 km/h (19 to 37 mph) in relation to the typhoon.

Due to the substantial loss of life and damage, the name Longwang was retired and replaced with Haikui (Chinese: 海葵) in 2006. The name was first used in the 2012 Pacific typhoon season.

=== Taiwan ===
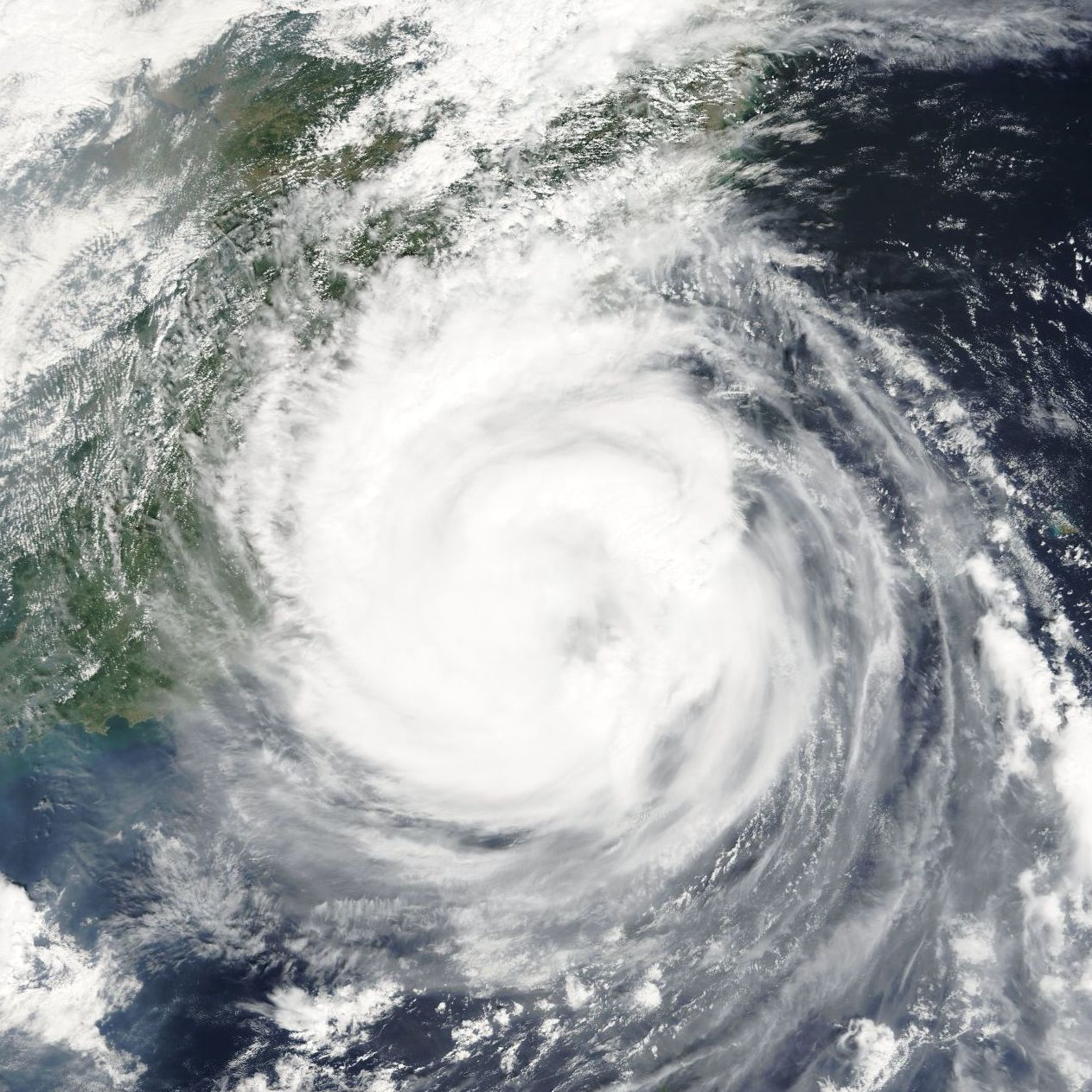
Typhoon Longwang over Taiwan on October 2

Striking Taiwan as a powerful storm early on October 2, Longwang brought destructive winds to many areas along the island's east coast. Hualien City experienced the brunt of the impact with sustained winds reaching 163 km/h (101 mph) and gusts up to 234 km/h (145 mph). These gusts were the highest ever recorded in the city, surpassing the previous record set during Typhoon Louise in 1959. On the west coast of Taiwan, gusts reached 153 km/h (95 mph) in Wugi. Torrential rains impacted many areas, with a peak 24 hour accumulations in Hualien County reaching 764.5 mm (30.10 in). A one-day total of 576 mm (22.7 in) was also measured in Yilan County.

At the storm's height, 749,621 households lost power while 24,817 lost telephone service. In Hualien County, a man was killed after being struck in the head by an iron bar that crashed into his home; 33 others were injured in the county. At least one home collapsed and six others were damaged in the county. High waves broke a 200 m (660 ft) stretch of a levee near ChiAnn, a coastal community in Hualien, and flooded nearby homes. Part of the entrance to the Hualien Martyrs Shrine collapsed amid strong winds. Billboards and trees fell across Hualien City, littering the streets with debris. Elsewhere on the island, 13 others sustained injuries and one person was reported missing. In Chiayi City, a bus and truck collided, injuring 16 and on Provincial Highway 16, 11 people were injured when their coach bus crashed into a telephone pole. It is unknown how much, if any, of a role the typhoon was in these accidents. In Kaohsiung, a concrete slab was torn off a building and wedged into a high rise apartment. One woman died after being swept away by flash flooding in the central town of Hoping. Within the Alishan National Scenic Area 106 landslides occurred, covering an area of 1.29 km^{2} (0.50 sq mi). Along the coast, a 7,000 ton cargo vessel broke loose from its mooring and drifted for 1 km (0.62 mi) before running aground and breaking apart.

Overall, 3 people died, and 73 more were injured across Taiwan. Infrastructural damage was less than feared with losses amounting to NT$70 million (US$2.2 million). Then-Premier Frank Hsieh stated that the relative lack of damage "was some good fortune in the midst of this misfortune." Substantial agricultural took place, with rice, bananas, Chufeng grapes, and leafy vegetables being the hardest hit. Losses in the sector exceeded NT$500 million (US$15 million). Though unrelated to the typhoon, a magnitude 5.4 earthquake struck Taiwan late on October 1, sending residents in Hualien panicking into streets despite the ongoing typhoon.

=== East China ===
Typhoon Longwang, weakened from its passage of Taiwan, struck mainland China late on October 2 as a low-end typhoon. Off the coast of Lianjiang County, gusts reached 164 km/h (102 mph) on Xiayu Island. Gusts onshore peaked at 137 km/h (85 mph) in Changle within Fuzhou City. Though the storm brought typhoon-force winds, they were mostly confined to coastal areas and its greatest impacts resulted from torrential rains. Much of Fuzhou City experienced over 200 mm (7.9 in) of rain, with a maxima of 332 mm (13.1 in) in Changle. Of that total, 316 mm (12.4 in) fell in a 12‑hour span. Furthermore, one hour accumulations peaked at 152 mm (6.0 in). These rains were described as a 1-in-100 year event. Zhejiang and Jiangxi Provinces also experienced heavy rains; 292 mm (11.5 in) fell in Taizhou, Zhejiang while 128 mm (5.0 in) was recorded in Nanfeng County, Jiangxi.

The greatest damage from Longwang took place in Fujian Province, especially within the city of Fuzhou where torrential rains overwhelmed the Jinan River and its tributaries. The ensuing flood inundated a 13.69 km^{2} (5.29 sq mi) of the city and resulted in 62 fatalities and left 24 people missing. Direct losses from the flood in Fuzhou alone reached 2.2 billion RMB (US$264 million). Some areas were submerged by flood waters 2 m (6.6 ft) deep and many landslides caused significant damage. A large auto plant owned by the Fujian Motor Industry Corporation, covering 83 hectares, was completely flooded. Many auto parts sustained heavy damage and losses at the plant reached 330 million RMB (US$39.9 million). In Minhou County, Fuzhou, a landslide destroyed a barracks of the Chinese paramilitary police where 142 officers were staying. Roughly 7,000 soldiers were deployed to the area for search and rescue. Ultimately, 47 people were rescued (39 of whom were hospitalized) and 85 bodies were recovered.

Striking during the week-long holiday following Chinese National Day, tourism suffered greatly in the region. Across China, 4.7 million people were directly affected by the typhoon, 4 million of whom were in Fujian Province. Preliminary assessments indicated that 9,400 homes were destroyed, leaving 129,400 people homeless. Fifty schools were damaged or destroyed as well. A total of 160,000 hectares (3.9 million acres) of farmland was damaged and 40,900 heads of livestock were lost. Collectively, 417 km (259 mi) of roadways washed away or sustained damage and 103 km (64 mi) of river embankments were lost. Total losses reached 7.81 billion RMB (US$944.6 million), nearly half of which took place in the industrial sector. Typhoon Longwang was the deadliest storm to strike China in 2005 with 147 lives lost.

Reconstruction and restoration within Fujian Province began shortly after the storm's passage. By October 6, power had been restored to most areas and roads were cleared. On November 13, five officers stationed at the barracks that was destroyed were punished as accountable for the deaths of the 85 cadets. Following an investigation by the Central Military Commission and State Council, all five were dismissed from their posts while Hou Yongjun, the director of the brigade, was to be prosecuted.

== See also ==
- Weather of 2005
- Tropical cyclones in 2005
- Timeline of the 2005 Pacific typhoon season
- Typhoon Herb (1996)
- Typhoon Sinlaku (2002)
- Typhoon Haitang (2005)
- Typhoon Dujuan (2015)
- Typhoon Megi (2016)
- Typhoon Haikui (2023) — a typhoon which made a similar track, whose name is coincidentally the replacement for Longwang and was also retired after the season
