= Typhoon Dujuan (2015) =

Pacific typhoon in 2015

Typhoon Dujuan (Jenny)
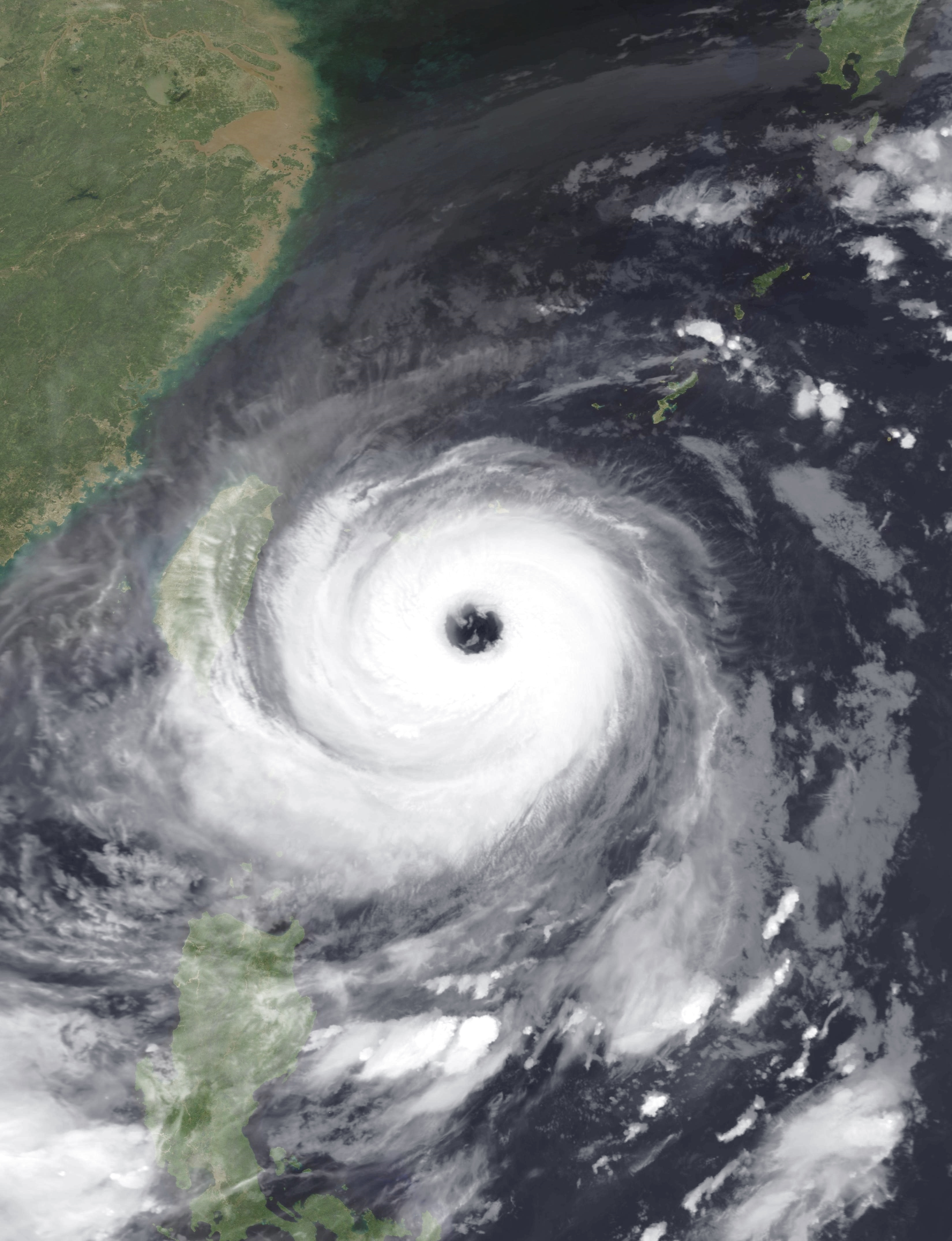
- Typhoon Dujuan at peak intensity while approaching Taiwan on September 27

Meteorological history
- Formed: September 20, 2015
- Dissipated: September 30, 2015

Violent typhoon
- 10-minute sustained (JMA)
- Highest winds: 205 km/h (125 mph)
- Lowest pressure: 925 hPa (mbar); 27.32 inHg

Category 4-equivalent super typhoon
- 1-minute sustained (SSHWS/JTWC)
- Highest winds: 240 km/h (150 mph)
- Lowest pressure: 926 hPa (mbar); 27.34 inHg

Overall effects
- Fatalities: 3 confirmed
- Damage: $406 million
- Areas affected: Ryukyu Islands, Taiwan, East China
- IBTrACS
- Part of the 2015 Pacific typhoon season

Typhoon Dujuan, known in the Philippines as Super Typhoon Jenny, was the second most intense tropical cyclone of the Northwest Pacific Ocean in 2015 in terms of ten-minute maximum sustained winds, tied with Noul. The twenty-first named storm and the thirteenth typhoon of the 2015 Pacific typhoon season, Dujuan brought extremely powerful winds throughout the Yaeyama Islands and Taiwan in late-September, causing 3 deaths in Taiwan. The typhoon also caused over ¥2.5 billion (US$392.9 million) damage in East China.

Dujuan originated as a monsoon depression, developing into a tropical storm on September 22. After slowly consolidating under an improving environment, the system intensified into a typhoon on September 25, and it started to present a large eye two days later. Dujuan reached its peak intensity on September 27 and made landfall over Taiwan on the next day. Interaction with the mountainous terrain of Taiwan significantly weakened the typhoon. Dujuan then made its second landfall over Fujian on September 29.

== Meteorological history ==
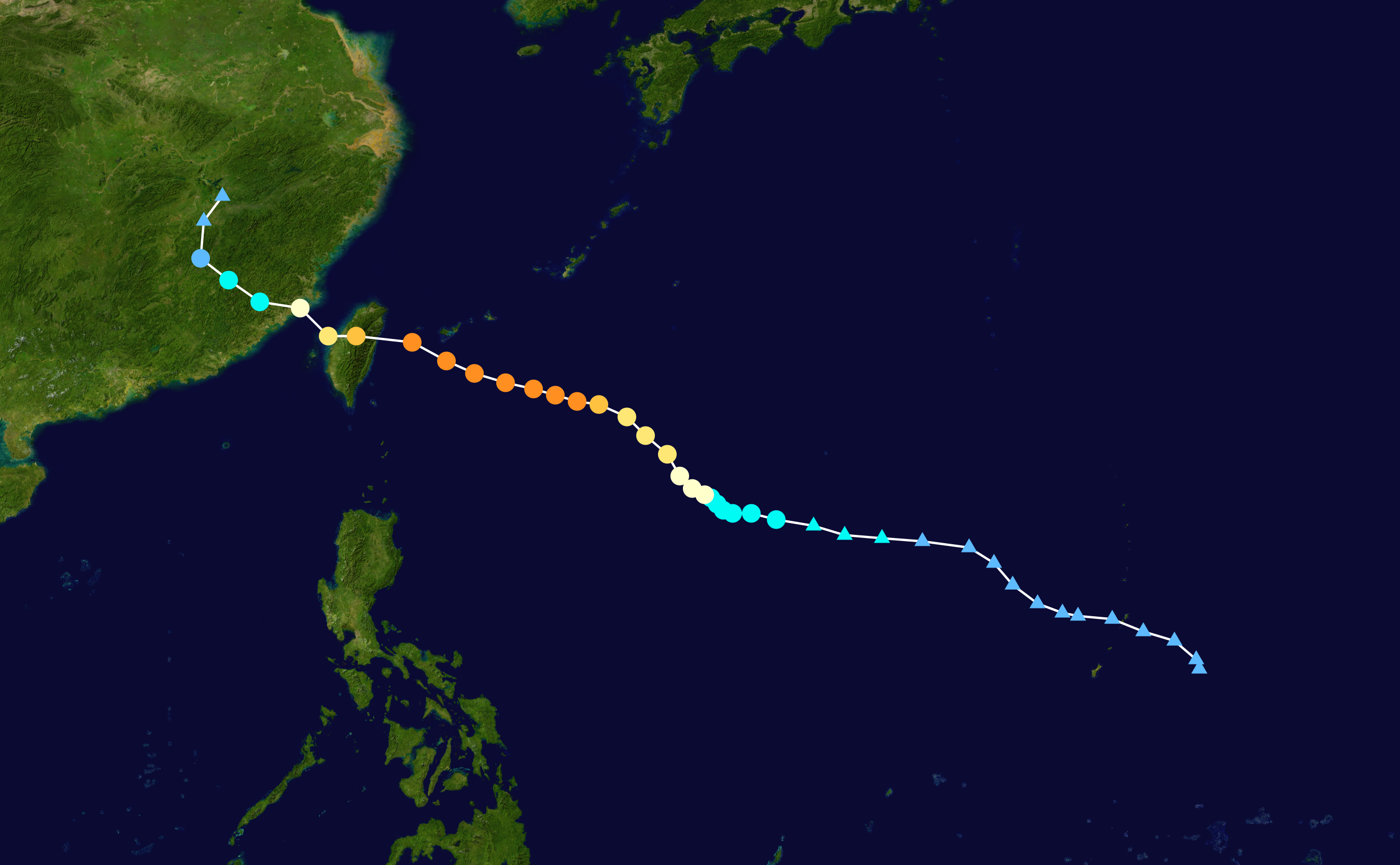
Map plotting the storm's track and intensity, according to the Saffir–Simpson scale Map key Saffir–Simpson scale Tropical depression (≤38 mph, ≤62 km/h) Tropical storm (39–73 mph, 63–118 km/h) Category 1 (74–95 mph, 119–153 km/h) Category 2 (96–110 mph, 154–177 km/h) Category 3 (111–129 mph, 178–208 km/h) Category 4 (130–156 mph, 209–251 km/h) Category 5 (≥157 mph, ≥252 km/h) Unknown Storm type Tropical cyclone Subtropical cyclone Extratropical cyclone, remnant low, tropical disturbance, or monsoon depression

The origin of Typhoon Dujuan can be traced back to a tropical disturbance that formed over the Maloelap Atoll late on September 14. Convection remained very fragmented until September 20, when the Japan Meteorological Agency (JMA) upgraded the low-pressure area to a tropical depression east-northeast of Guam early on that day. Moreover, the Joint Typhoon Warning Center (JTWC) started to issue a Tropical Cyclone Formation Alert at the same time and indicated a monsoon depression, although the low-level circulation center (LLCC) was exposed and located east of the deep convective banding. In the afternoon on September 21, the JMA began to issue tropical cyclone warnings to the system, shortly before the JTWC also upgraded it to a tropical depression and designated it as 21W, based on the convective structure and a RapidSCAT image. On September 22, although the structure remained asymmetric with a fully exposed LLCC under easterly moderate vertical wind shear, the system still intensified into a tropical storm late on the same day and received the name Dujuan from the JMA. (Note: The name Dujuan (Mandarin: 杜鹃, [tu˥˩ t͡ɕyɛn˥]) was contributed by China and means azalea in Mandarin.)

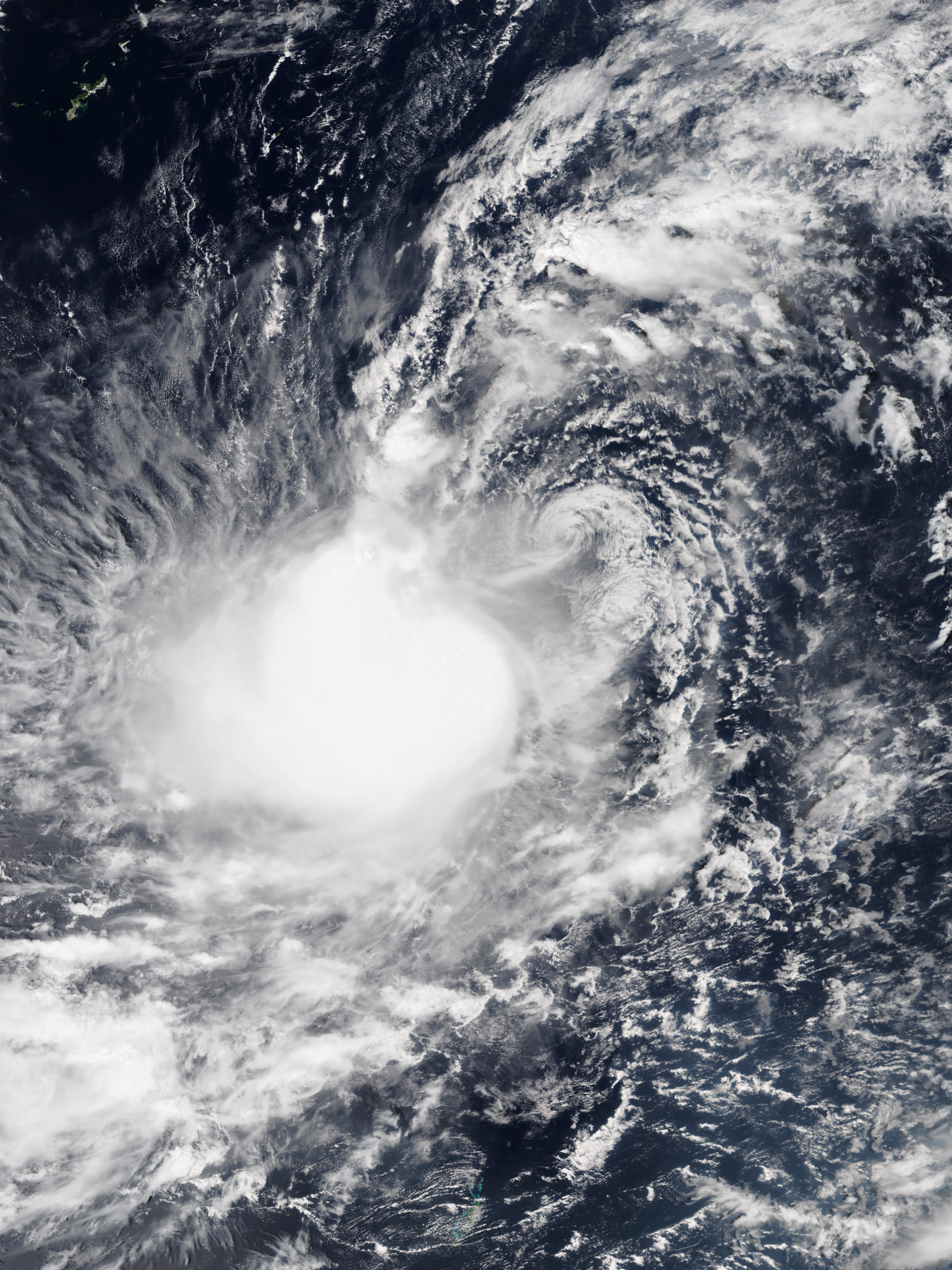
Tropical Storm Dujuan with a fully exposed LLCC on September 23

Many meteorological agencies initially forecasted a recurving track south of Japan to Dujuan, but those agencies changed it to a west-northwest track pointing to Taiwan after 24 hours. Dujuan developed smaller vortices rotating around a larger circulation centroid with deep convection along the western periphery on September 23; however, right after the storm entered the Philippine Area of Responsibility and was named Jenny by PAGASA, there was only one partially exposed LLCC within the consolidating structure in the afternoon, leading more model guidances to show a stairstep track vice a recurve scenario. When moving and organizing slowly on September 24, Dujuan was upgraded to a severe tropical storm early on that day, with an apparent eye revealed by a microwave imagery. Based on a ragged eye under decreasing vertical wind shear, both of the JTWC and then the JMA upgraded Dujuan to a typhoon early on September 25, as the system started to track northwestward along the southwestern periphery of a deep-layered subtropical ridge.

Good divergent outflow as well as low vertical wind shear allowed Dujuan to intensify stably on September 26, yet dry air and subsidence were impacting the system at the same time, causing the western eyewall to break down. Due to decreasing dry air, Dujuan improved its overall structure significantly late on the same day when starting to track west-northwestward. Due to sea surface temperatures of 29 °C and improved radial outflow enhanced by a microscale anticyclone aloft, the JTWC indicated that the typhoon with an enlarged 80 km (50 mi) eye embedded in the highly deep and symmetric core had one-minute maximum sustained winds at 230 km/h (140 mph) early on September 27, equivalent to Category 4 of the Saffir–Simpson hurricane wind scale. This was increased to 240 km/h (150 mph) in post-season reanalysis, making Dujuan a super typhoon. Right after record-breaking winds were observed in Yonaguni of Okinawa, Japan around 16:00 JST (07:00 UTC) on September 28, the JMA raised Dujuan's estimated intensity of ten-minute maximum sustained winds to 205 km/h (127 mph) immediately, although the deep convective banding had begun to loosen with unraveling along the western side.

Soon, the eye shrunk quickly and became cloud-filled when the eyewall was interacting with the terrain of Taiwan, indicating a weakening trend from both the JMA and the JTWC. The Central Weather Bureau (CWB) announced that Typhoon Dujuan had made landfall over Nan'ao, Yilan at 17:40 TST (09:40 UTC); at around 01:00 TST on September 29 (17:00 UTC on September 28), Dujuan emerged into the Taiwan Strait from Fangyuan, Changhua. Severely eroded by the Central Mountain Range and the Xueshan Range in Taiwan, the system rapidly weakened and was downgraded to a severe tropical storm by the JMA at 00:00 UTC on September 29. Dujuan made its second landfall over Xiuyu District, Putian of Fujian, China at around 08:50 CST (00:50 UTC) on September 29, shortly before the JTWC issued the final warning. The JMA downgraded the system to a tropical storm at 06:00 UTC and then a tropical depression at noon. One day later, the system was absorbed into a stationary front which later became a powerful extratropical cyclone.

== Impact and records ==
=== Japan ===
Maximum wind speed in Yonaguni on September 28, 2015

Typhoon Dujuan brought extremely powerful sustained winds and gusts in the Yaeyama Islands on September 28. The Yonaguni weather station observed a maximum gust of 81.1 m/s (292 km/h) and maximum 10-minute sustained winds at 54.6 m/s (197 km/h), surpassing all previous records on the island; based on the observations in Yonaguni, Dujuan caused the fourth strongest gust and the seventh strongest sustained winds in the history of Japan, and that gust was also the strongest in Japan since September 1966. The typhoon also broke the record of maximum sustained winds near the Yonaguni Airport (Tokorono), which observed 42.6 m/s (153 km/h). Overall, five weather stations throughout the Yaeyama Islands observed hurricane-force sustained winds from Dujuan.

Agricultural damage throughout Okinawa Prefecture is estimated at ¥180.1 million (US$1.5 million), including ¥127.58 million (US$1.06 million) in Yaeyama Islands. 322 houses in Yonaguni were damaged, and 10 of them were completely destroyed by the typhoon. Roofs of many schools and gymnasium halls were blown away on the island, and products such as sugar canes were severely damaged. All cargo ships and ferries to Yonaguni were suspended during Dujuan, including a large cargo which carries everyday goods from main islands of Okinawa. A power outage also affected about 400 houses in Yonaguni.

=== Taiwan ===
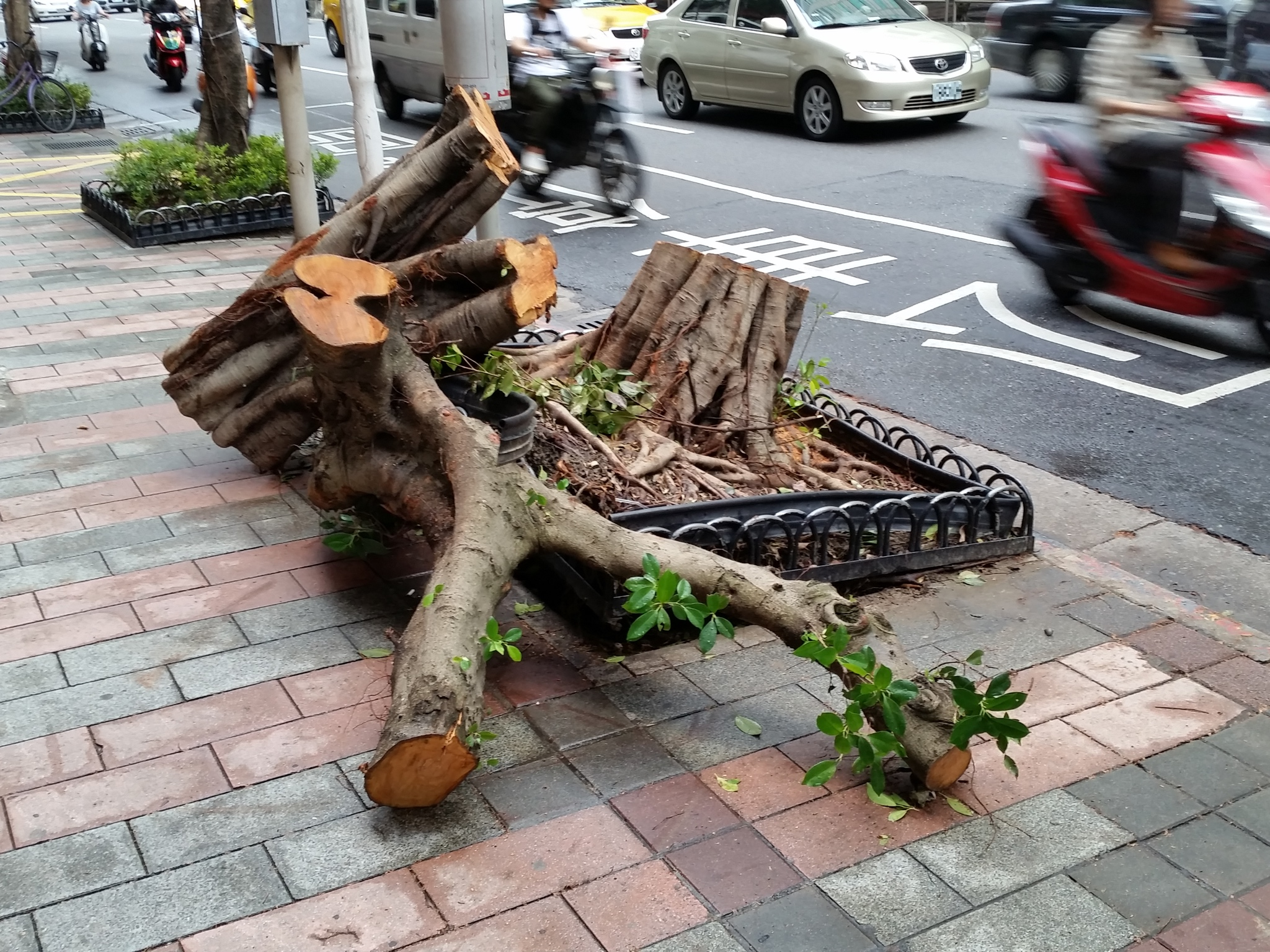
A cut-off tree in Taipei, originally tilted by Typhoon Dujuan

Typhoon Dujuan caused three deaths and 376 injuries in Taiwan. A female driver went into a skid and crashed in Nangang District, Taipei. She died later after being sent to a hospital. In Tucheng District, New Taipei, an elderly man died after being knocked down by strong winds. A group of people tried to fix a fallen fence at a construction site in Beitun District, Taichung; however, when a man was standing on a corrugated sheet, strong winds rolled them up. The man died due to a three-meter fall. Over 2.25 million houses throughout Taiwan suffered from power outage, and over 180 thousand houses in Taipei and New Taipei faced water outage.

Preliminary losses to agriculture are estimated at NT$217.01 million (US$6.59 million), and Yunlin County suffered the biggest losses, estimated at NT$82.89 million (US$2.49 million), accounting for 38 percent of the country's total losses. Losses in the category of crops were estimated at NT$201.45 million (US$6.05 million), with 8,018 hectares affected. Heavy rainfall on September 28 and 29 led to serious rockslides at a section of the Alishan Forest Railway which was destroyed by Typhoon Morakot and reconstructed recently, ruining plans by the Taiwan Railways Administration to reopen the full length of the railway on December 25.

Bon Jovi's only two concerts at the Taipei World Trade Center Nangang Exhibition Hall on September 28 and 29 were canceled due to Typhoon Dujuan, as the Taipei City government announced school and office closures for the two days. During the first landfall, the weather station in Su'ao, Yilan observed the maximum gust at 68.4 m/s (246 km/h) and maximum sustained winds at 40.4 m/s (145 km/h), and that gust became the second strongest of the station in history.

=== Elsewhere ===
Across East China, nearly 1.7 million people were affected by the typhoon. The most severe damage took place in Fujian Province where 400 homes collapsed, 31,000 hectares (77,000 acres) of farmland were flooded, and total economic losses reached ¥2.4 billion (US$377.5 million). Total economic damage in East China were at ¥2.536 billion (US$398.5 million). The remnants of Dujuan, which were moving from Japan to Sakhalin, later merged with a "deep rain cyclone" just south of Sakhalin, becoming a hurricane-force extratropical low on October 1. This low uprooted over 600 trees and torn off the roof of a residential building in Korsakov. Due to this cyclone, 16 people were hospitalized and 1 person died. Cape Crillon received gusts of 140 mph (63 m/s) while Yuzhno-Sakhalinsk received gusts of 35 m/s (78 mph). Elsewhere, downpours flooded the village of Novoselskoye, causing 30 people to be evacuated.

== See also ==
- Weather of 2015
- Tropical cyclones in 2015
- Typhoon Aere (2004)
- Typhoon Longwang (2005)
- Typhoon Soudelor (2015)
- Typhoon Nepartak (2016)
- Typhoon Megi (2016)
- Typhoon Gaemi (2024)
