= List of rivers of Central America and the Caribbean =

This is a list of rivers of Central America and the Caribbean by country.

== Central American rivers by country ==
=== El Salvador ===
- Lempa River

=== Guatemala ===
- Motagua River
- Usumacinta River

=== Honduras ===
- Patuca River
- Ulua River
- Chamelecón River
- Aguán River
- Humuya River
- Choluteca River
- Leán River
- Coco River
- Blanco River
- Lempa River
- Motagua River

=== Nicaragua ===
- Coco River
- Escondido River
- Grande de Matagalpa River
- San Juan River

=== Panama ===
- Tuira River
  - Chucunaque River
- Chagres River
- Chepo River
- La Villa River
- Chiriquí Viejo River

== Caribbean rivers by country ==
The Dutch Caribbean (including Aruba) and all other unlisted territories have only streams or creeks due to their small island size. The Bahamas only has one river, the Goose River, in Central Andros and many creeks.
