= List of rivers of Honduras =

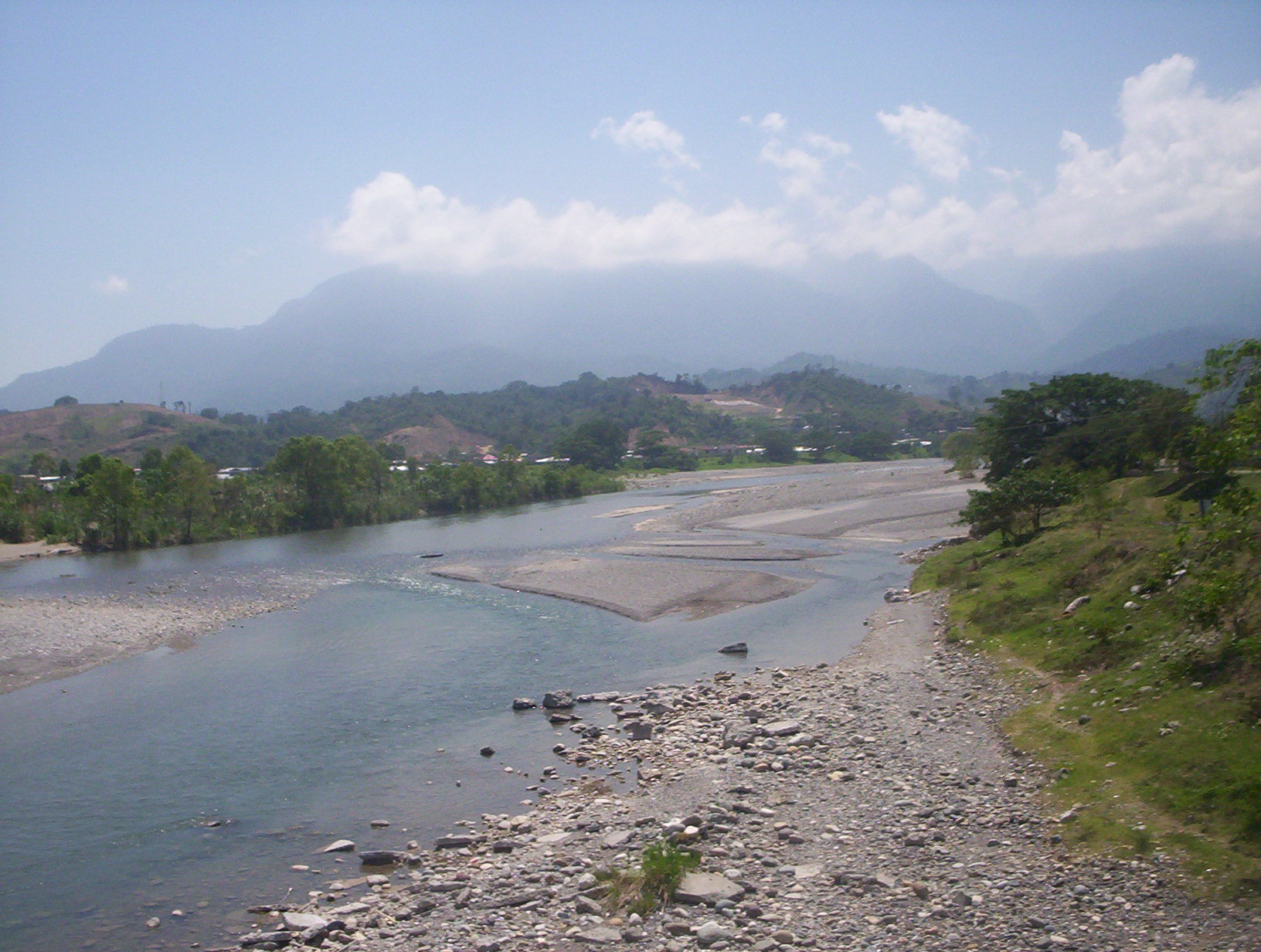
The Río Cangrejal in La Ceiba

Among the most important rivers in Honduras is the Ulúa, which flows 400 kilometres (250 mi) through the economically important Valle de Sula. Numerous other rivers drain the interior highlands and empty north into the Caribbean Sea. The Pacific Ocean coast also receives other important rivers, such as the Choluteca River, which flows through the capital, Tegucigalpa, where it wreaked havoc during the 1998 Hurricane Mitch. La Quebradona is a river located in La Ruidosa, Copán. La Comisión Permanente de Contingencias is the body which gives out alerts when rivers are in danger of overflowing.

This list is arranged by drainage basin, from east to west, with respective tributaries indented under each larger stream's name.

== Caribbean Sea ==
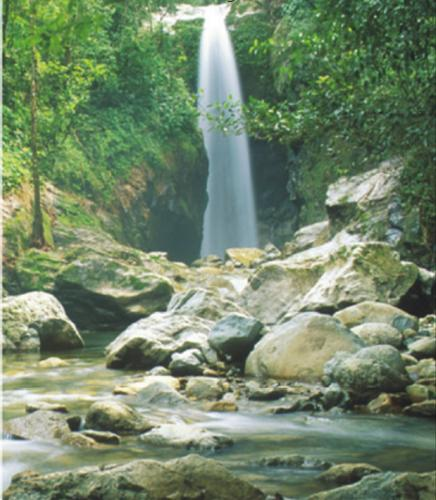
Aguán River

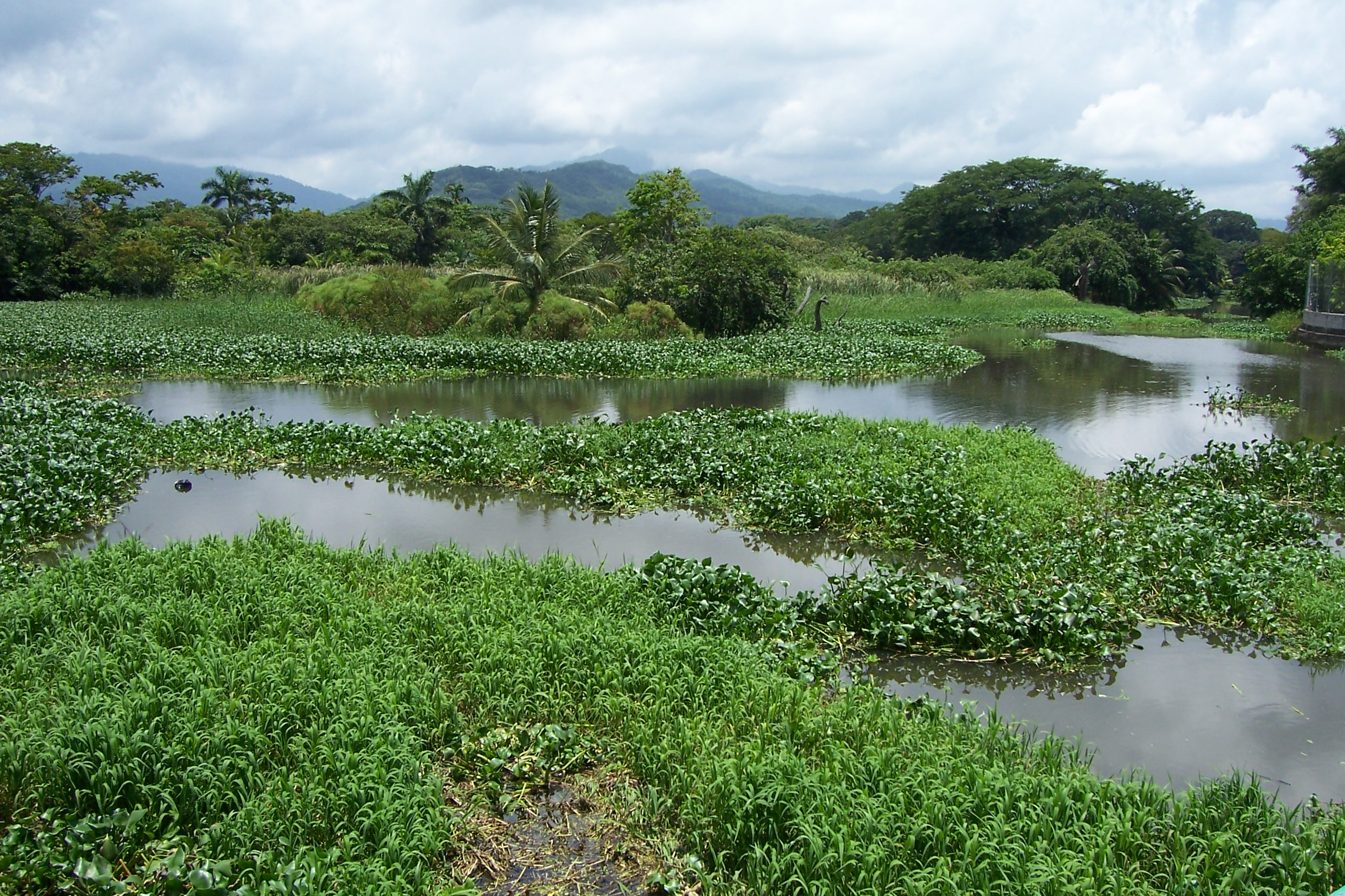
Tela River

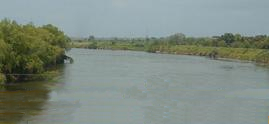
Ulúa River

- Coco River (Segovia River) borders Nicaragua.
- Cruta River
- Nakunta River
- Malombo River is a minor river in Omoa.
- Mocorón River
- Warunta River
- Patuca River is the largest in Honduras and the second largest in Central America.
  - Wampú River
  - Guayambre River
  - Guayape River
    - Tinto River
    - Talgua River
    - Telica River
    - Jalan River
- Sigre River
- Plátano River
- Río Sico Tinto Negro (Tinto River)
  - Sico River
  - Paulaya River
- Aguán River
  - Yaguala River (Mangulile River)
- Papaloteca River
- Cangrejal River
- Danto River
- Cuero River
- Leán River
- Tela River
- Ulúa River is the most important river economically.
  - Humuya River
    - Sulaco River
  - Blanco River
  - Otoro River (Río Grande de Otoro)
    - Río Gualcarque
  - Jicatuyo River
    - Higuito River
- Chamelecón River
- Motagua River
  - Cuyamel River

=== Pacific Ocean ===
- Choluteca River
- Goascorán River forms the El Salvador - Honduras border.
- Guarajambala River
- Lempa River
- Mocal River
- Nacaome River
  - Petacon River
  - Azacualpa River
  - De la Sonta River
- Negro River
- Sumpul River
- Torola River

== See also ==
- List of rivers of the Americas by coastline
