= Tropical Storm Gamma (2005) =

Atlantic tropical storm in 2005

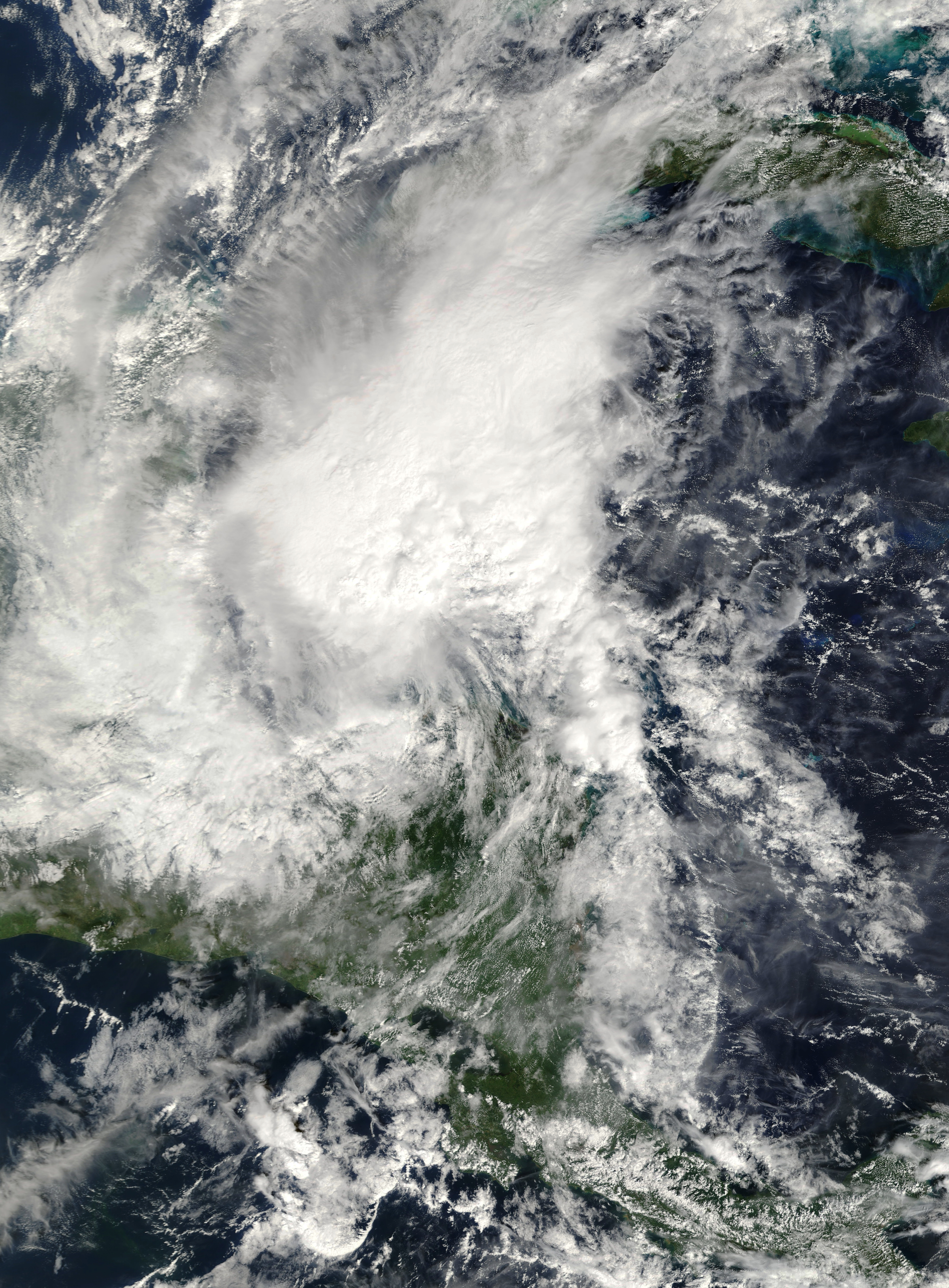
- Gamma at peak intensity near Honduras on November 19

Meteorological history
- Formed: November 14, 2005
- Dissipated: November 22, 2005

Tropical storm
- 1-minute sustained (SSHWS/NWS)
- Highest winds: 50 mph (85 km/h)
- Lowest pressure: 1002 mbar (hPa); 29.59 inHg

Overall effects
- Fatalities: 39 total
- Damage: $18 million (2005 USD)
- Areas affected: Lesser Antilles, Honduras, Belize
- IBTrACS
- Part of the 2005 Atlantic hurricane season

Tropical Storm Gamma caused severe flooding in Honduras in November 2005. The twenty-fifth namable storm of the season, Gamma first developed as a tropical depression on November 14 just west of the Windward Islands from a tropical wave that left the west coast of Africa on November 3. Although tropical storm-force winds did not impact the islands, the storm brought damagingly heavy rainfall to Trinidad and to St. Vincent and the Grenadines, causing two deaths on Bequia due to a mudslide. The depression intensified into a tropical storm on November 15 over the Caribbean Sea while moving away from the Windward Islands. However, unfavorable wind shear weakened the storm to a tropical depression later that day and caused it to degenerate into a tropical wave on November 16 about halfway between Colombia and Jamaica.

Continuing westward across the Caribbean, the remnants of Gamma interacted with a low-pressure area on November 18. This likely aided the system into re-developing into Tropical Storm Gamma along the north coast of Honduras that day. The cyclone strengthened and peaked with winds of 50 mph (85 km/h). Despite predictions of the storm striking Cuba and potentially Florida, Gamma instead drifted over the Gulf of Honduras and weakened due to wind shear, degenerating into a remnant low on November 21 which struck Honduras before dissipating the next day. Intense flooding and landslides occurred in Honduras, especially along the north coast. The storm destroyed about 2,000 homes and displaced thousands of people, including approximately 50,000 people who became isolated after dozens of bridges were swept away. Banana crops alone suffered $13–18 million in damage, while 34 fatalities occurred in the country. Three others died in Belize after a plane crash, blamed on severe weather from the outer rainbands of Gamma.

== Meteorological history ==
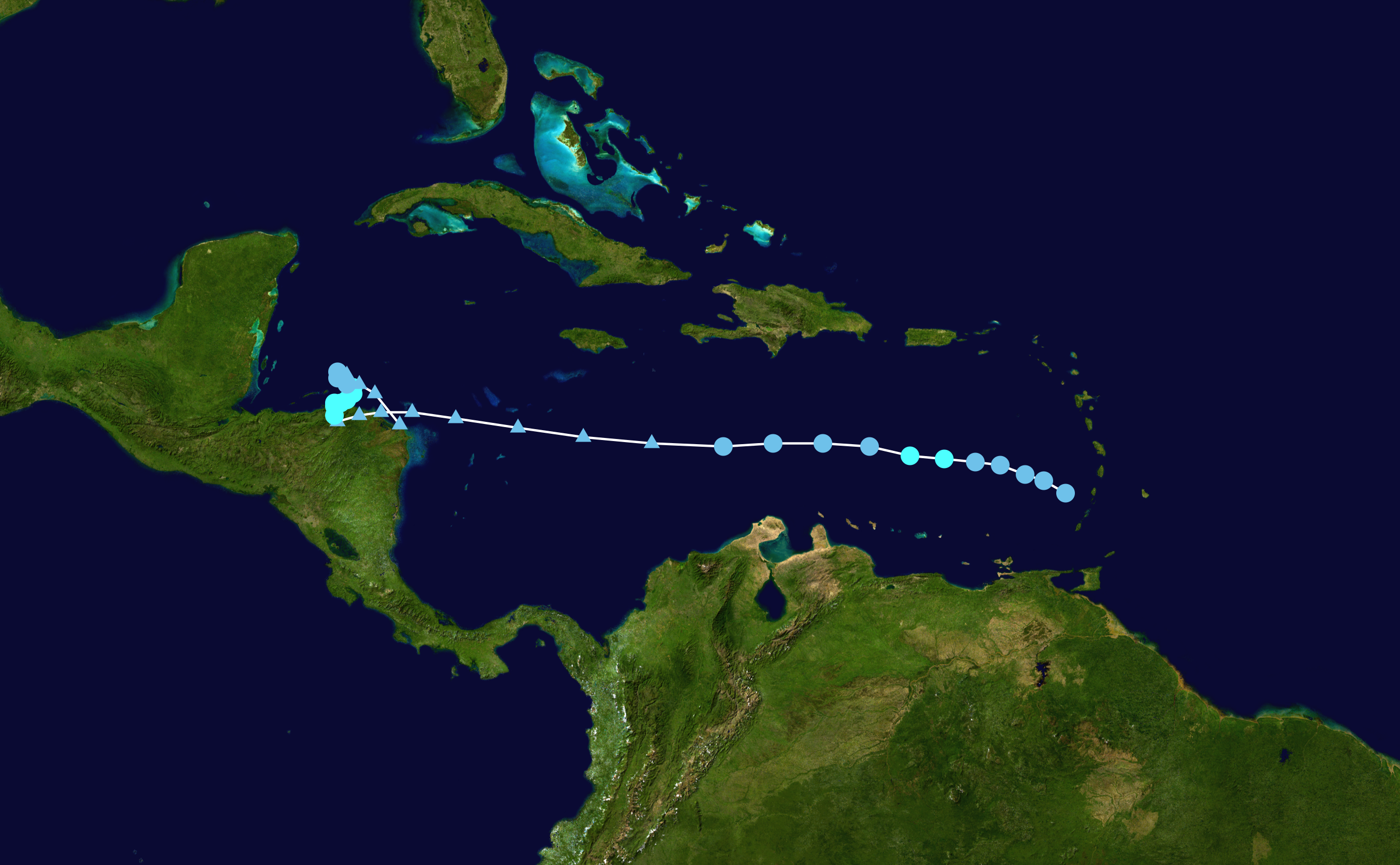
Map plotting the storm's track and intensity, according to the Saffir–Simpson scale Map key Saffir–Simpson scale Tropical depression (≤38 mph, ≤62 km/h) Tropical storm (39–73 mph, 63–118 km/h) Category 1 (74–95 mph, 119–153 km/h) Category 2 (96–110 mph, 154–177 km/h) Category 3 (111–129 mph, 178–208 km/h) Category 4 (130–156 mph, 209–251 km/h) Category 5 (≥157 mph, ≥252 km/h) Unknown Storm type Tropical cyclone Subtropical cyclone Extratropical cyclone, remnant low, tropical disturbance, or monsoon depression

Tropical Storm Gamma originated out of a tropical wave that moved off the western coast of Africa on November 3. For a late-season tropical wave, the system maintained an unusually high amount of convection as it trekked across the Atlantic Ocean. The National Hurricane Center (NHC) began to actively track the wave on November 13, when it was located about 100 mi (160 km) off the coast of Barbados. That day, a low-pressure area formed along the axis of the wave, with moderate easterly wind shear initially keeping convection displaced well to the east. However, wind shear soon abated, making conditions conducive for tropical development. Early on November 14, radar imagery from Martinique indicated that rainbands formed near and just east of the low-level circulation. Consequently, Tropical Depression Twenty-Seven developed at 00:00 UTC over the far eastern Caribbean Sea about 55 mi (90 km) west of Saint Vincent.

An upper-level trough near the Greater Antilles continued to provide westerly shear that briefly stalled further development, but the system's strong convection persisted. A break in the shear on November 15 enabled the storm to briefly strengthen. Post-season analysis by the NHC showed the system reached tropical storm status during this period and should have been christened Gamma, as ships well to the northwest reported near-tropical storm-force winds and Dvorak satellite intensity estimates reached T2.5, suggesting sustained winds of 40 mph (65 km/h). But as this was not seen at the time, the storm remained classified Tropical Depression Twenty-Seven. A deep-layered subtropical high pressure ridge over the southwestern Atlantic Ocean and Gulf of Mexico propelled the system westward across the Caribbean at more than 25 mph (40 km/h) and the storm's upper circulation was entirely separated from its deep convection and low level circulatory center. The NHC, believing that the system was dissipating, announced that it was issuing its last advisory on November 16. Around 18:00 UTC, the tropical cyclone degenerated into a tropical wave about halfway between Colombia and Jamaica.

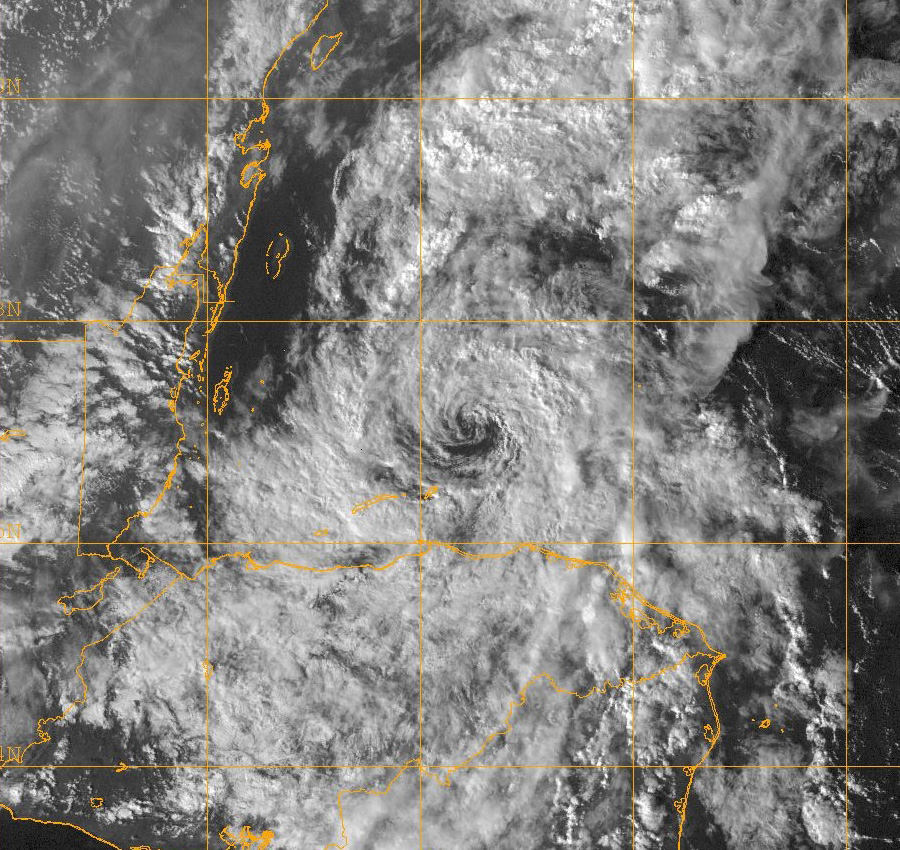
Tropical Depression Gamma just north of Bay Islands, Honduras on November 20, with a circulation largely devoid of deep convection

The deep-layered subtropical high pressure ridge initially caused the remnants of the tropical cyclone to continue generally westward at 23–25 mph (37–40 km/h), until the system slowed down while approaching Honduras on November 17. A low-pressure area, which had formed over Panama in early November and had produced rainfall in the region, merged into the waning remnants of Tropical Depression Twenty-Seven near Honduras on November 18. Although the NHC described the interaction of these two systems as complex, the low likely aided the remnants of Gamma in redeveloping into a tropical storm around 18:00 UTC on November 18 along the north coast of Honduras about 15 mi (25 km) southwest of Limón, Honduras. The redeveloped system was slow to strengthen, owing to the presence of high wind shear. It reached peak winds of 50 mph (80 km/h) before the shear exposed the center and weakening began. The NHC initially predicted that Gamma would move northward towards western Cuba and South Florida in response to an expected weakening of the high pressure area to Gamma's north, with the trajectory potentially enabling intensification to hurricane intensity. However, the high pressure region persisted and kept Gamma within the high wind shear environment over the northwestern Caribbean Sea. Despite flares of convection, Gamma weakened into a tropical depression on November 20 and further into a remnant low early on November 21. The low quickly dissipated on November 22 near the Honduran-Nicaraguan border.

== Preparations ==
On November 18, the government of Honduras issued tropical storm warnings for the Bay Islands, Belize issued a tropical storm warning for its entire coast, and Mexico issued a tropical storm watch for the eastern Yucatán Peninsula from the Belize border to Punta Allen. Before dawn the next day, as Gamma drew closer, Mexico modified the watch to a warning for its coast from the Belize border to Punta Gruesa, and expanded the tropical storm watch from Punta Gruesa to Tulum. That afternoon the storm moved away from Belize the southernmost portion of the tropical storm warning was lifted, followed in totality a few hours later. That night, Mexico also lifted its watching and warnings. It was not until the following day, November 20, that the warnings were lifted from the Bay Islands of Honduras.

Because the storm regenerated shortly before it was predicted to make landfall, few advanced preparations for the storm were taken in Honduras. However, constant rainfall for well over a day as Gamma wandered offshore caused floods that forced over 30,000 people to abandon their homes for state-run shelters.

== Impact and aftermath ==
Country	Deaths
Belize	3
Honduras	34
St. Vincent	2
Total	39

Two people were killed by a mudslide in St. Vincent and the Grenadines on the island of Bequia as Gamma's precursor, Tropical Depression Twenty-Seven, brought heavy rains. Overflowing rivers destroyed seven homes and make several roads impassable. The island's airport was temporarily closed when the tropical depression flooded the terminal and left debris on the runway. Heavy rains caused flooding and landslides, which washed away two bridges on the island of Trinidad, outside Port-of-Spain. Flooding led to the water rescue of 100 people around Vega-de-Oropouche and 10 people in Carapo. Gamma also brought heavy rainfall to the ABC islands as a tropical wave in the central Caribbean on November 17.

Gamma's effects impacted some 90,000 people in Honduras. Although tropical storm-force winds did not impact mainland Honduras, an unofficial report of 4.44 inches (113 mm) of rain was reported on Roatan Island, and more than 30 inches (760 mm) of rain fell along the northern coast between November 16 and 19 before Gamma even reached the country. The Tropical Rainfall Measuring Mission (TRMM) estimated that as much as 9.8 in (250 mm) fell over the northwestern Mosquitia. The rainfall triggered flooding and landslides in the northern departments of Gracias a Dios, Colón, Atlántida, Cortés, Yoro, Santa Bárbara, and the Bay Islands which killed 34 people and left 13 missing. These areas had already been affected by Hurricane Wilma and Hurricane Beta about a month earlier. The combined rainfall total from Wilma, Beta, and Gamma amounted to about a quarter of the region's annual rainfall. Flooding extended inland to Chiquerito along the Sico River. Heavy rains in the upstream watersheds of the Paulaya and Sico rivers caused widespread inundation across downstream communities. The floodwaters eventually breached narrow barrier islands along the Honduran coast, forming channels in three locations. The largest of these channels occurred in Batalla and spanned 1,150 ft (350 m) across and 23 ft (7 m) deep; the channel persisted until April 2006. The flooding in central Batalla destroyed 34 buildings and damaged a hundred other homes, leading to two fatalities. Dozens of bridges were washed away cutting off more than 50,000 people and 2,000 homes were destroyed. 5,200 acres (21 km^{2}) of banana crop was destroyed, totaling $13–18 million (2005 USD) in damage.

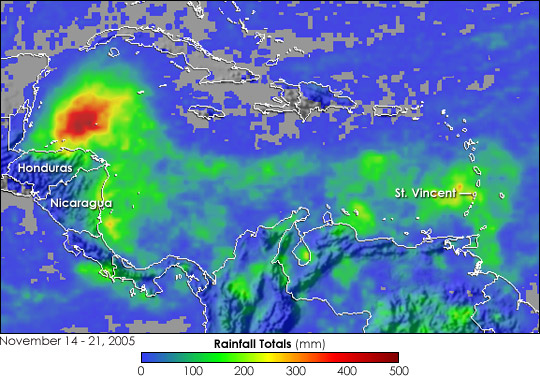
Rainfall totals produced by Gamma as estimated by the Tropical Rainfall Measuring Mission

In Belize, Gamma contributed to the crash of a Britten-Norman BN-2 Islander, operating for the Blancaneaux Lodge. All three people aboard were killed after it flew into a wooded hillside in reduced visibility caused by Gamma's outer bands. Five fishermen from Sarteneja were lost at sea during the storm when a large wave capsized their boat.

The only country suffering lasting impacts from the storm was Honduras. After the storm turned out to sea and Gamma's rains desisted, Honduran helicopters began rescuing those stranded by flood waters. The United Nations' World Food Programme spent $460,000 (2005 USD) airlifting 645 tonnes of food, enough for 195,000 five-person families, to northern Honduras. The Red Cross also provided food aid, hygiene kits, blankets and other humanitarian aid to families that had sustained damage to their property or were displaced into shelters. Both of these organizations already had active distribution networks in the country as they were responding to hurricanes Stan, Wilma, and Beta, all of which caused fatalities in Honduras that year.

The government of Andalucía, in Spain, donated 40 million lempiras to aid in disaster efforts, and the United States employed helicopters from a nearby military base to assist Honduran ones in the distribution of food aid. Relative to the hurricanes of previous weeks, the humanitarian needs following Gamma were minimal, and were simply blended into the ongoing efforts.

== Naming and records ==
When Tropical Depression Twenty-seven unexpectedly developed into a tropical storm, it marked the first time that the third letter of the Greek alphabet was used as the name of an Atlantic storm. The next one to be so named was Hurricane Gamma in 2020. Gamma's record-setting formation date as the season's 25th tropical or subtropical storm would stand until 2020, when broken by Hurricane Delta, which formed on October 5.

== See also ==
- Tropical cyclones in 2005
- Timeline of the 2005 Atlantic hurricane season
- October 2008 Central America floods – caused by a series of low-pressure areas including Tropical Depression Sixteen
