= Herlyn Espinal =

Honduran journalist and television reporter (1982–2014)

- Born: 14 September 1982; Santa Rita, Yoro, Honduras
- Died: 20 July 2014 (aged 31)
- Occupation: Journalist

Herlyn Iván Espinal Martínez (14 September 1982 – 20 July 2014) was a Honduran journalist and television reporter who worked as chief correspondent in San Pedro Sula, the second largest city in Honduras, for Televicentro's daily newscast Hoy Mismo.

Espinal was abducted in the vicinity of Santa Rita, in the department of Yoro, early on the morning of 20 July 2014. He was found dead, a victim of multiple gunshot wounds, in a nearby location on the morning of 21 July. He was the forty-third journalist killed in Honduras since 2013.

== Early life and education ==
Espinal was born and raised in the Santa Rita district of Yoro. In a 2009 interview he said that from an early age he had aspirations of becoming a journalist. In his youth, Espinal was active in the La Fragua theater company in El Progreso, Yoro.

== Career ==
His first job as a journalist was with a local television channel in Agua Blanca Sur, Yoro, as a reporter and a presenter. He did both his own field work and presented it later on camera. He told an interviewer that journalists should always be "objective, impartial, and honest", and that journalists who take bribes will ultimately be exposed, adding, "Truth is mighty and will prevail".

He also worked as a correspondent for Radio Progreso. Both the La Frague theater company and Radio Progreso were founded by the Jesuit order in El Progreso, Yoro.

As chief correspondent for Hoy Mismo, which aired in San Pedro Sula, Cortés, Honduras's second largest city, he coordinated all news reports from northern Honduras.

On multiple occasions he ran as a Liberal Party candidate for city council, and at the time of his death was planning to run yet again. He said in 2009 that his "greatest personal ambition" was to pursue investigative journalism and to become mayor of Santa Rita and create new work opportunities for the town. The two people he admired most, he stated, were his grandmother, "a worthy example of perseverance and triumph", and his mother.

At the time of his murder, he was living in an apartment in San Pedro Sula.

== Murder ==
Espinal was found dead on 21 July 2014. He was 31 at the time of his murder. In the aftermath of his murder, contradictory information circulated regarding the last hours of his life and the circumstances of his death. Some sources claimed he was shot two times, others that he had been shot up to five times. One report of his death stated that the city in which he worked, San Pedro Sula, is "considered the most violent city in the most violent country on the planet".

Espinal's mother stated that he had been at her home in Santa Rita watching television around 9 p.m. on July 19 when an unidentified man phoned and arranged a meeting, which Espinal agree to. Later that evening, according to multiple accounts, Espinal met with friends at a restaurant in Santa Rita, and also left with friends very early on the morning of July 20, 2014. He reportedly arrived back at his mother's home around 3 a.m., parked his car in front of the house, and then voluntarily entered a white panel truck in which three other persons were seated.

Some sources added further details, some of which appeared to conflict with others for timeline reasons. It was stated, for example, that Espinal, after leaving Las Tejas at around 2 a.m., had soon after joined up with friends with whom he proceeded to socialize at various other places in Santa Rita. Another detail that was mentioned in some reports but not others had Espinal arriving that same night at the Paradise Motel shortly after 3:00 a.m. and leaving it shortly before 4:00 a.m. At least one source stated that he had entered the Paradise Motel with "a man of fair complexion, height about 1.93 metres (6 ft 4 in) tall and burly", and had left the motel with that man, Espinal being at that point "semi-naked".

Also at around 4 a.m., a source reported Espinal heading alone toward a bridge in Santa Rita, looking "distressed". At the same hour, residents of the neighbourhood of Echeverry were said to have "heard several explosions" near another bridge in Llano Campo in Santa Cruz de Yojoa. In addition, a guard interviewed by police reported that he had heard blasts of gunfire around 4:00 am.

Authorities stated that Espinal had been murdered at 4:05 a.m. According to one source, his family was informed of his disappearance several hours later that morning and reported him missing soon after, with some reports placing this action shortly after noon that day.

=== Discovery ===
Espinal's body was reportedly discovered along a road between the towns of El Olivar and La Danta in an area called El Batey, in the department of Yoro. He was allegedly found face down and shirtless, his body already partially decomposed and his face disfigured by gunfire. Several reports variously described his body as having been found in a vacant lot, in bushes in a pasture, and in a ditch. One report indicated that according to forensics reports, he had been shot five times, sustaining wounds to his arm, torso, neck, and a fatal shot to the back of the head, and had been killed about 24 hours before his body was found, which was inconsistent with known facts. His body was reportedly identified at the scene by his stepfather, José Santos Ramírez, and another relative, José Jiménez.

On the same day that Espinal's body was found, a pool of blood and shell casings were purportedly found on a bridge over the Humuya River on the road between Santa Rita and La Barca.

=== Reactions ===
In a piece published on July 26, a local commentator (Harold Obed Salinas) summarized the multiple inconsistencies among the various accounts of Espinal's last hours and murder. The commentator further maintained that the investigation of Espinal's death was marred by corruption and incompetence, and accused the prosecution, which had claimed the case was solved, of being determined to convict innocent persons and protect the real murderers. In addition, the commentator opined that it was highly suspicious, given the confusion surrounding the basic facts of the case, and given the long investigations that had followed similar murders in Honduras, for authorities to claim that they had solved the crime within five days of its commission.

Two major Honduran civil-society groups, La Asociación para una Ciudadanía Participativa (ACI PARTICIPA) and El Centro de Prevención, Tratamiento y Rehabilitación de Victimas de la Tortura y sus Familiares (CPTRT), expressed deep concern over the disappearance and murder of Espinal. Juan Mairena, head of the Honduran journalists' association, called his murder "a heavy blow for journalism".

After the Honduran Minister of Security, Arturo Corrales, suggested that the killing may have been a crime of passion or the result of an inheritance dispute, rather than an act of retribution motivated by his work as a reporter, PEN, the international organization for writers, expressed concern that investigators had ruled out Espinal's activity as a journalist as a possible motive within 24 hours of his body being found.

== Investigation and arrests ==
Just as there were inconsistencies in reports of Espinal's last hours and death, there were also apparent inconsistencies in reports about the subsequent investigation and arrests. On 23 July, Rigoberto Zambrano, who was purportedly in possession of the T-shirt Espinal had worn on the night of his disappearance and the gun used to shoot him, was taken into custody. Zambrano professed his innocence. It was reported that by 25 July, as a result of raids in Santa Rita, a total of four people had been arrested in connection with the murder. Corrales asserted that three people had been involved in the crime, and that the individual who had actually committed the murder was now outside the country. In mid-August Corrales said, "We know who did it, the reasons, and there is plenty of evidence".

José Rafael Bueso Oseguera, alias Lito Lito Kasasa, who was said to be the last known person to be with Espinal, was arrested on 29 August, and reports stated that he was the second person to be arrested in connection with the murder. Like Zambrano, Bueso declared his innocence, although he admitted that on the night of Espinal's disappearance he, Bueso, had also been at Las Tejas, where both he and Espinal had attended a party. It was reported that Bueso, after his arrest, had spoken with police for six hours and that he maintained that authorities had singled him out only because he owned a white vehicle similar to the one that Espinal had last been seen entering.

Authorities stated with "great fanfare" on 29 August that Bueso was "instrumental" in the case, but the next day they released him, citing lack of evidence of his involvement. On 31 August, the public prosecutor claimed that Bueso had never been detained, but had simply been interviewed as a witness because he was one of the last people to see Espinal alive.

A local commentator (Harold Obed Salinas), who criticized authorities on 31 August for their supposed sloppiness in the matter of Bueso, also charged them with failing to follow up leads properly and refusing to make information about the investigation publicly available. This same commentator also made sweeping accusations of official corruption and incompetence in the handling of the case, and noted that suspicion had now fallen upon a person named Juan Carlos Acosta Manzanares, although a similarity in names and appearance had caused someone named Juan Carlos Acostas Meléndez to be dragged into the case.

On 1 September, Espinal's mother issued a statement urging authorities to solve the crime. Hugo Maldonado, vice president of the Comité de Derechos Humanos (Codeh), said that it was lamentable that there was so much impunity in Honduras and that authorities might not want to make public the name of Espinal's real assassin.

A September 22 report indicated that Espinal's family had issued another such statement, calling directly on the president of Honduras for action in solving Espinal's murder and bringing his killers to justice. It was noted that as of September 22, one individual had been detained in connection with the murder, but that person was not considered a perpetrator, and that there was also an arrest order out for another person in connection with the murder.

In mid-September 2014, Hector Hernandez, coordinator of forensic medicine in San Pedro Sula, who had already been subjected to a 15-day suspension, was removed from his position because he had made public statements about the murder of Espinal. He had said that Espinal had died of multiple gunshot wounds, even though evidence had not yet been collected at the scene. While Hernandez would continue to operate as a forensic doctor on call, he would no longer be coordinator of the city morgue.
