= El Progreso =

- Municipality
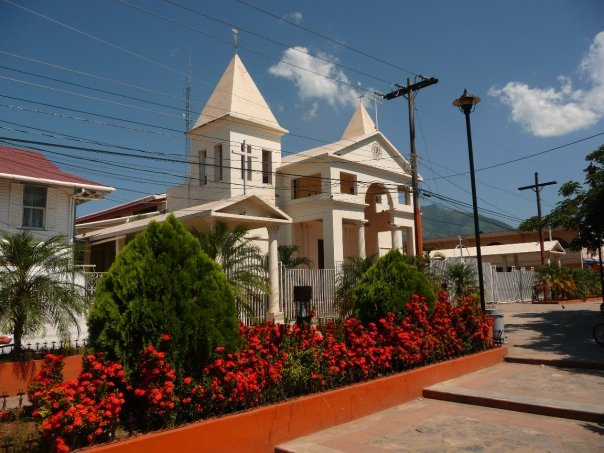
- Photo of Cathedral at the Central Park

- Flag Coat of arms
- Motto: 'The Pearl of Ulua'
- Location in Honduras
- Coordinates: 15°24′N 87°48′W
- Country: Honduras
- Department: Yoro
- Founded: 1892

Government
  - Alcalde (Mayor): Alexánder López (PL)

Area
  - Municipality: 534 km^{2} (206 sq mi)

Population (2023 projection)
  - Municipality: 204,420
  - Density: 383/km^{2} (991/sq mi)
  - Urban: 150,476
- Time zone: UTC-6 (Central America)
- Climate: Am

El Progreso (Spanish pronunciation: [el pɾoˈɣɾeso]) is a city, with a population of 120,600 (2023 calculation), and a municipality located in the Honduran department of Yoro.

Ramón Villeda Morales International Airport of San Pedro Sula is located west of the city. To the east of the city is the mountain range of Mico Quemado (Burned Monkey).

El Progreso is located at a crossroads. Due to its strategic location, many travellers or tourists pass through El Progreso in one way or another. Many travellers going to San Pedro Sula, Tela, La Ceiba, La Lima, and Tegucigalpa make a connection here or use it as a rest area.

The territorial extension of the municipality is 534 square kilometres (206 sq mi). Of this territory, 40.5 square kilometres (15.6 sq mi) is defined as urban and 493.5 square kilometres (190.5 sq mi) as rural. The municipality is also divided into three geographic zones that comprise more than 100 barrios, which are home to more than 90,000 people. The climate of the city is humid.

== Demographics ==
At the time of the 2013 Honduras census, San Francisco del Valle municipality had a population of 202,980 (2025). Of these, 81.07% were Mestizo, 16.12% White, 1.53% Indigenous (1.04% Chʼortiʼ, 0.28% Lenca), 1.04% Black or Afro-Honduran and 0.24% others.

== Economy ==
Due to its fertile lands, El Progreso is a city of agricultural tradition. The areas surrounding the city include various plantations producing products such as palm oil, bananas, and vegetables. Besides agriculture, the inhabitants of El Progreso also devote themselves to cattle ranching and to the production and trade of textiles.

Given El Progreso's location as a crossroads several fast food franchises have been established in the city to satisfy the demands of travellers. The Copprome Orphanage is based in this city.

Additionally, a new, modern mall from the Honduran "Plaza" chain of shopping centres has been constructed on the outskirts of the city. The mall, named Megaplaza, officially opened in the winter of 2007, and features a large food court with a vast array of Honduran and American fast food companies, several cell phone stores, an arcade, and department stores including Carrion, the largest in Central America. Megaplaza is also home to a new stadium seating-style cinema screening films from the US and Latin America.

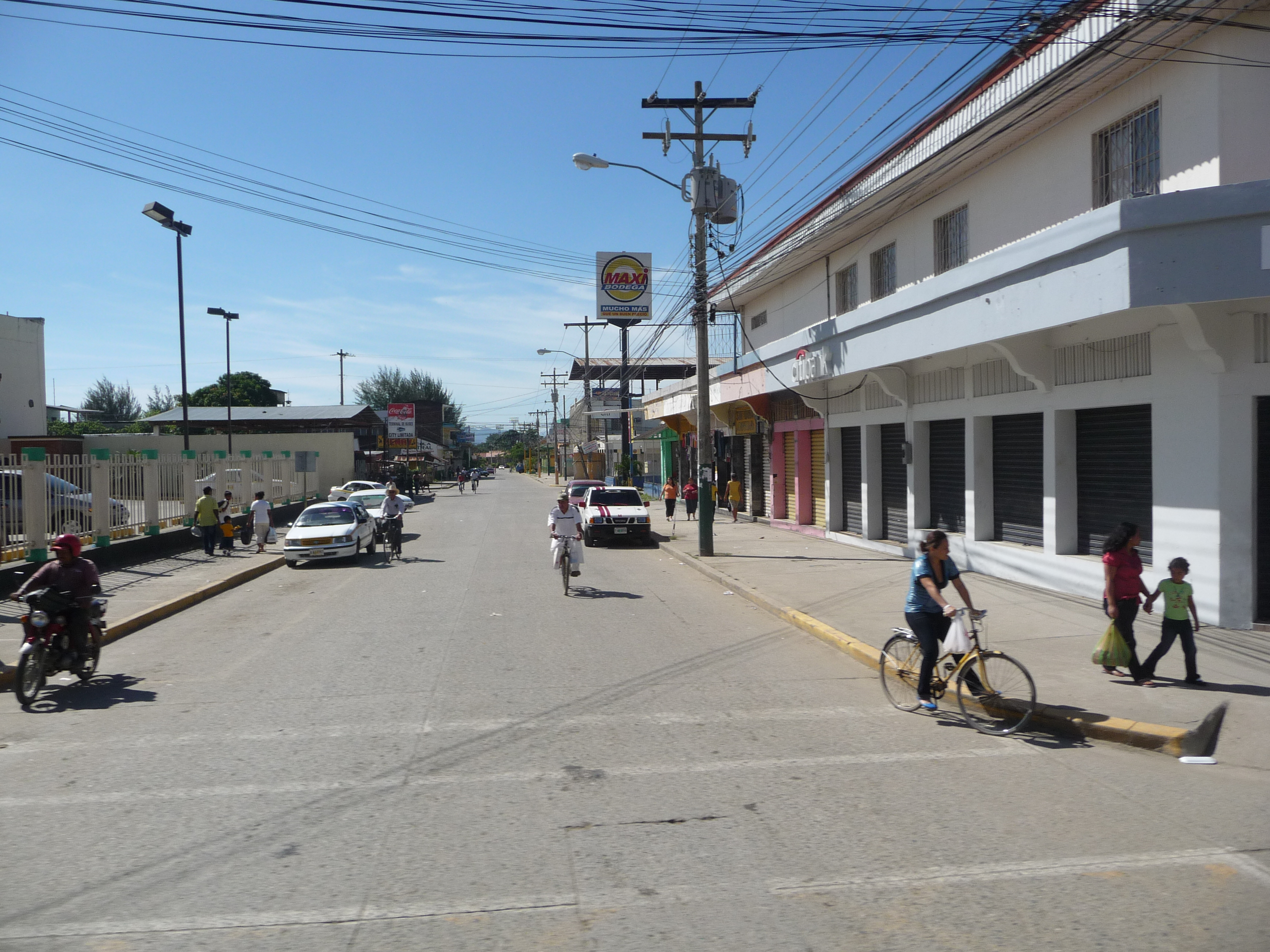
A typical streetview in El Progreso's downtown

== Geography ==
=== Mico Quemado ===
The mountain chain of Mico Quemado is one of the main attractions of the city. It is located to the east of el Progreso, facing the great Valley of Sula (Valle de Sula).

More than 280 square kilometres (110 sq mi) of this mountain chain are protected by the Honduran Central Government. This is due to its ecological wealth, which is inhabited by a great quantity of plants and exotic animals. The area is also important for the inhabitants of the city because it is the source for the city's water system.

El Progreso is sometimes called "the bicycle City" because many of their people use the bicycle as a faster and more economical mode of transportation. This is perhaps a reflection on the relative poverty among the working class, as many of the city streets remain unpaved, and economic development has remained uneven.

=== Ulúa River ===
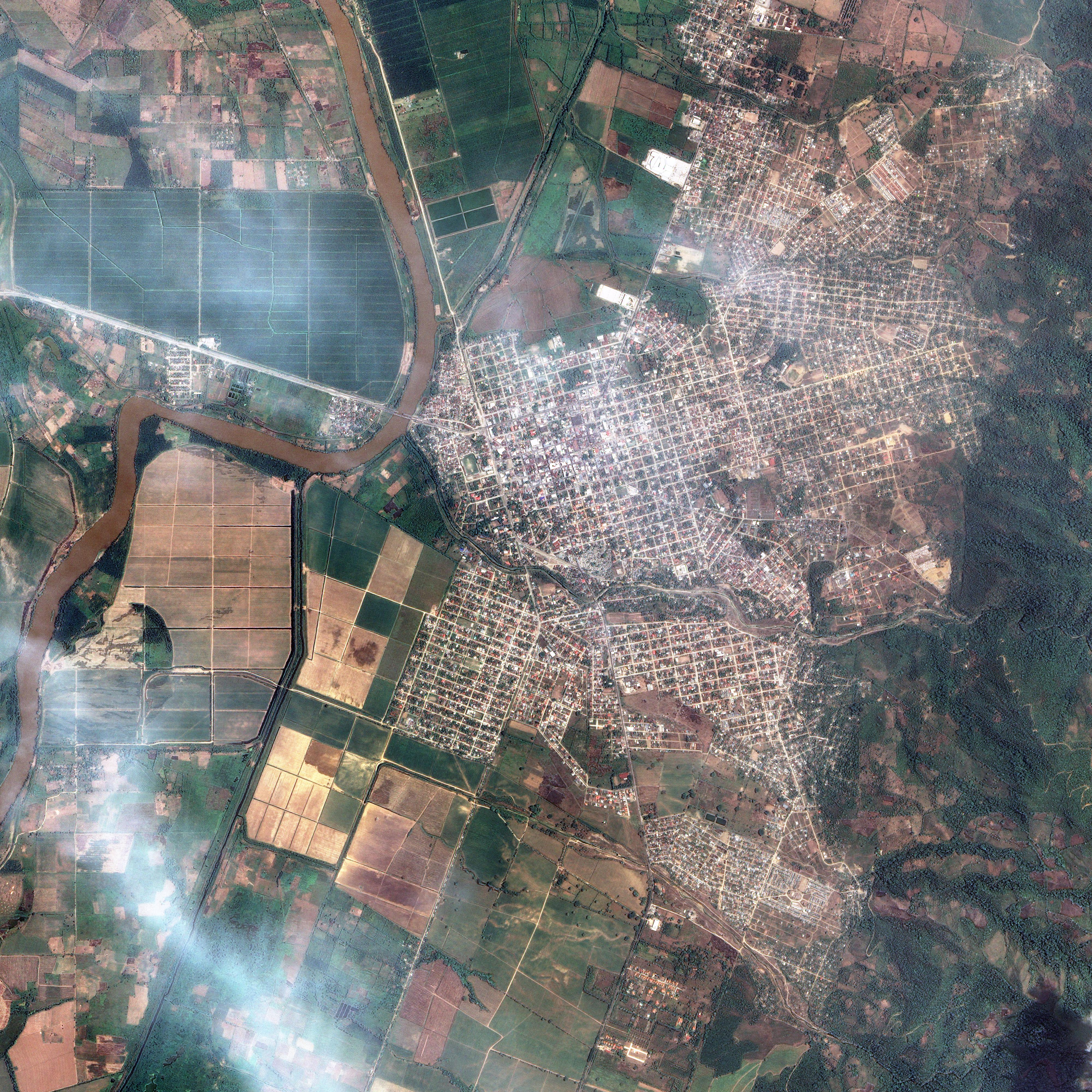
Ulua River winds through El Progreso

The Ulúa River is one of the biggest and most important rivers of Honduras. This river has its birth in the department of Intibucá under the name of Rio Grande de Otoro.

The river runs through the departments of Santa Bárbara, Cortés, Yoro and Atlántida. It is fed by Higuito River, Mejocote River, Jicatuyo River, Pelo River, Comayagua River and Sulaco River.

The total length of Ulua River is 400 kilometres (250 mi). Due to its strong current, the Ulúa River is also a dangerous river. During cyclones or torrential rains it has a tendency to grow excessively, therefore causing damages to the cities where it runs. Hurricane Mitch crept ashore on 29 October 1998 and lingered until 3 November, leaving as much as 3 feet of rain in its wake as it lingered and meandered northward. This resulted in epic flooding and total devastation of the Ulúa basin. Recovery is still incomplete after a decade later.
