= Tinto River (Guayape) =

Location
- Country: Honduras

The Tinto River is a river in Honduras. It is a tributary of the Guayape River.

== Etymology ==
The Tinto was also called the Cuyamel, as of 1850.

== See also ==
- List of rivers of Honduras
