= Otoro =

Otoro may refer to:

- Otoro River, Honduras
- Otoro Nuba people
  - Otoro language
- Ōtoro, a very fatty type of Toro (sushi)
