= Caratasca Lagoon =

Large lagoon in Honduras

Coordinates: 15°23′0″N 83°51′0″W

The Caratasca Lagoon (Spanish: Laguna de Caratasca) is a large lagoon in the department of Gracias a Dios in northeastern Honduras. Puerto Lempira, the capital of the department, lies on its shores.

The lagoon covers 1,110 km^{2} (430 sq mi) and extends approximately 25 miles inland from the Caribbean Sea, and is fed by rivers including the Mocorón, Warunta, and Nakunta. The largest island in the lagoon is Tansin. Its western shore is protected as part of a biological reserve.

The Caratasca Lagoon was the site of the landfall of Hurricane Mitch in 1998 which caused much ecological damage.
