= Jennifer Ávila =

Honduran journalist (born 1990)

Jennifer Ávila Reyes
- Born: June 29, 1990; El Progreso, Yoro, Honduras
- Occupation(s): Journalist, documentary filmmaker

Jennifer Ávila Reyes (El Progreso, June 29, 1990) is a Honduran journalist, documentary filmmaker and researcher. In 2017, she founded the media company Contracorriente and is currently its director. Its primary aim is to uncover corruption and violence against children and women.

== Biography ==
Between 2011 and 2017 she wrote for The Washington Post, Divergentes, Distintas Latitudes and Noticias Aliadas. In 2017, together with Catherine Calderón, she founded the media firm Contracorriente, which as of 2023 has twenty employees in San Pedro Sula and Tegucigalpa.

== Works ==
=== Documentaries ===
- Guardiana de los ríos (2016)

== Awards and recognition ==
- In 2023, she received the Gabo Award for Excellence, which is awarded by Fundación Gabo
- Special mention for the 2021 Columbia University School of Journalism Maria Moors Cabot Award
- LASA Media Award in 2020
- Berta Cáceres Award from Dona'm Cine in 2017
- In 2014, the Honduran national communication award for equality and against violence against women
