= Sigre River =

Coordinates: 15.8019°N 84.6000°W

Location
- Country: Honduras

The Sigre River (Spanish pronunciation: [ˈsiɣɾe]) is a river in the Gracias a Dios Department, Honduras. It flows into the Brus Lagoon, which itself lies adjacent to the Caribbean Sea.

== See also ==
- List of rivers of Honduras
