= Nacaome River =

River in Honduras

- Location of the Nacaome River in Honduras

- Location of the river’s mouth in Honduras

Location
- Country: Honduras

Physical characteristics
- Source
  - location: Confluence of the Sonta River and Azacualpa River near Los Encuentros, Honduras; 13°47′19″N 87°42′46″W
- Mouth: Gulf of Fonseca, Pacific Ocean
  - location: Near San Lorenzo, Valle Department, Honduras; 13°25′00″N 87°36′13″W
  - elevation: 0 m (0 ft)
- Length: 110 km
- Basin size: 3,478 km²

Basin features
- River system: Pacific Ocean basin
- Tributaries: Sonta River, Azacualpa River

The Nacaome River (Spanish: Río Nacaome) is a river in the Pacific watershed of Honduras. It originates at the confluence of the Sonta River and the Azacualpa River. The river has a total length of approximately 110 km when including the full extent of the Azacualpa tributary, from its source in the Letaperique mountain range (14.01433°N 87.42460°W) to its confluence point at Los Encuentros (13°47′19″N 87°42′46″W), continuing to its mouth in the Gulf of Fonseca on the Pacific coast.

The Nacaome River basin covers an estimated area of 3,478 km². According to data from the Secretaría de Recursos Naturales y Ambiente de Honduras (Honduran Secretariat of Natural Resources and Environment), the basin area is estimated at 2,892 km².

== Hydroelectric plant ==
Upstream from the town of San Antonio de Flores lies the José Cecilio del Valle Multipurpose Dam, which includes a hydroelectric power plant. The regulated flow from the reservoir supplies drinking water to the municipalities of San Antonio de Flores, Pespire, Nacaome, and San Lorenzo, as well as more than 75 surrounding rural communities.

== See also ==
- List of rivers of Honduras
