= Guarajambala River =

River in Honduras

- Location of mouth

Location
- Country: Honduras

Physical characteristics
- Mouth: Lempa River
  - coordinates: 13°57′55″N 88°29′57″W

The Guarajambala River is a river in Honduras.

== See also ==
- List of rivers of Honduras
