= Tela River =

Coordinates: 15.7831°N 87.4544°W

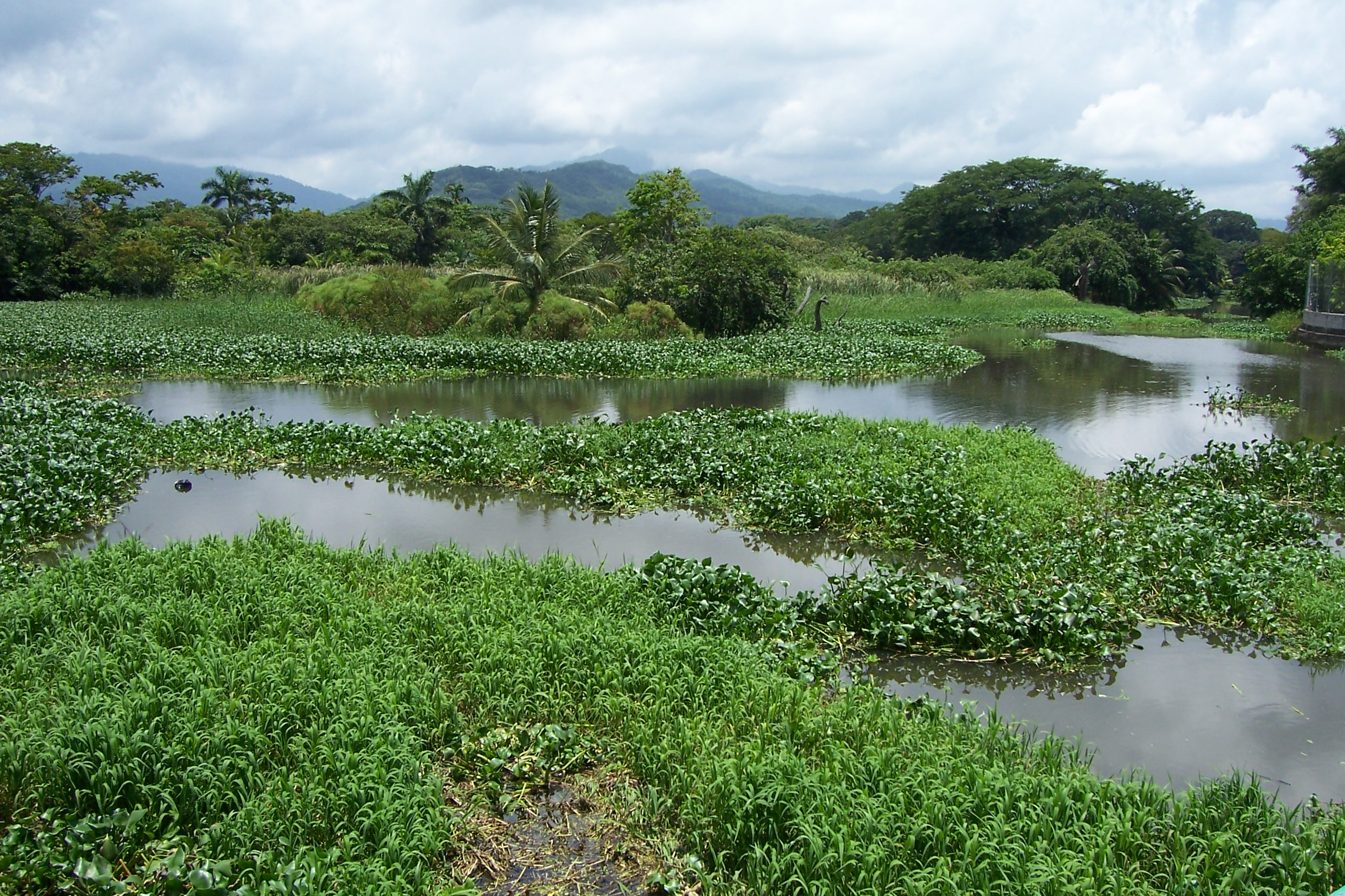
- Source of the Tela River

Location
- Country: Honduras

The Tela River or Río Tela is a river that runs through Tela, in Honduras, flowing into the Caribbean Sea. It begins in a marshy area inland and opens out near the sea.

== See also ==
- List of rivers of Honduras
