= Nakunta River =

Coordinates: 15.19754°N 83.76264°W

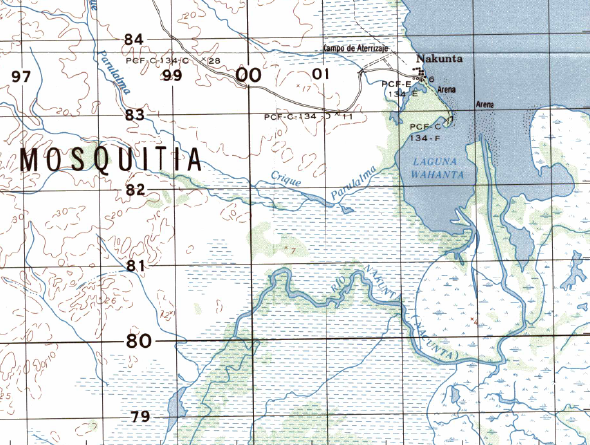
- Outlet of Nakunta River

Location
- Country: Honduras

The Nakunta River is a river in the Gracias a Dios Department of Honduras that exits into the Caratasca Lagoon a few miles south of Puerto Lempira. It is 115 kilometers (71 mi) in length.

The river starts in the La Mosquitia region of the Department and is famous locally for its abundance of lizards.

When the Sandinistas forced relocations of Miskito and Panamahka in Nicaragua in the early 1980s, many escaped to Honduras, ending up in refugee camps near the Nakunta river or in villages such as Mocorón.

Discussions of building a bridge over the river near the village of Tapanlaya were underway in 2019 as a part of oil exploration activities.

== See also ==
- List of rivers of Honduras
