= Cuero River =

Coordinates: 15.7772°N 87.0197°W

Location
- Country: Honduras

The Cuero River, also known as the Cuero and Salado River, is a river to the east of San Juan Pueblo and forming part of the Wildlife Refuge Cuero and Salada in Honduras.

== See also ==
- List of rivers of Honduras
