= Paulaya River =

Location
- Country: Honduras

Physical characteristics
- Mouth
  - coordinates: 15°50′06″N 85°03′33″W

The Paulaya River is a river in Honduras, a tributary of the Sico Tinto Negro River.

== Poyais Scheme ==
In 1822–1823, the river (under the name Rio Tinto / Black River) was at the centre of the fictional nation of Poyais invented by the confidence trickster Gregor MacGregor. The town of Poyais, capital of this nation, was claimed to be on its banks.

== See also ==
- List of rivers of Honduras
