= Esquilinchuche =

Village in Honduras

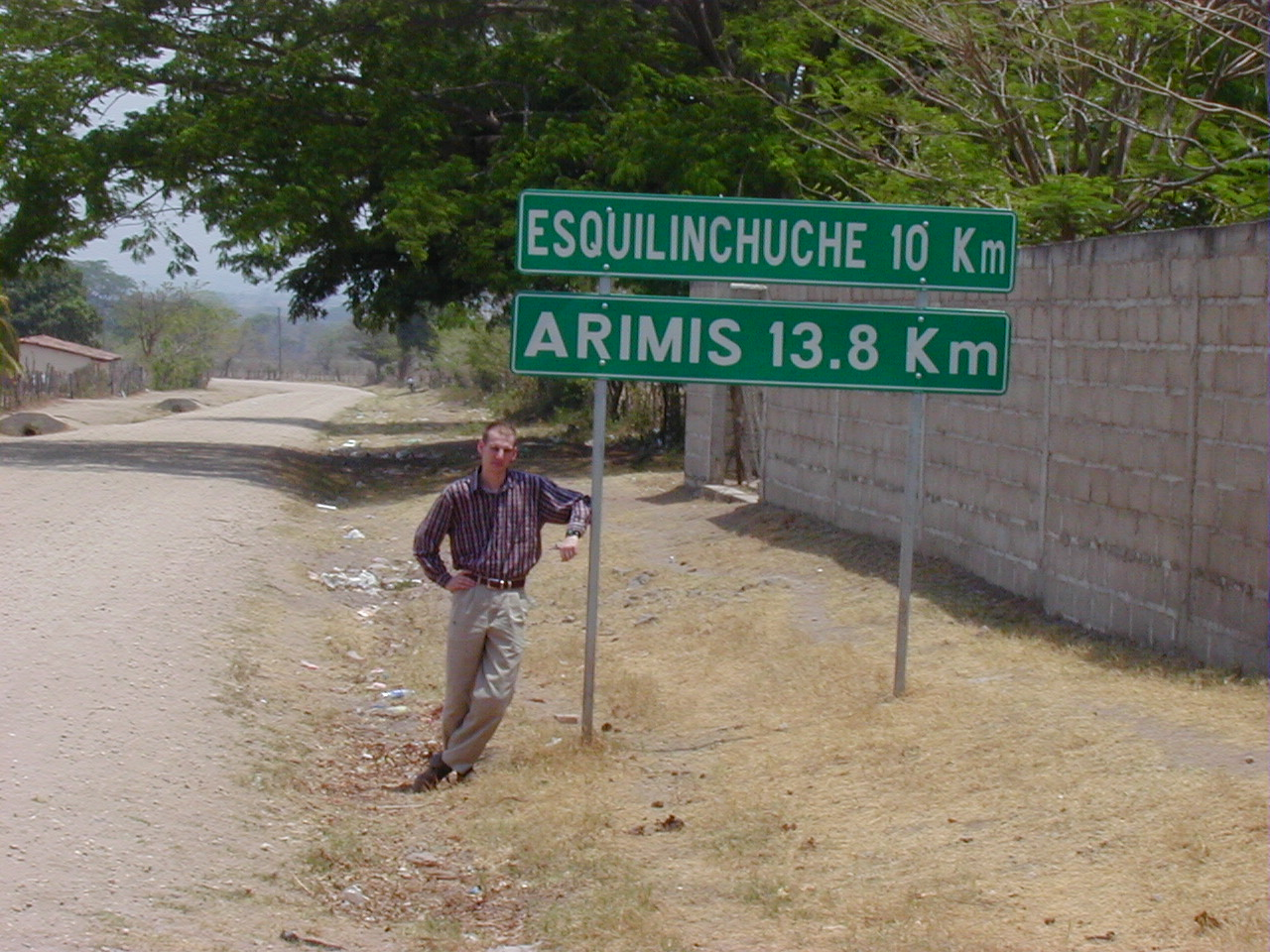
Sign on the road to Esquilinchuche

El Esquilinchuche is a small village in the municipality of Juticalpa, Olancho, Honduras.

== Topography and access ==
El Esquilinchuche is located on a low rise that forms the banks of the flood plain of the Guayape river that lies approximately 2 km to the south during the dry season, but comes to within 400 m during the annual monsoon floods.

Esquilinchuche is connected to the main Olancho highway from Jutiquile, via a loop consisting of 10 km of dirt road, passing through the other small towns of San Marcos de Jutiquile, and El Potrero de Casas, then through Esquilinchuche, continuing to loop back to the main highway via the highway junction closer to Catacamas leading through the small town of Arimis, by 6 km of dirt road. The villages of Las Tablas and La Pusunca can also be accessed through a connecting road junction in San Marcos de Jutiquile.

A temporary wooden toll bridge is set up every year during the dry season south of Esquilinchuche crossing the Guayape River and taken down during the wet season when the river grows from one that can be waded to a torrent that is often over 1 km in width.

== Government ==
Esquilinchuche is loosely governed by a local group of village elders known as the 'patronato'. There are no governmental offices of any kind to be found in Esquilinchuche or the surrounding small towns.

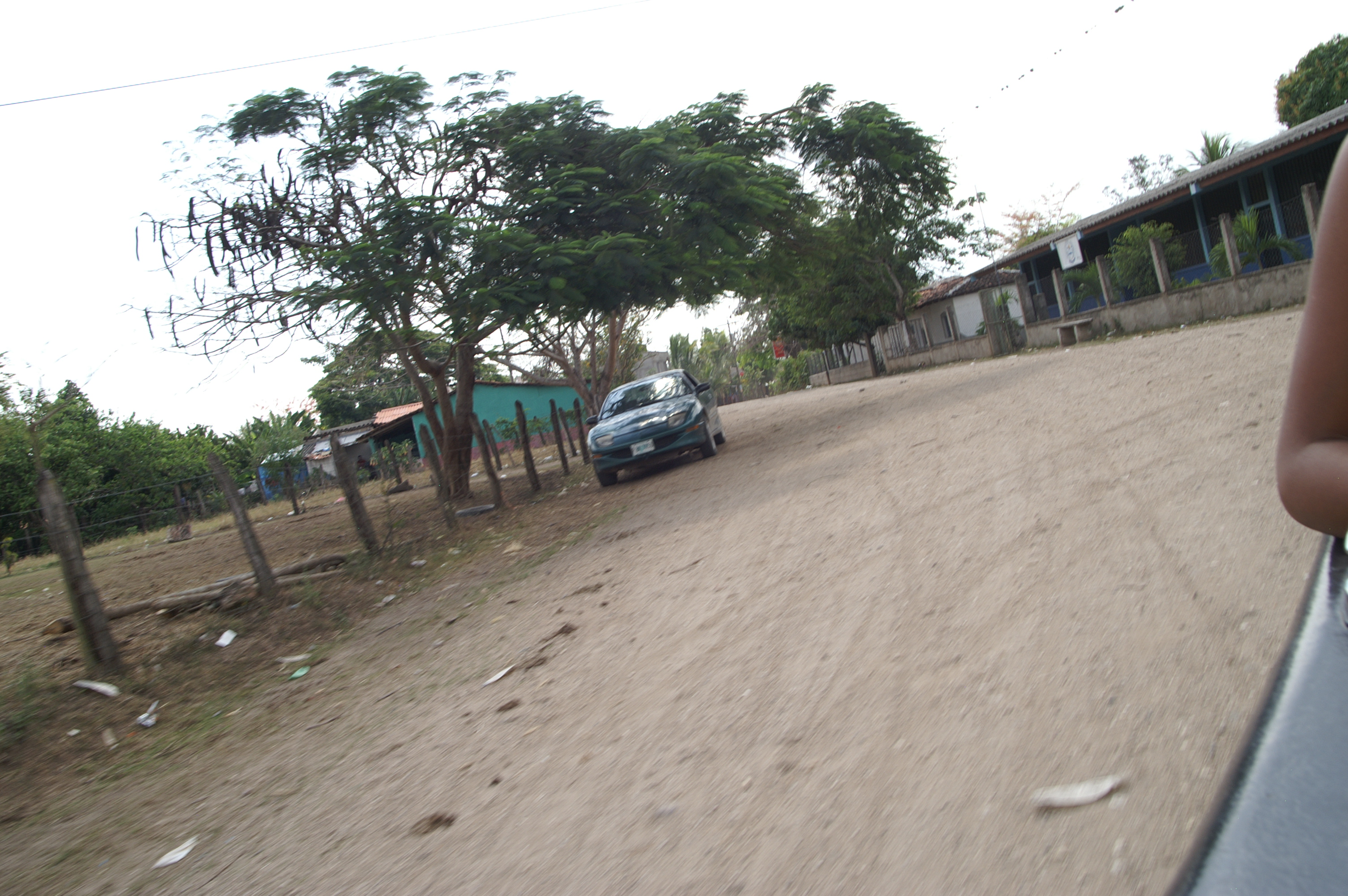
Main Street in Esquilinchuche with the school in the background - right.

== The name ==
El Esquilinchuche is known by its residents to be named for a large tree with sparse long leaves (approximately 1.5 × 8 inch) and prominent white five petaled flowers that once grew in abundance in the town. The Esquilinchuche tree has a very soft wood and is identifiable by the milky sap that oozes out when any branch is cut. Today there are no Esquilinchuche trees in El Esquilinchuche. The tree is said to be named for Esquiline Hill, one of the famous seven hills of Ancient Rome.

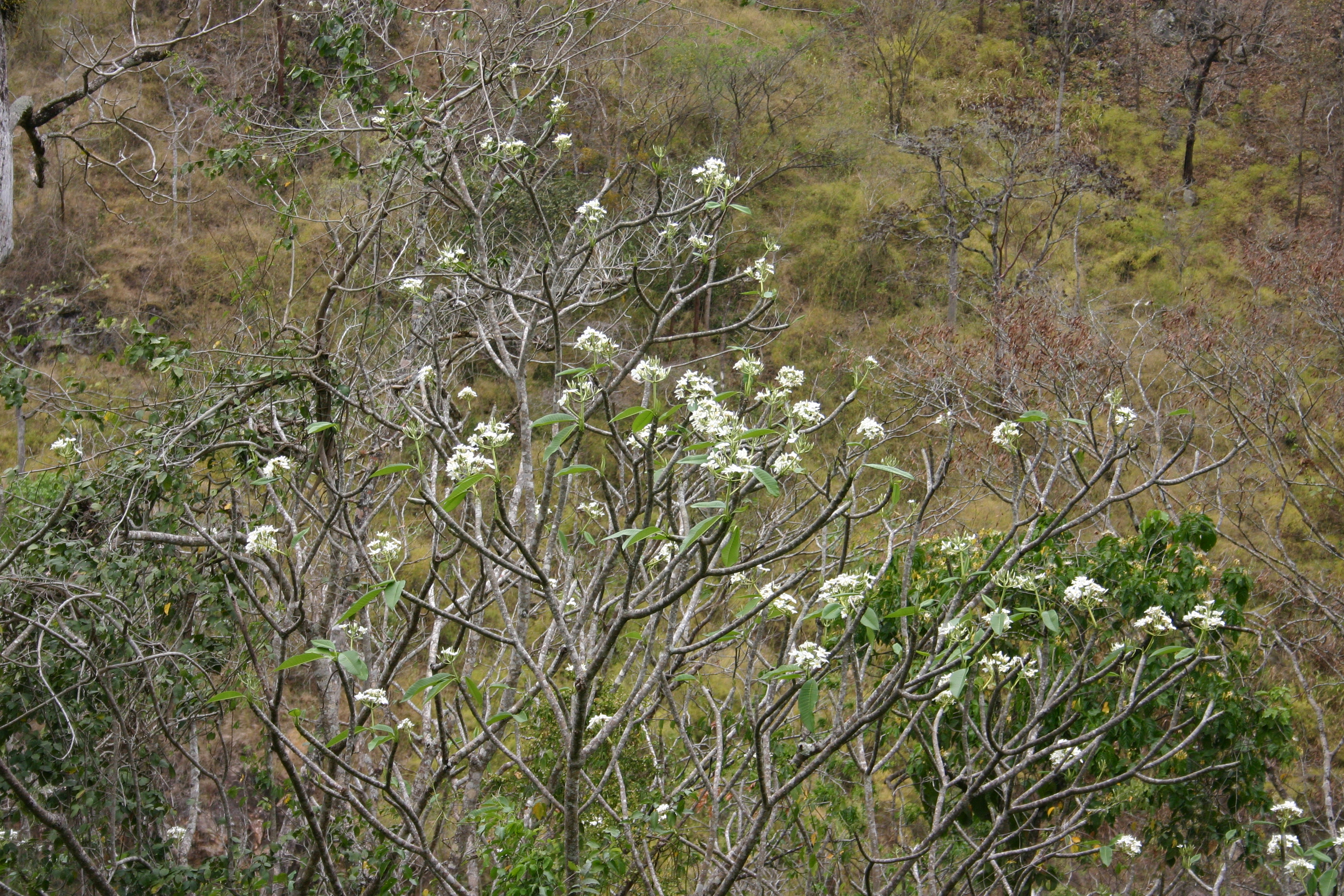
Esquilinchuche Tree

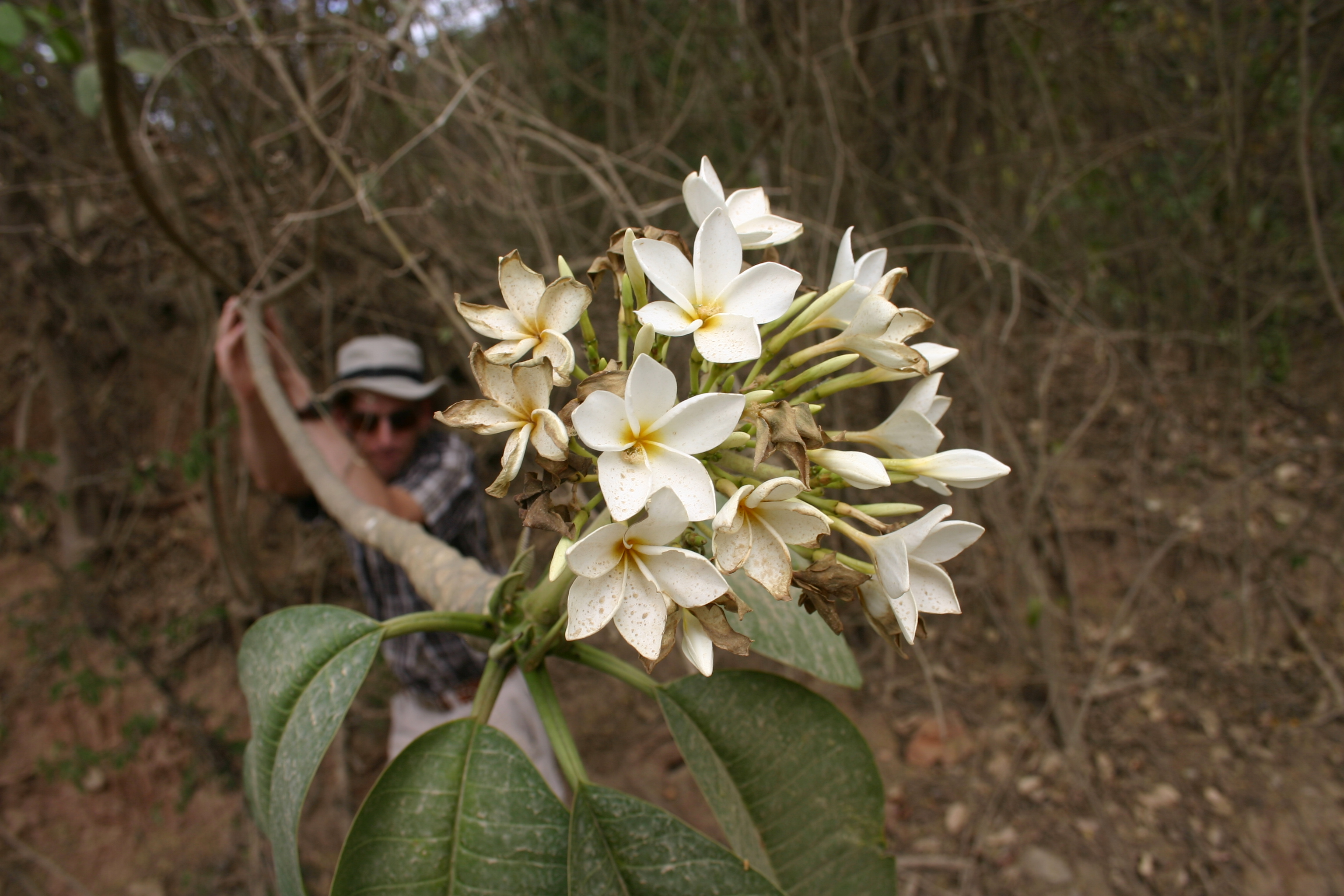
Flowers and leaves of the Esquilinchuche Tree

== Residents and town amenities ==
The residents of this mostly agricultural community for the most part dedicate themselves to agricultural pursuits. The several small stores ("pulperias") are set in the living rooms of houses. There are no lodging or other amenities to be found other than freshly prepared foods occasionally offered by some pulperias. El Esquilinchuche boasts a fine Catholic church, an elementary school, a large soccer field, and good quality residential freshwater from a water tower or "pila" set on a low hill next to the Rivera ranch. Electricity first came to the community in the early 1990s. Cell phones now are in common use among the residents of this town that in 2005 boasted one telephone.

During Hurricane Mitch in 1998 the Guayape river lapped at the edges of the town, swallowing three residences that had been built a few feet below the level of the rest of the town. Other than some livestock, there were no fatalities.

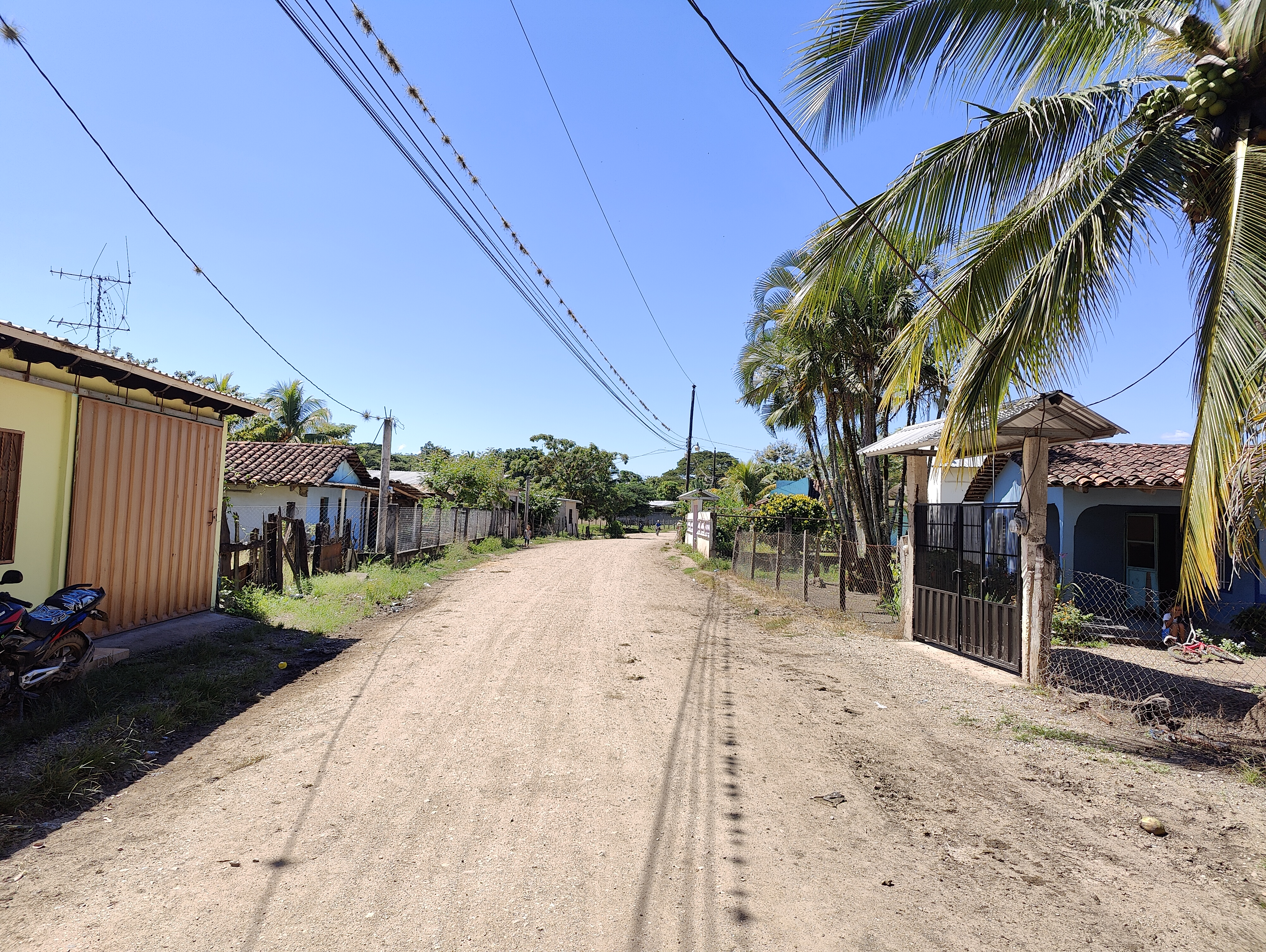
Main Street Esquilinchuche

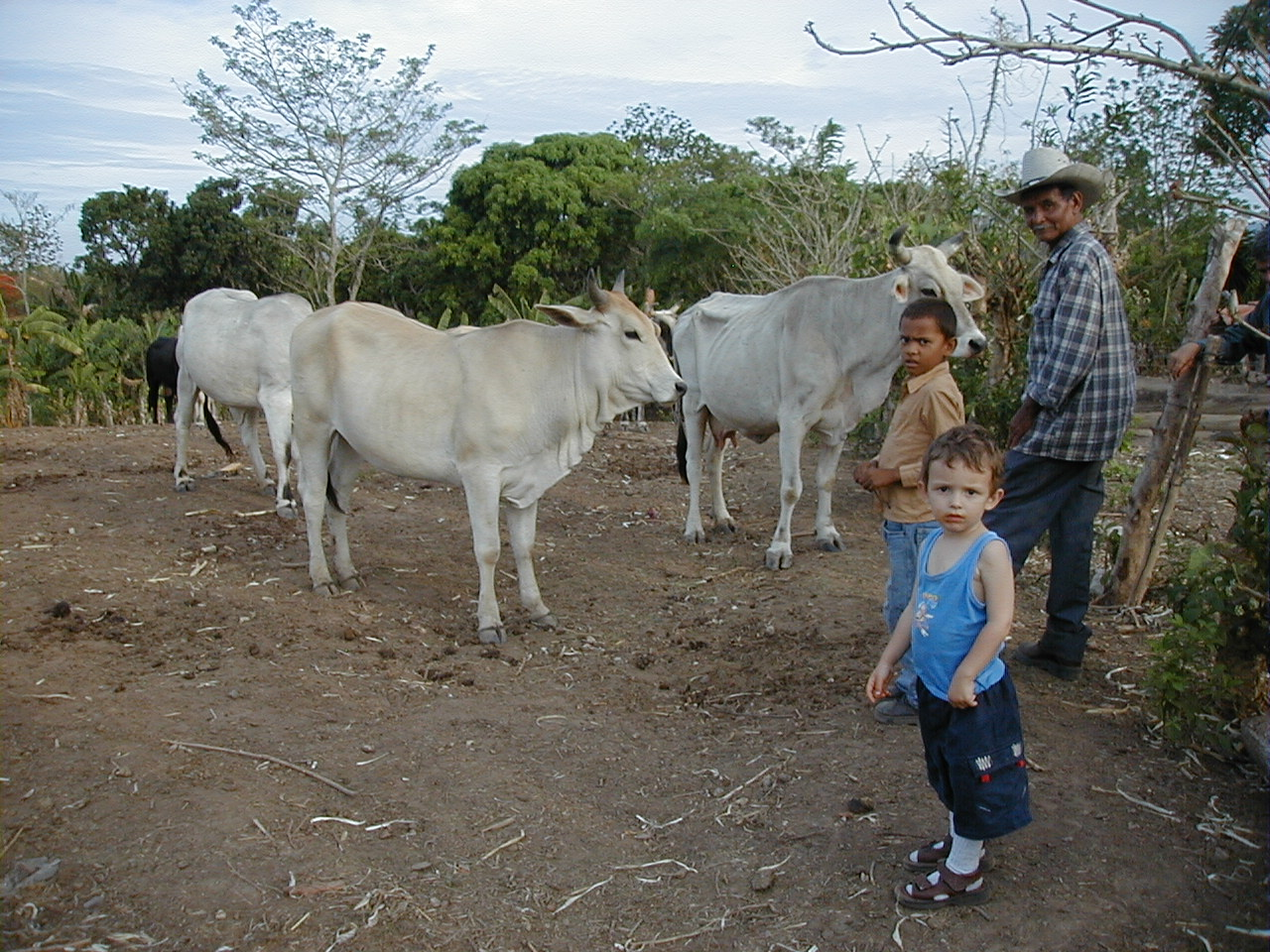
A member of the Esquilinchuche patronato with some of his grandchildren and cattle

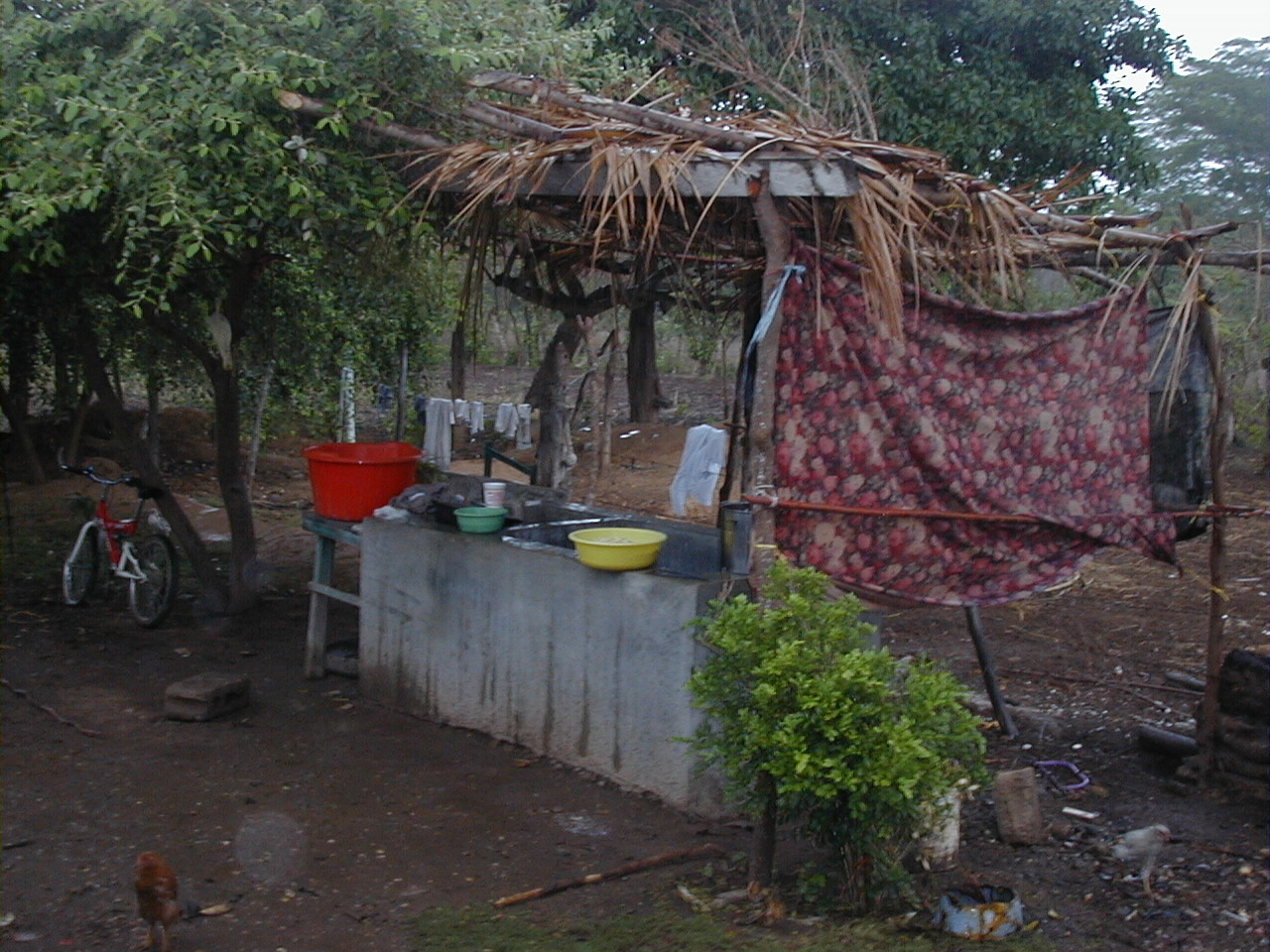
A pila, commonly used for washing both clothing and dishes in Honduras

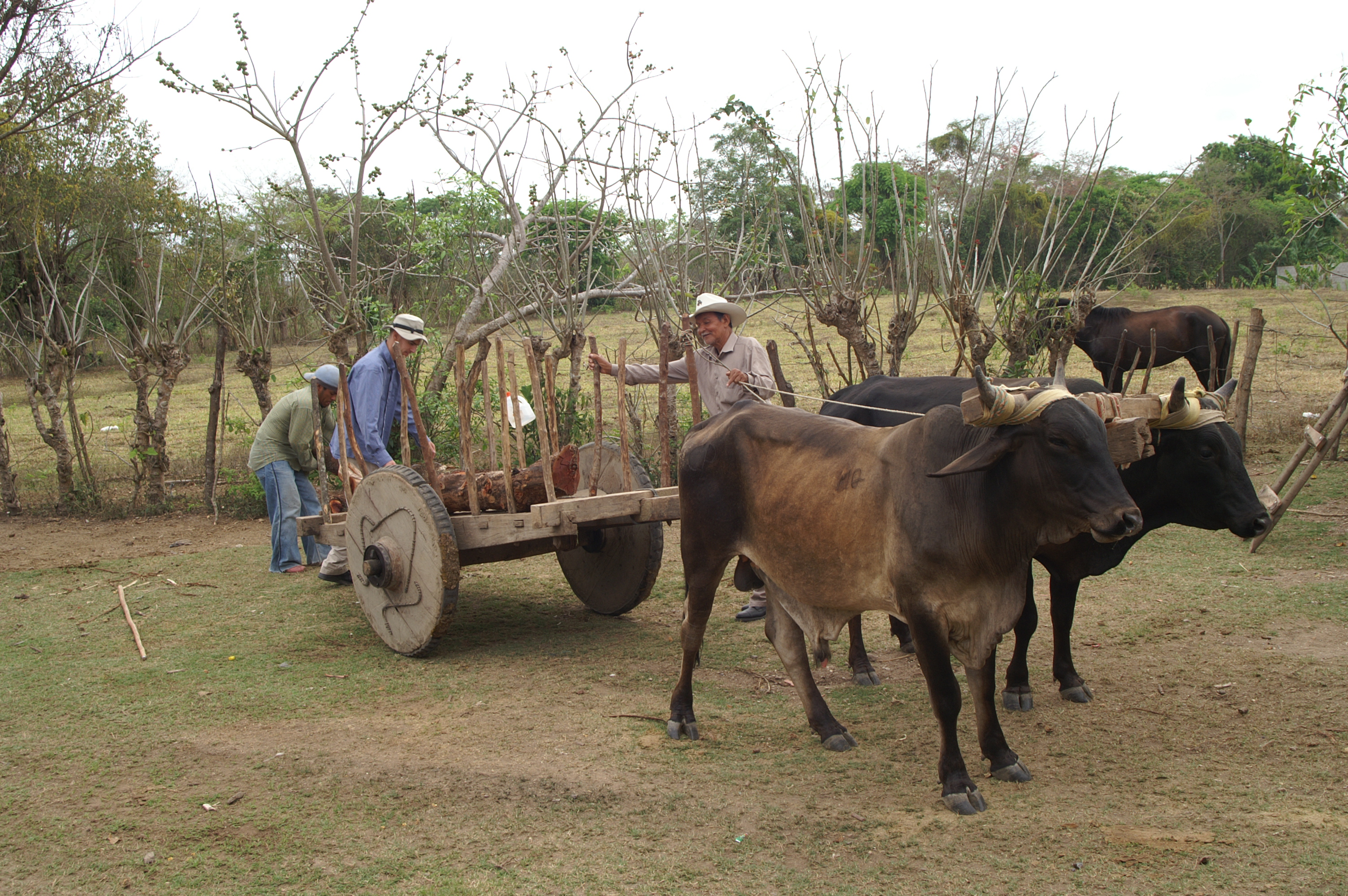
Delivery of some 'Carbon' posts in Esquilinchuche

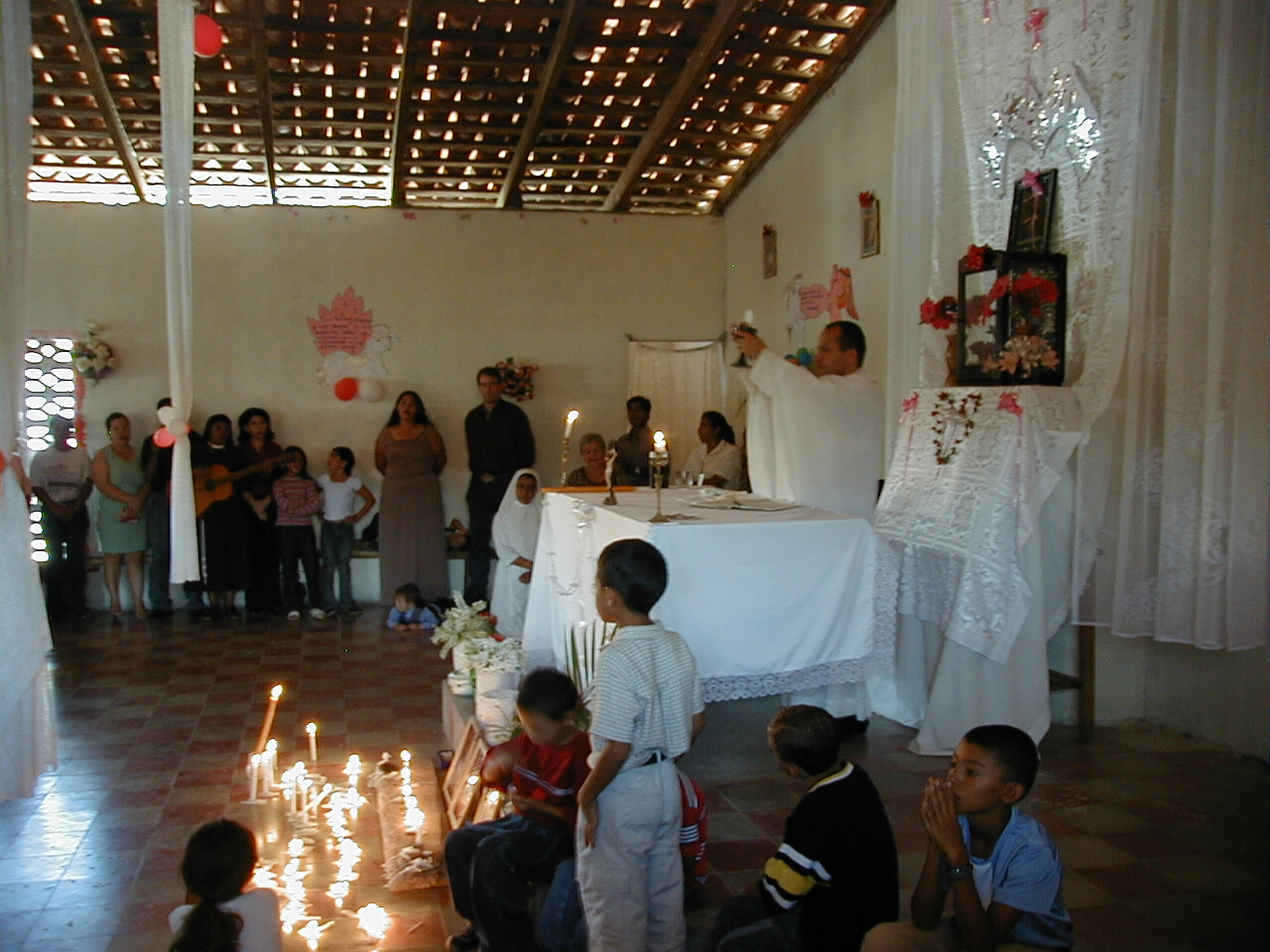
A baptism ceremony in El Esquilinchuche

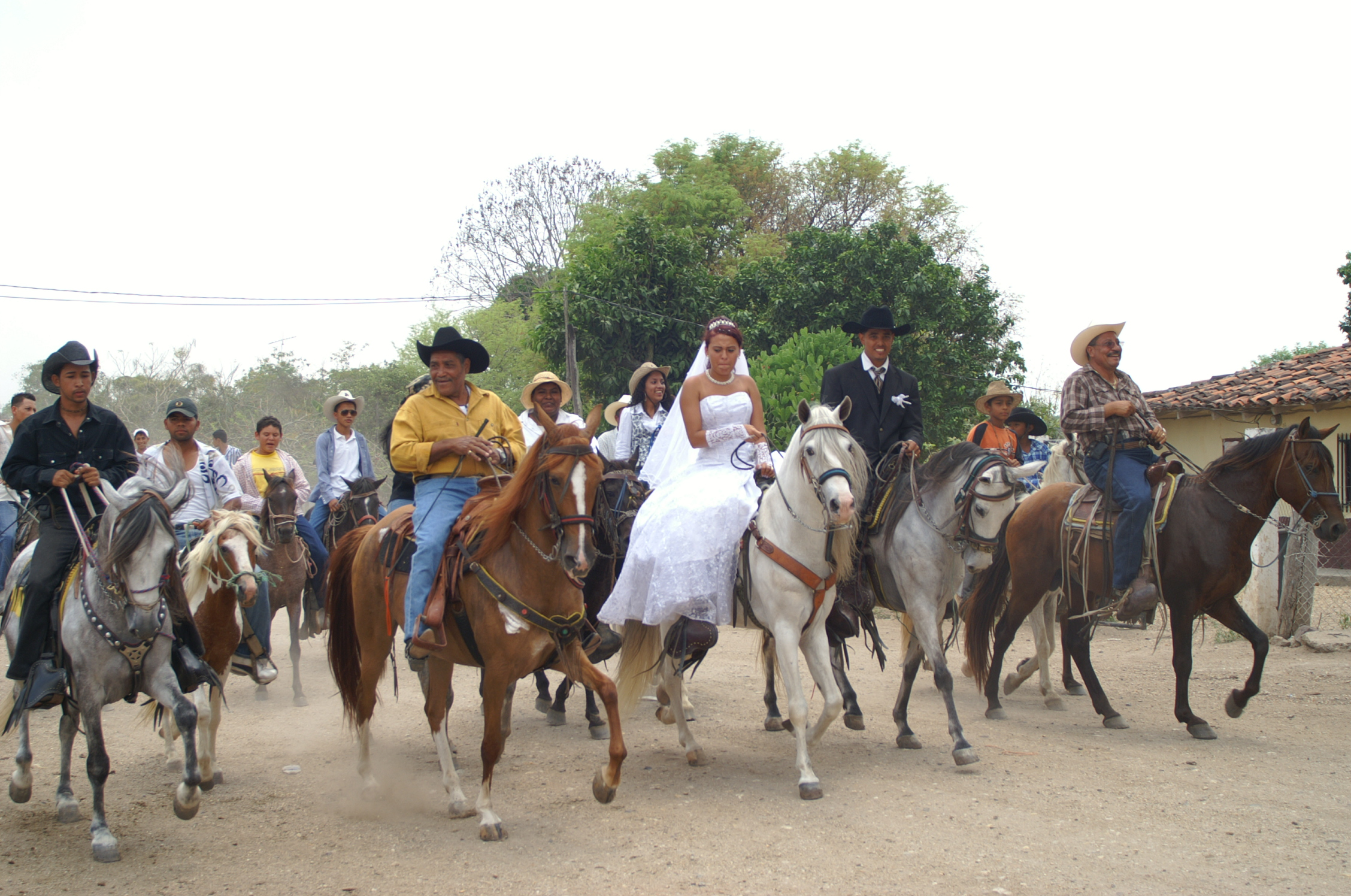
An Esquilinchuche wedding parade in April 2008, the main ceremony was held in Juticalpa

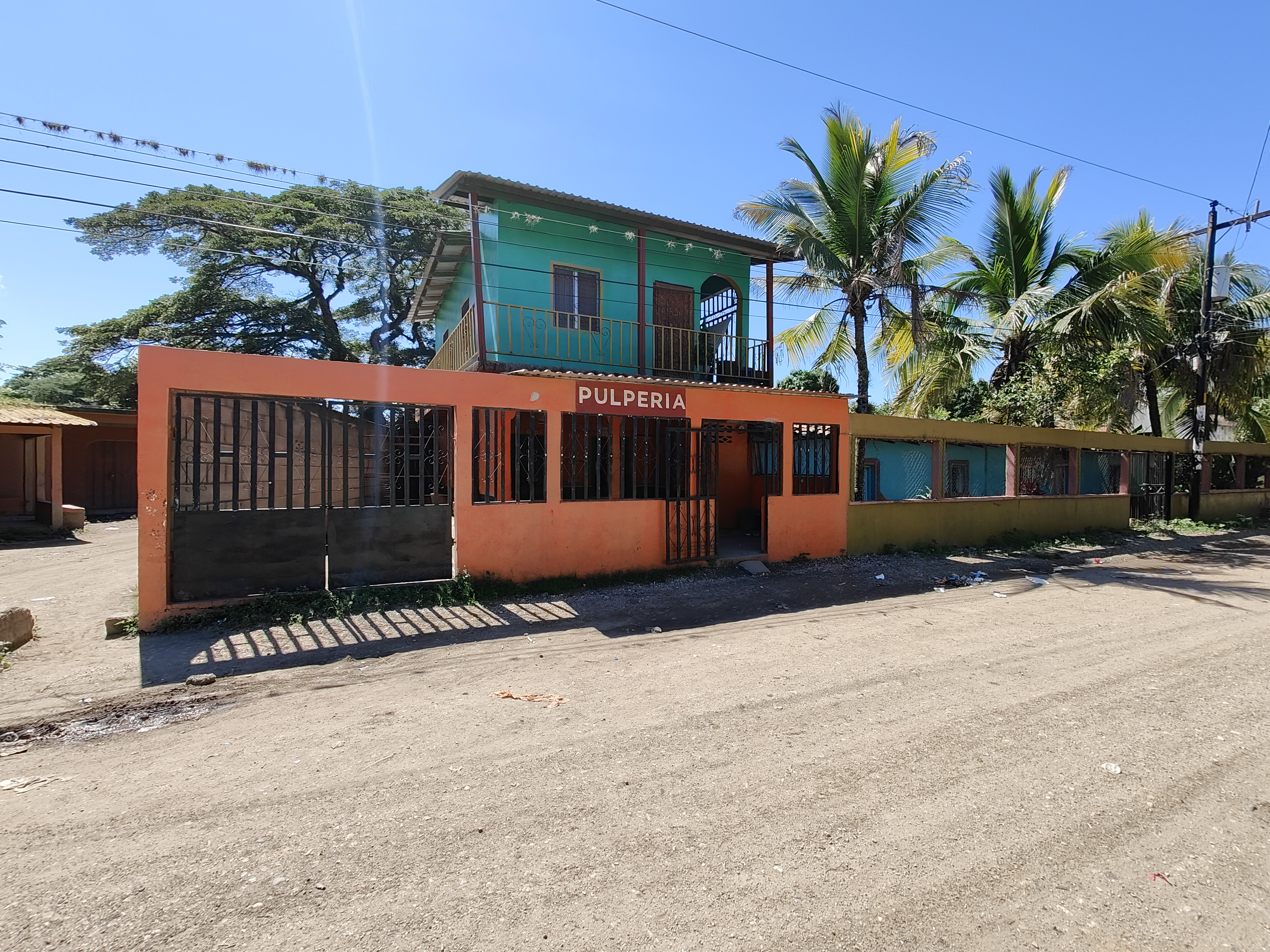
One of the businesses in central Esquilinchuche

== Sports Facility ==
The town gathering place is a full size campo de Futbol where people can be seen playing futbol at all times of the day and evening. Larger town events use this sports area.

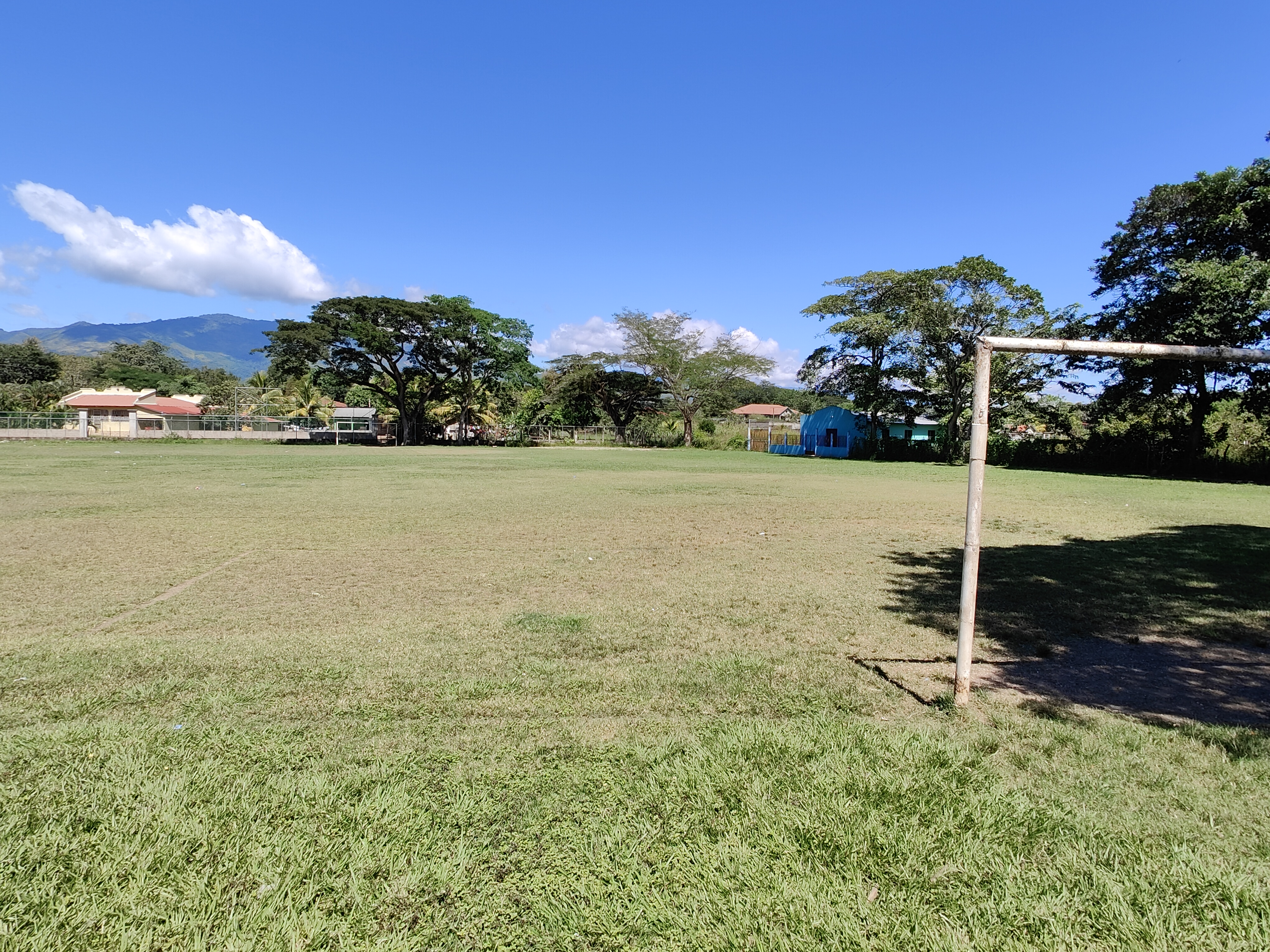
Soccer Field in Esquilinchuche

== School ==
Esquilinchuche has a primary school. Middle and High School students travel to surrounding communities like Catacamas and Juticalpa.

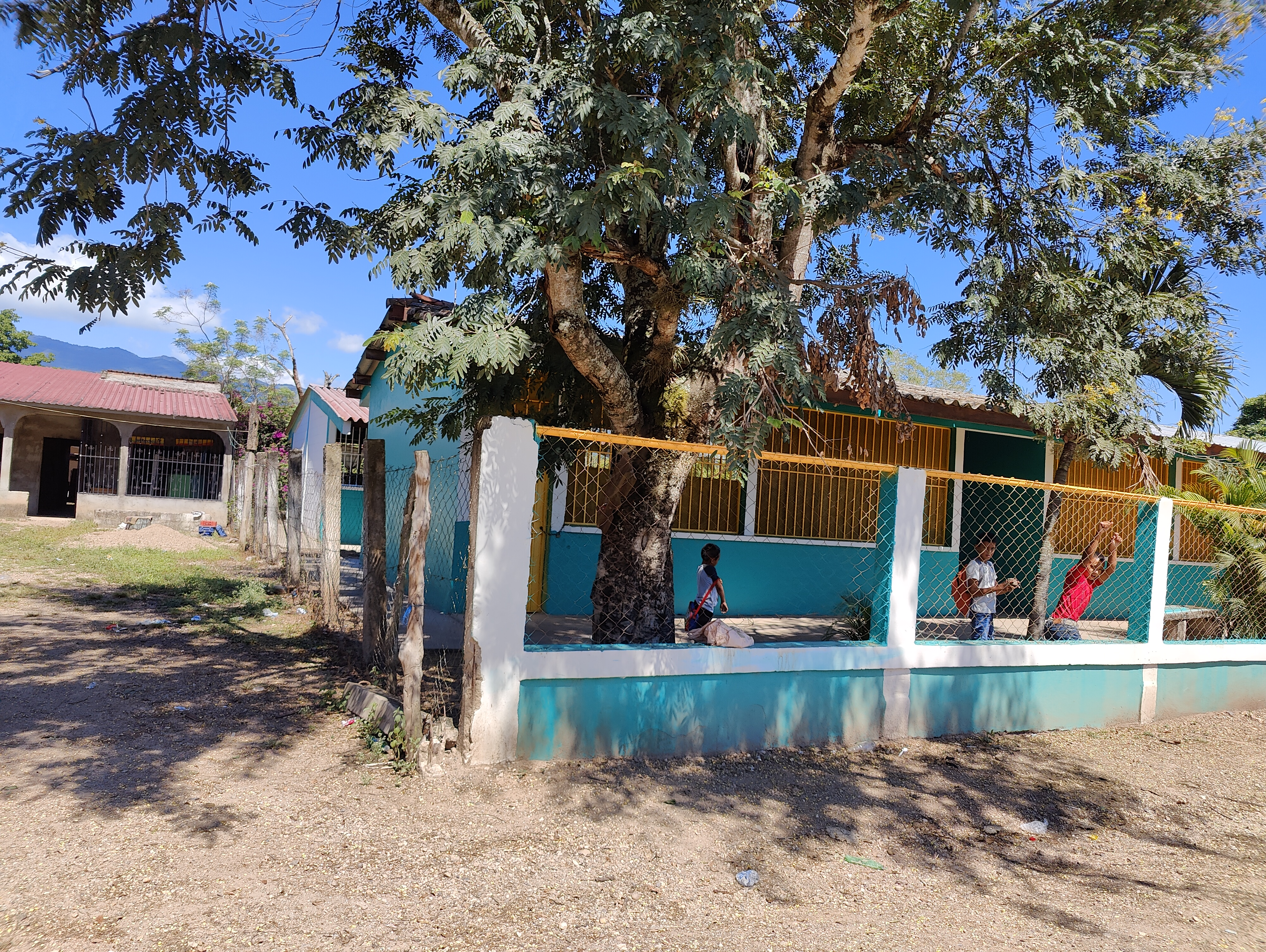
Primary School side view

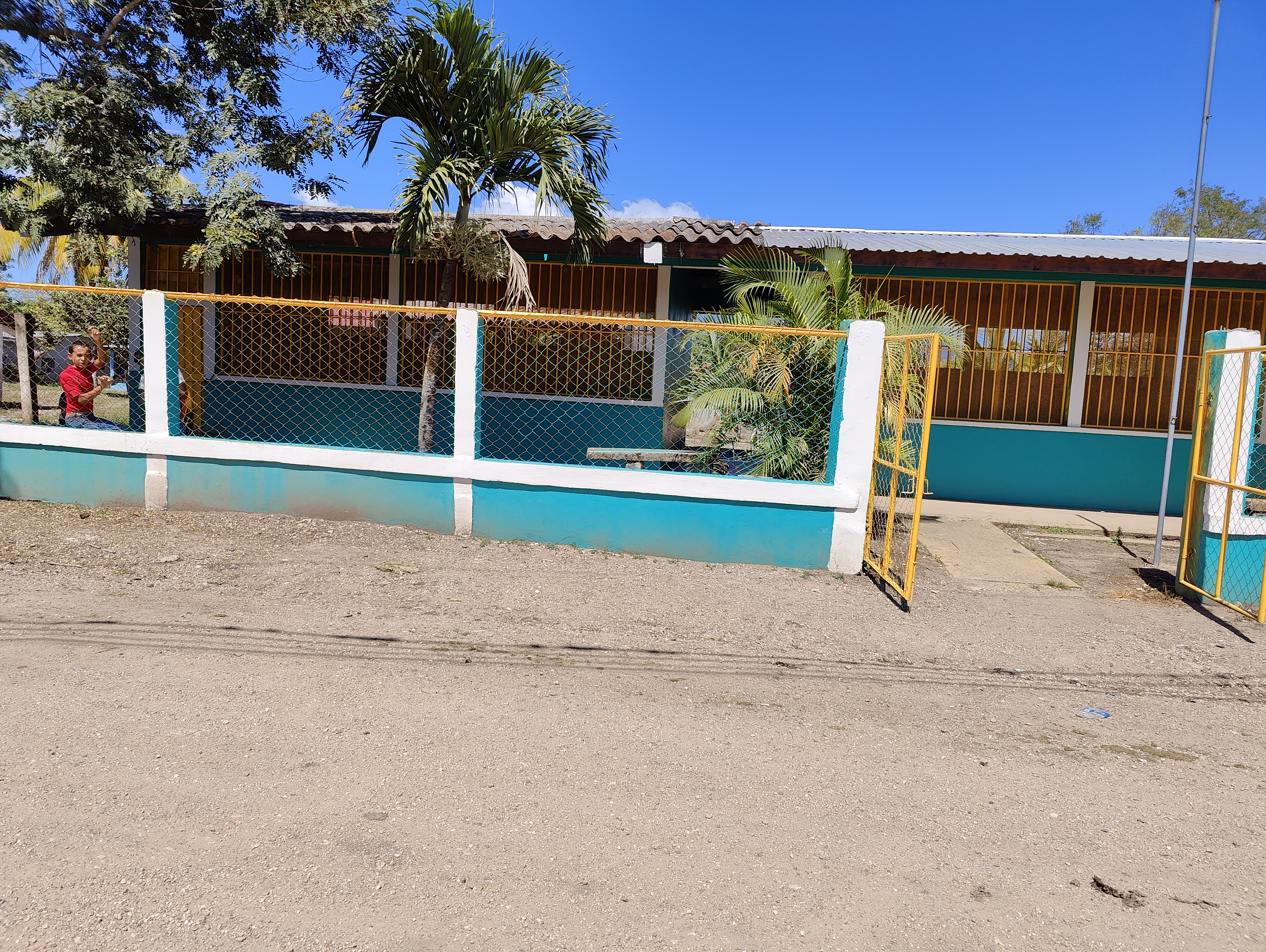
Primary School Front
