= Copprome Orphanage =

Orphanage in El Progreso, Honduras

Copprome Orphanage (est. 1989) is a Catholic orphanage in El Progreso, Honduras. Copprome orphanage is a home of last resort for Honduran children who need a safe haven. It provides food, shelter, and education to over 40 orphans, both boys and girls ranging from 2–17 years old. Copprome Orphanage was founded in 1989 by Sister Teresita Gonzalez and the citizens of El Progreso.

Copprome Orphanage has seen fundraising efforts by people from the United States. Charlie Proctor, from Durham, Connecticut, raised over $20,000 and created an ongoing foundation to help the orphanage.
