= Papaloteca River =

Coordinates: 15.8158°N 86.5028°W

Location
- Country: Honduras

The Papaloteca River is a river whose mouth runs through Nueva Armenia, in Honduras, flowing into the Caribbean Sea.

== See also ==
- List of rivers of Honduras
