= Warunta River =

Coordinates: 15.4014°N 84.1206°W

Location
- Country: Honduras

The Warunta River (Spanish pronunciation: [waˈɾunta]) is a river in the Gracias a Dios Department of Honduras that flows into the Warunta Lagoon adjoining the larger Caratasca Lagoon, beside the Caribbean Sea.

== See also ==
- List of rivers of Honduras
