= Guayape River =

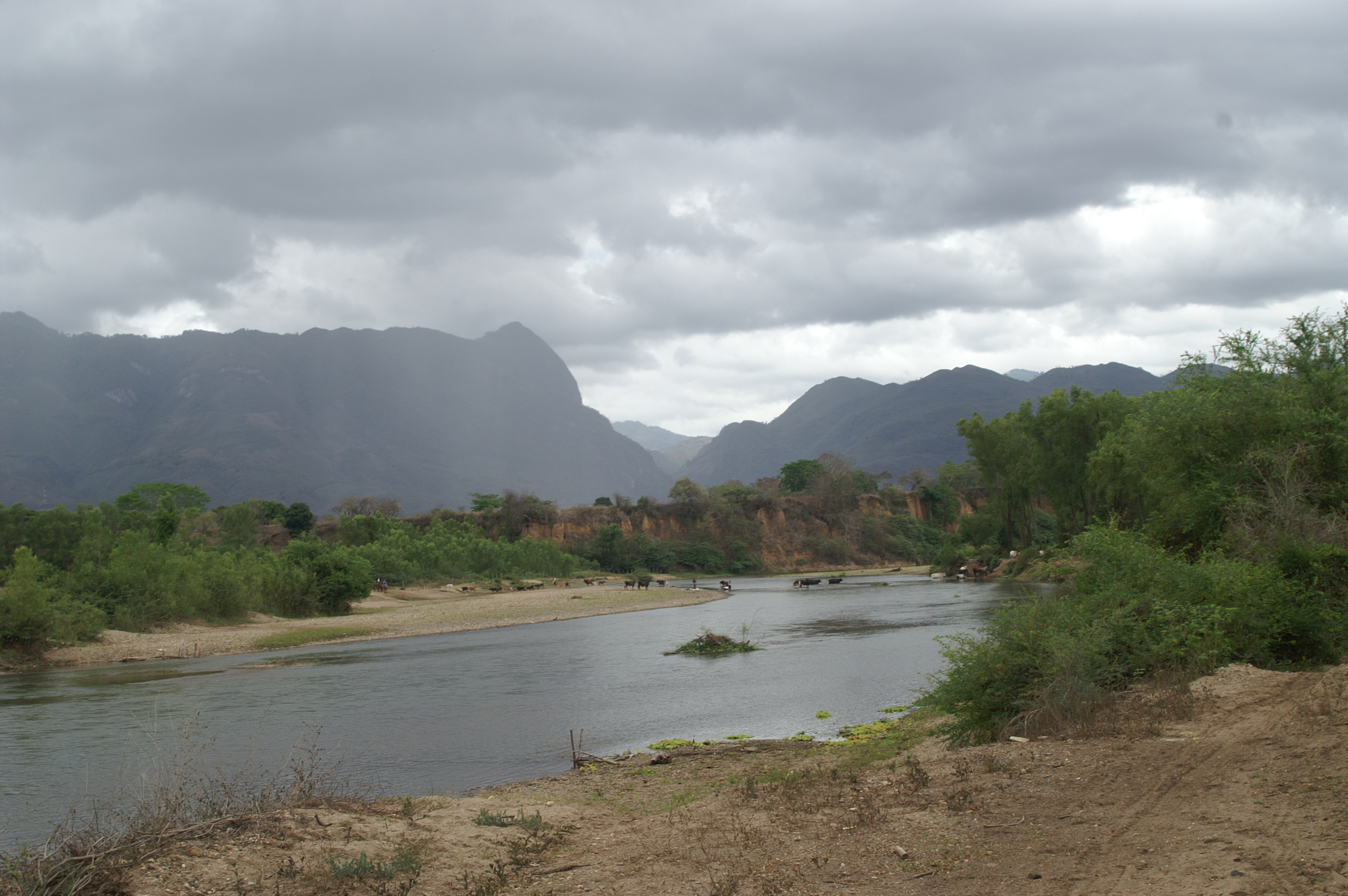

The Guayape River (Spanish: Río Guayape) is a major river that drains much of the Department of Olancho and central Honduras. The largest tributary to the Guayape is the Río Jalán, which joins it at El Plomo, not far from the town of Juticalpa. From there the river passes many small towns, including El Esquilinchuche. The largest bridge over the Guayape is the Puente del Burro, a modern cement structure that replaced the huge steel suspension bridge that had stood for decades after being built by the US Army Corps of Engineers, and was destroyed by Hurricane Mitch in 1998. Far downriver from the bridge, the Guayape joins with the Guayambre River, from then on the waterway is known as the Río Patuca.

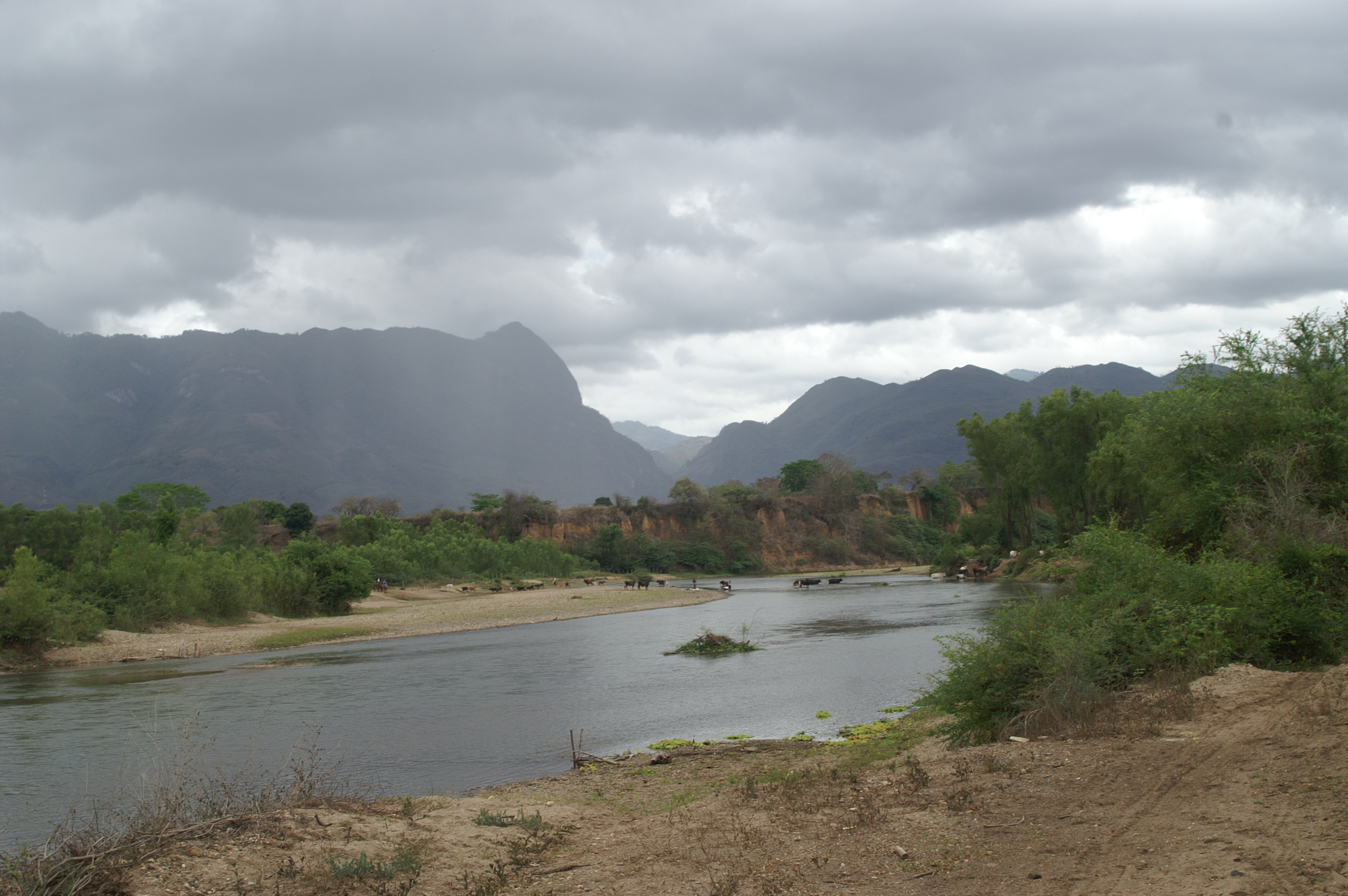
The Río Guayape near Esquilinchuche, facing El Boquerón in the Sierra de Agalta

The Río Guayape, taken from the Puente del Burro in the municipality of Catacamas
