= Yaguala River =

Location
- Country: Honduras

The Yaguala River (Spanish pronunciation: [ɟʝaˈɣwala]) is a river in Honduras.

== See also ==
- List of rivers of Honduras
