= Mocal River =

River in Honduras

- Location of mouth

Location
- Country: Honduras

Physical characteristics
- Mouth: Lempa River
  - coordinates: 14°01′17″N 88°38′08″W

The Mocal River is a river in Honduras. It flows into the Lempa River. An eight megawatt hydroelectric plant is planned on the river.

== See also ==
- List of rivers of Honduras
