= Cangrejal River =

Coordinates: 15.7994°N 87.7764°W

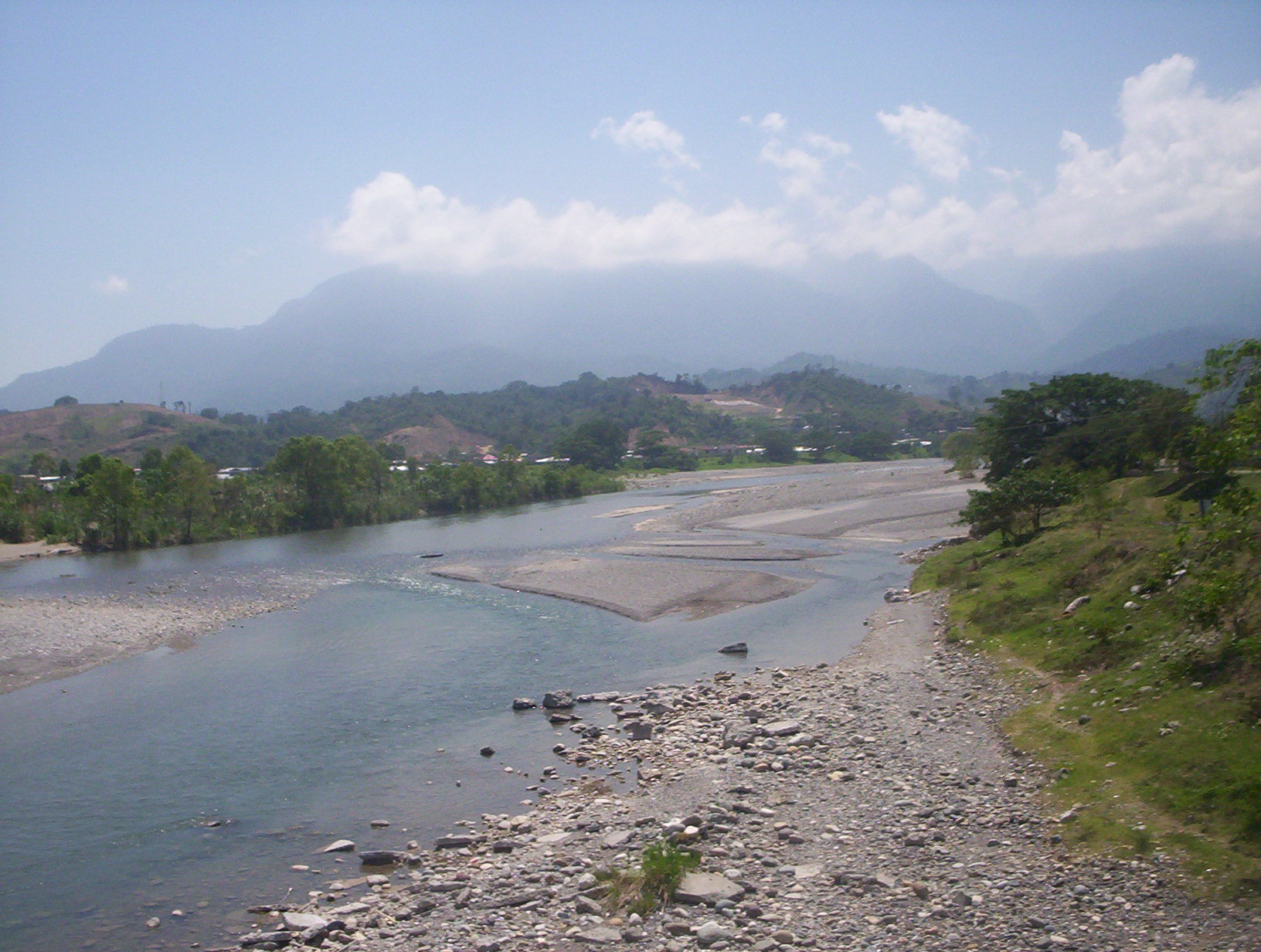
- Cangrejal River

Location
- Country: Honduras

The Cangrejal River, or Río Cangrejal, is a river that drains several mountain tributaries and borders the rainforest of Pico Bonito National Park near La Ceiba, Honduras. The Cangrejal is formed by the merger of three rivers: Rio Viejo, Rio Yaruca, and Blanco River.

== History ==
In 1770, during the time of the Kingdom of Guatemala, beginning just beyond the city itself to the west and looking east, and comprising, on the part of the South Sea, the Cangrejal River was previously known and mapped as Rio Colorado.

In 2024, due to Tropical Storm Sara, a bridge in La Ceiba collapsed into the river.

== See also ==
- List of rivers of Honduras
