= Danto River =

River in Honduras

Coordinates: 15.7739°N 89.8217°W

Location
- Country: Honduras

The Danto River or Río Danto is a river whose mouth comes out on the western side of La Ceiba, Honduras.

== See also ==
- List of rivers of Honduras
