= Otoro River =

Coordinates: 14.9769°N 88.2608°W

Location
- Country: Honduras

The Otoro River, also known as the Grande de Otoro River, is a river in Honduras which begins in the department of Intibucá and then becomes the Ulúa River in the Santa Barbara Department.

One of its more famous tributaries is the Río Gualcarque. This river is the proposed site for the Agua Zarca Dam, which came to international prominence when Berta Cáceres was assassinated for her work opposing this dam.

== See also ==
- List of rivers of Honduras
