= Leán River =

Coordinates: 15.8325°N 87.3197°W

Location
- Country: Honduras

The Leán River is a river on the northern Caribbean coast of Honduras slightly to the east of Tela, bordering the Punta Izopo National Park, in Atlántida Department.

== See also ==
- List of rivers of Honduras
