= Sico Tinto Negro River =

Location
- Country: Honduras

Physical characteristics
- Mouth
  - coordinates: 15°57′22″N 84°55′04″W

The Sico Tinto Negro (Spanish pronunciation: [ˈsiko ˈtinto ˈneɣɾo]) is a river in Honduras.

== See also ==
- List of rivers of Honduras
