= Mocorón River =

Location
- Country: Honduras

The Mocorón River is a river located in Honduras.

== See also ==
- List of rivers of Honduras
