= Sulaco River =

Location
- Country: Honduras

The Sulaco River is a river in Honduras.

== See also ==
- List of rivers of Honduras
