= La Quebradona =

Coordinates: 14°41′N 89°05′W

La Quebradona (Spanish pronunciation: [la keβɾaˈðona]) is a river located in Ocotepeque Department, Honduras.

The Rio La Quebradona rises in the department of Ocotepeque, near the village of Las Minito. It flows northwest from the Cordillera del Merendón, north from Mount El Naripio, and the eastern flanks of Cerro La Minas. It flows into the El Playón river, a tributary of the Jupilingo.
