= Guayambre River =

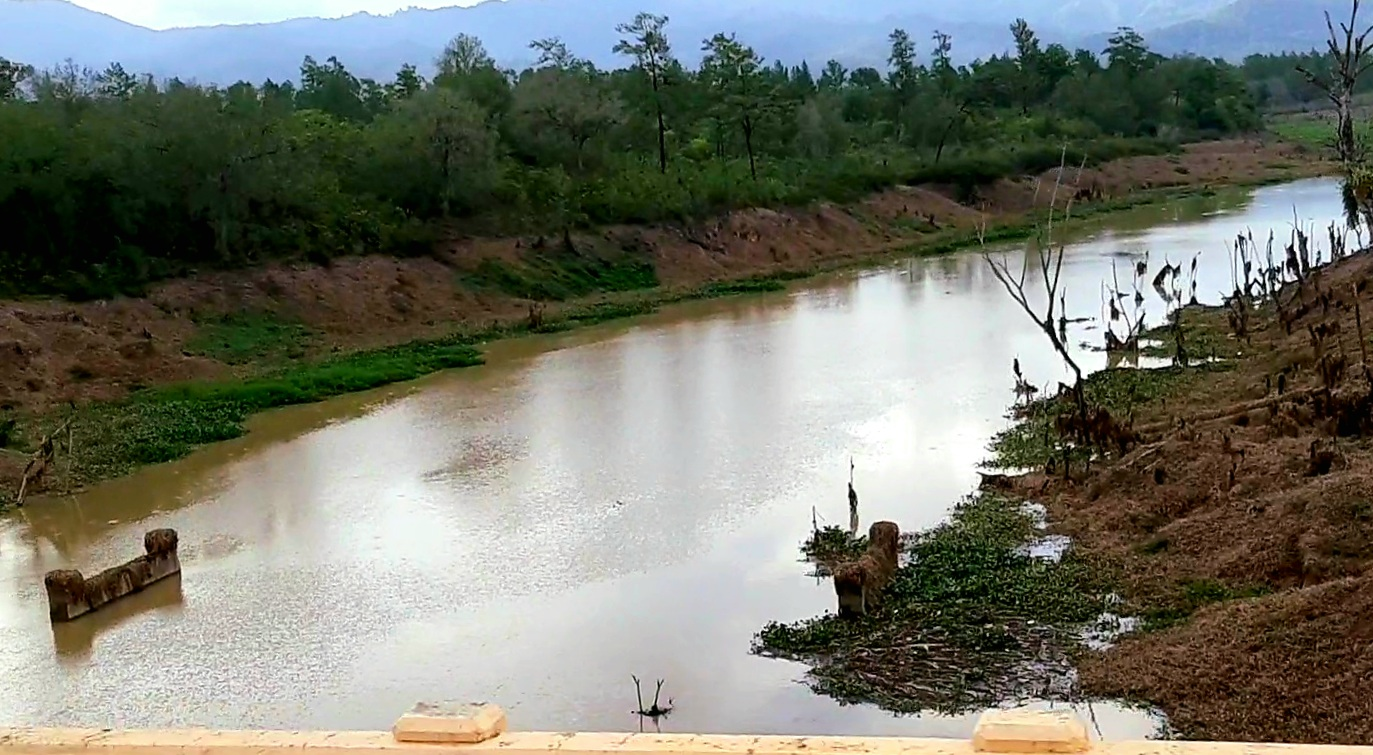
- Guayambre river

Location
- Country: Honduras

The Guayambre River is a river in Honduras. It is one of the two main tributaries of Honduras' longest river, the Patuca.

== See also ==
- List of rivers of Honduras
