= Higuito River =

Location
- Country: Honduras

The Higuito River (Spanish pronunciation: [iˈɣito]) is a river in Honduras.

== See also ==
- List of rivers of Honduras
