= Jalan River =

Coordinates: 15.71593°N 86.50109°W

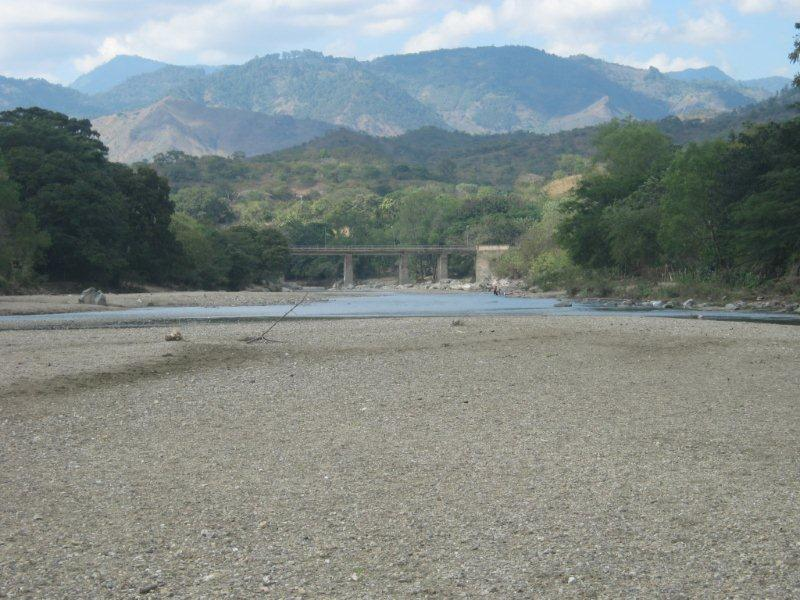
- Jalan River

Location
- Country: Honduras

The Jalan River is a river in Honduras.

== See also ==
- List of rivers of Honduras
