= Blanco River (Honduras) =

Río Blanco

Location
- Country: Honduras

The Río Blanco is a river in Honduras. This flows northwards through San Pedro Sula and empties its waters into the Ulúa River.

== See also ==
- List of rivers of Honduras
