= Sico River =

Location
- Country: Honduras

The Sico River is a river in Honduras. It was historically called the Black River or Rio Tinto.

== See also ==
- List of rivers of Honduras
