= Santa Rita, Yoro =

Santa Rita
- Municipality
- Location in Honduras
- Coordinates: 15°12′N 87°53′W
- Country: Honduras
- Department: Yoro

Area
  - Total: 129 km^{2} (50 sq mi)

Population (2023 projection)
  - Total: 21,536
  - Density: 167/km^{2} (432/sq mi)
- Time zone: UTC-6 (Central America)

Santa Rita is a town and a municipality in the Honduran department of Yoro. The Humuya River passes through it.

The town of Santa Rita has a population of 15,230 (2023 calculation).

In 1684, it was a hamlet called Benque La Laguneta. It later became the village of Santa Rita El Negrito. The place was established as a town in 1959 with part of the municipality of El Negrito.

== Demographics ==
At the time of the 2013 Honduras census, Santa Rita municipality had a population of 20,301. Of these, 89.73% were Mestizo, 9.20% White, 0.77% Black or Afro-Honduran, 0.17% Indigenous and 0.12% others.
