= Humuya River =

Location
- Country: Honduras

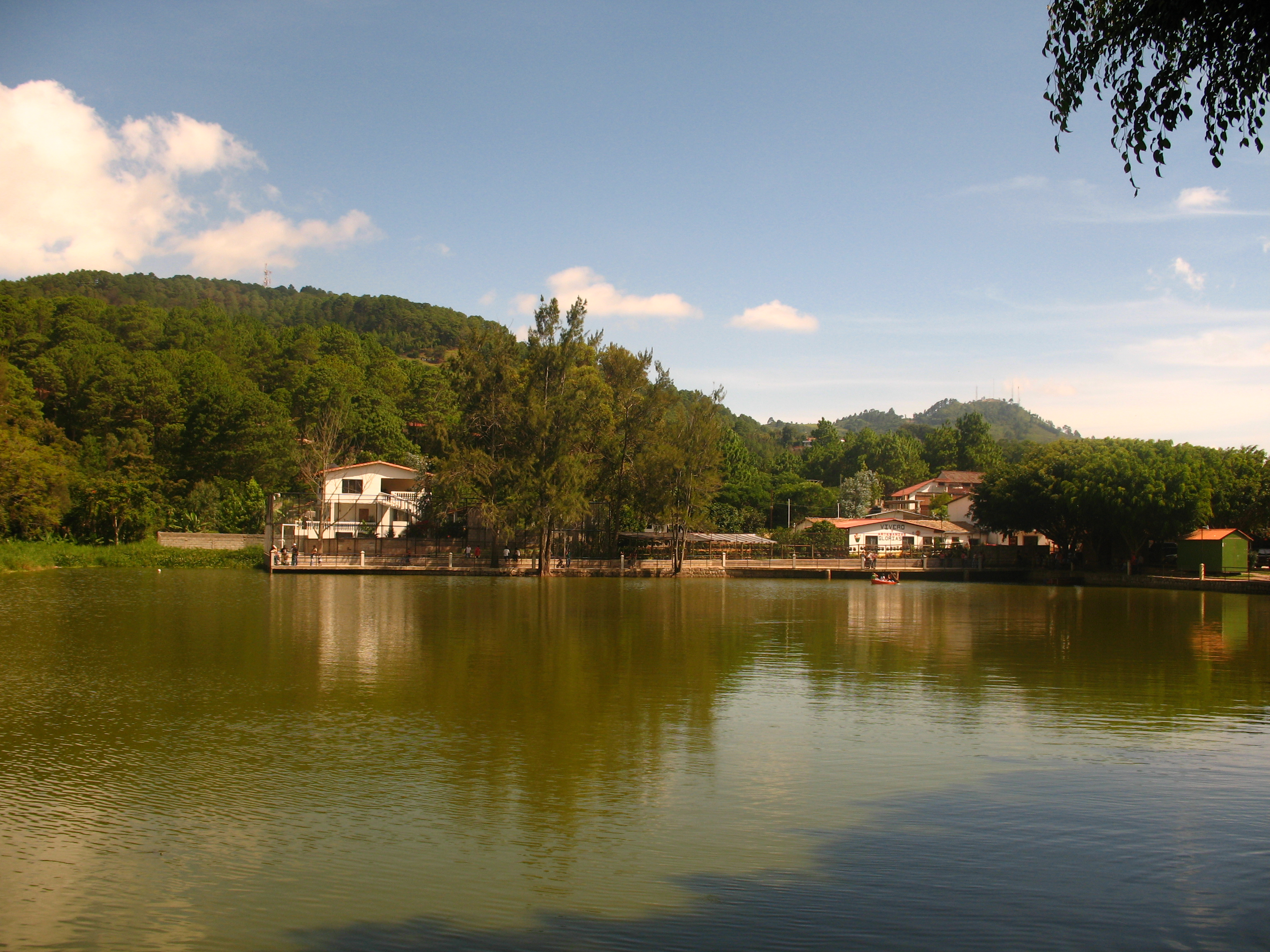
Photograph of the small lake in Santa Lucia Francisco Morazan, Honduras.

The Humuya River (Spanish pronunciation: [uˈmuʝa]) is a river in Honduras which passes through Santa Rita, Yoro, and then flows into the Ulúa River.

== See also ==
- List of rivers of Honduras
