= Patuca River =

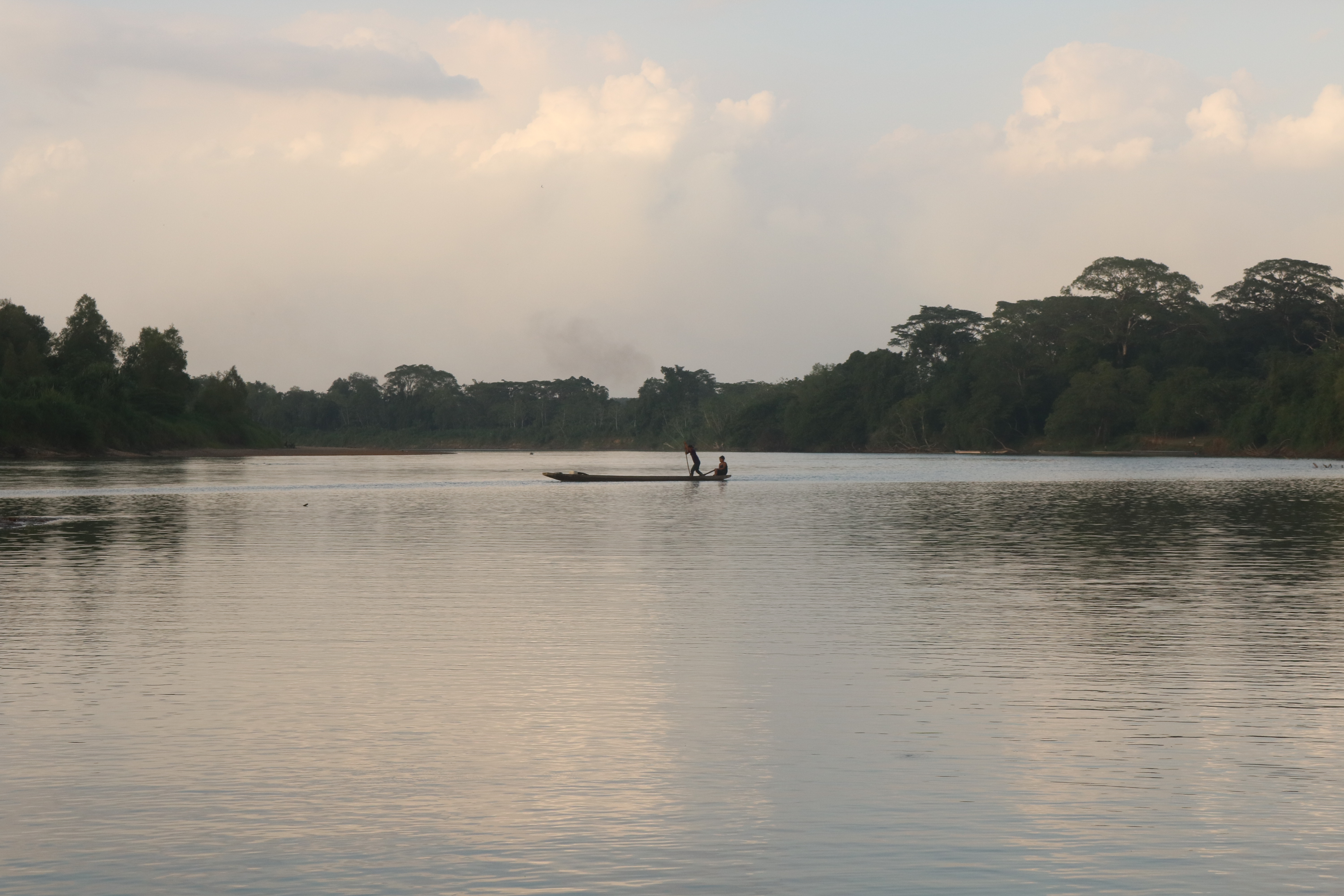
- Patuca River

Location
- Country: Honduras

Physical characteristics
- Mouth
  - coordinates: 15°47′N 84°15′W
- Length: 500 kilometres (310 mi)
- Basin size: 23,900 square kilometres (9,200 mi^{2})

The Patuca is a river in northeastern Honduras, formed southeast of Juticalpa by the merger of the Guayape and Guayambre rivers. It is the second largest river in Central America and the longest river of Honduras, measuring almost 500 kilometres (310 mi) long and draining 23,900 square kilometres (9,200 mi^{2}).

== Course ==
The river originates in the central mountains at the confluence of the Guayape and Guayambre rivers. It flows northeasterly, meandering and twisting along its way to the lowlands of the Mosquito Coast before joining the Caribbean Sea at Patuca Point.

The Patuca is infamous within Honduras for a section of rapids known as "El Portal del Infierno" or "The Gates of Hell" which are known to have killed many reckless river-goers.

At floodstage the Patuca can reach several miles in width. Its main tributary, the Guayape is known to exceed 3 kilometres (2 mi) in width nearly every year in areas that can be waded waist-deep in the dry season.

The Patuca is also well known for its lawless nether regions where small heavily armed groups of men dredge vast placer gold deposits in the areas up-river from the Mosquitia jungle.

== Dam projects ==
The Patuca was proposed to be dammed to provide hydroelectric power. Two previous efforts were abandoned, the first in the late 1990s when Hurricane Mitch caused widespread damages and the second in 2007 when financial crisis forced Taiwan Power to withdraw. In 2011, The Honduran government approved the Chinese firm Sinohydro to build the first of the three dams.

The Patuca River was featured in the Douglas Preston book The Codex.
