= La Ciudad Blanca =

Legendary settlement in eastern Honduras

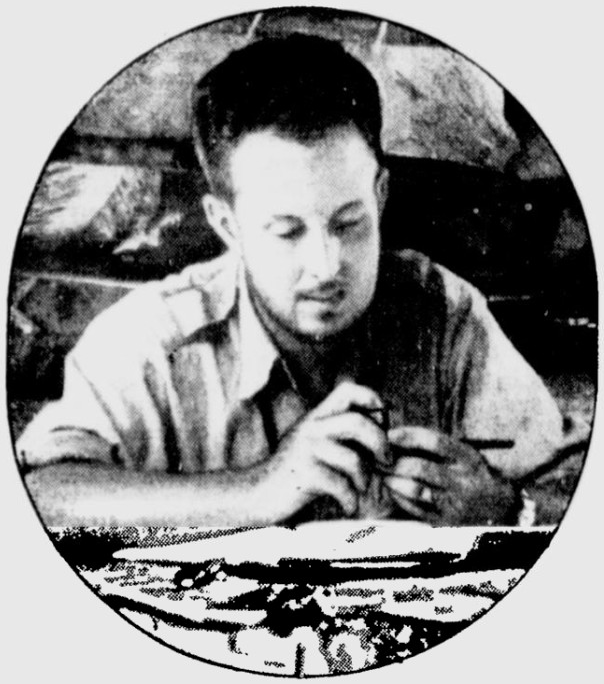
The American explorer Theodore Morde claimed to discover the settlement

La Ciudad Blanca (pronounced [la sjuˈðað ˈblaŋka], Spanish for "The White City") is a legendary settlement said to be located in the Gracias a Dios Department in eastern Honduras. It is also known by the Pech name Kahã Kamasa ("White Town"). This extensive area of rainforest, which includes the Río Plátano Biosphere Reserve, has long been the subject of multidisciplinary research. Archaeologists refer to it as being a part of the Isthmo-Colombian Area of the Americas, one in which the predominant indigenous languages have included those in the Chibchan and Misumalpan families. Due to the many variants of the story in the region, most professional archaeologists doubt that it refers to any one actual settlement, much less one representing a city of the Pre-Columbian era. They point out that there are multiple large archaeological sites in the region and that references to the legendary White City cannot be proven to refer to any single place.

Spanish conquistador Hernán Cortés reported hearing "trustworthy" information on a region with "towns and villages" of extreme wealth in Honduras, but never located them. In 1927, aviator Charles Lindbergh reported seeing a "white city" while flying over eastern Honduras. The first known mention by an academic of the ruins under the name Ciudad Blanca (White City) was by Eduard Conzemius, an ethnographer from Luxembourg, in 1927. In his report on the Pech people of Honduras to the Society of Americanists, he said the ruins had been found about twenty-five years earlier by someone looking for rubber who got lost in the area between the Paulaya River and the Plátano River. He said it was called the White City because its buildings and a wall around it were white stone. (See Timeline below for a list of the many attempts to identify the White City.)

Interest in Ciudad Blanca grew in the 1990s as numerous explorers searched for it and news of archeological work in the area was chronicled in popular media. In 2009, author Christopher Stewart attempted to retrace the steps of Theodore Morde in 1940 with the help of archaeologist Christopher Begley. His book about the search, Jungleland, was published in 2013. In May 2012, press releases issued by a team led by documentary film maker Steve Elkins and by the Honduran government about remote sensing exploration using LiDAR renewed interest in the legend. The lidar mapping revealed not one but two large settlements, one of which was the size of the core of Copán. Discovery of Ciudad Blanca was asserted by the media yet again after a 2015 expedition explored one of the settlements discovered in the 2012 lidar survey, which expedition archaeologists determined was in fact a Pre-Columbian city. This work has also been met with both acclaim and criticism.

Only 200 archeological sites have been discovered and documented in all of Mosquitia during the twentieth century, ranging from large complex settlements to artifact scatters and petroglyphs. The ancient inhabitants of Mosquitia are one of the least-known cultures in Central America, with the most extensive building period being 800-1250 AD. However, only a few have been systematically mapped and scientifically investigated so far and large parts of the region remain scientifically undocumented. The legend of Ciudad Blanca, a popular element of folklore in Honduras, has been the subject of multiple films, TV programs, books, articles, and in 2010 the Honduran government inaugurated an eco-tourism route to take advantage of its popularity called Ruta "Kao Kamasa" (Route plus the Pech name for the White City) between Santa Maria de Real (Escamilpa in the conquest period), Olancho and going through the Pech villages and the town of Dulce Nombre de Culmí either to the southern entrance of the Rio Platano Biosphere or to the Sierra de Agalta National Park or the proposed Malacate Mountain Wildlife Preserve in the municipio or county of Dulce Nombre de Culmí, Olancho Department.

== Background ==
Mosquitia is a historical and geo-cultural region along the western shore of the Caribbean Sea in Central America, traditionally described as extending from Cape Camarón to the River Chagres. The White City is said to be located in the Gracias a Dios department, reportedly in or near the Río Plátano Biosphere Reserve, a protected World Heritage Site stretching across the Gracias a Dios, Colon and Olancho Departments of Honduras in what archaeologists refer to as the Isthmo-Colombian Area. The ecology of this region is primarily a rainforest habitat, although parts are savannah and swamp. Mosquitia is occupied by several different indigenous peoples including the Pech, Miskito, Miskito Sambu, and Tawakha, Creoles, as well as mestizo populations and those of European and East or South Asian ancestry. These groups all speak their own languages, but Colonial-era reports also mention "Mexicano" (presumably Nahuatl) and variants of Lencan languages (Colo, Ulúa, Lenca) in the Taguzgalpa area east of Trujillo.

The Pech (at one time referred to as Paya) "trace their ancestry to Chilmeca in the Plátano River headwaters, near the legendary and lost 'Ciudad Blanca'." In the past another group of indigenous peoples known to the Miskitos as the Rah, who were very warlike and ate people, also lived in the area. The Rio Platano Biosphere declared in the 1980s is a larger area that includes all the protected area decreed in 1961 by the Honduran Congress at the suggestion of the Maker of Honduras's 1954 General Map Dr. Jesús Aguilar Paz as the Ciudad Blanca Protected Area. The Honduran-Nicaraguan border dispute wasn't decided until 1960 in the World Court at The Hague. Aguilar Paz had included on his map a place called "Ciudad Blanca" with a question mark. The Pech name for the ruin is Kao Kamasa (White House in English, Casa Blanca in Spanish).

Popular accounts of the Ciudad Blanca claim it was a city of great wealth, associated with the town or Province of Taguzgalpa east of Trujillo, that the Spanish on repeated occasions tried to conquer but could not. Indigenous people such as the Pech, Tawahkas, and Miskitos talk about a city that cannot be entered, or if regular people enter they can not take anything out of it, and if they tell where it is, they will be punished. In some versions, it is the hiding place of deities who retreated from the Spanish invaders. Some accounts of Ciudad Blanca include allusions to the legend of El Dorado, an imaginary location in South America. In Honduras, the Colonial era Spanish had a gold mine located between the Paulaya and Sico Rivers, an area named El Dorado in Colonial times.

== History ==
The precise origin of the Ciudad Blanca legend is unclear. Spanish Conquistador Hernán Cortés is often cited as the earliest reference to the story, but he actually never mentioned a "white city" and his geographical references are vague. Begley suggests that elements of the legend probably originated with preexisting Pech and Tawahka stories and that those were conflated with Spanish fables from the time of the Spanish Conquest.

=== Spanish conquest ===
Around 1520, Cortés received what he considered to be "trustworthy reports of very extensive and rich provinces, and of powerful chiefs ruling over them". For example, Cortés made inquiries about a place called Hueitlapatlán (literally Old Land of Red Earth in Nahua), also known as Xucutaco (written Axucutaco in one copy of Cortés' letters) for six years. In 1526, he wrote to Spanish Emperor Charles V detailing what he had learned. "So wonderful are the reports about this particular province," he wrote, "that even allowing largely for exaggeration, it will exceed Mexico in riches, and equal it in the size of its towns and villages, the density of its population, and the culture of its inhabitants." According to Cortés, this place was located "between fifty and sixty leagues" (around 130–155 miles/210–250 km) from Trujillo. Although it is often assumed that Cortés and other conquistadors searched for it, there is no record of such attempts and it was never located. The Spanish of Trujillo strongly affected the Peoples of the Ciudad Blanca area through epidemics against which they had no defenses such as bubonic plague (peste) and smallpox (viruelas), through capturing 150,000 people, which they sent from Trujillo to be slaves in the Caribbean Islands of Santo Domingo and Cuba where by 1545 all but 11 had died and later sent the last of their 300 encomienda to guard the Fort Santo Tomas Guatemala in 1645, and when they used forced labor for a short time in the 1530s to mine for gold in the Rio Paulaya and Rio Platano and at the site of Xeo (now Feo), Colón, before the Rah and Miskito and European pirates forced them to withdraw to Trujillo and from 1645 to 1797 all the way to Sonaguera, Colón.

=== Nineteenth-century speculation ===
The publication by Lord Kingsborough of his nine-volume Antiquities of Mexico beginning in 1830 aroused significant interest in cultures of the Pre-Columbian era in Mexico and Central America, contributing to a legacy of romantic speculation about "lost cities" in Latin America that persists to this day. In 1839, just a year after Honduras became an independent and sovereign state, attorney, explorer, and travel writer John Lloyd Stephens visited the remains of Copán, a Maya site in Honduras, as well as dozens of ruins in Central America and Mexico. When he described his discoveries in the best-selling, two-volume Incidents of Travel in Central America, Chiapas, and Yucatán, with illustrations by his partner Frederick Catherwood, the public's imagination was ignited. However, early scholars tended to ignore the cultures of the challenging Mosquitia region and little exploration was undertaken. Even so, rumors of lost cities persisted.

In the United States, speculation about Lost Tribes and other connections between the Bible and the Americas, especially as recounted in the Book of Mormon, and the popularity of the Lost World genre of fantasy literature ignited the public imagination. Many people presumed under the Manifest Destiny that the ruins of Mexico and Central America would eventually become the property of the United States.

The Miskito King and General Thomas Lawrie signed a peace, friendship and mutual assistance treaty with Honduras in 1845, ending more than three centuries of war between the Kingdom of the Miskito peoples, which included the Ciudad Blanca area, and the Hondurans. The following year the sister of the Miskito King, Ana Frederica as regent, signed a peace treaty with the Nicaraguan government. In 1860 the Honduran government and Great Britain signed a treaty turning the Honduran Mosquitia over to the Honduran government "wherever the border might be with Nicaragua" and Great Britain also signed a similar treaty with the Nicaraguans. However, Honduran control remained minimal in the area, and the actual decision that the Ciudad Blanca area actually even belonged to the Honduran government was not made until 1960, after a brief border war in 1958-1959 known as "Guerra de Mocoron".

=== Early-twentieth-century exploration and speculation ===
During World War I, archaeologist Sylvanus Morley collected intelligence for the Office of Naval Intelligence, while also undertaking an archaeological survey of the coastal rivers of Mosquitia.

In 1924, archaeologist Herbert Spinden made an expedition to visit sites on the Río Patuca and the Río Plátano in eastern Honduras, reporting on his experiences first in an article in The New York Times and in a paper presented that same year at the 21st International Congress of Americanists in Gothenburg, Sweden. In his paper, Spinden identified a "Chorotegan" culture whose material remains were found in a region that extended from central Honduras to eastern and northwestern Costa Rica. He reported, photographed, and described large, elaborately stone metates and cylindrical vessels that had been found as surface finds in Mosquitia and which he collected for the Peabody Museum of Archaeology and Ethnology at Harvard University. Spinden drew comparisons between this material and objects collected by Minor Cooper Keith in Costa Rica in the late 1800s as well as those reported in 1901 and 1907 publications by Carl Vilhelm Hartman from Mercedes and other sites in Costa Rica.

While some believe earliest mention of the "White City" appears to have been made by pilot Charles Lindbergh, who is said to have reported ruins he saw while flying over Honduras in 1927. However, author Jason Colavito notes, "So far as I know, Lindbergh's 1927 claim is where many believe the name Ciudad Blanca comes from, but even this isn't certain since this legend saw print only in the 1950s, some three decades after the fact." Lindbergh is said to have described it as "an amazing ancient metropolis." However, according to Colavito, "The oft-quoted phrase 'an amazing ancient metropolis,' attributed in the recent book Jungleland to Lindbergh, is actually another author's paraphrase of a third author's 1958 claim." The first mention by an academic of the ruins under the name Ciudad Blanca (White City) was by an ethnographer from Luxemburg Eduard Conzemius in 1927 in his report on the Paya of Honduras to the Society of Americanistes where he said the important ruins had been found about 25 years earlier between the Paulaya River and the Plantain River by someone looking for rubber and lost in the area. It was called the White City because its buildings and a wall around it were of white stone.

Adventurer F. A. Mitchell-Hedges was commissioned by George Gustav Heye to explore the Mosquitia. In 1930, Mitchell-Hedges returned from the jungle with information that a lost city with a giant monkey-god statue buried underground was located deep in the mountains of Mosquitia, and that the natives called the city the "Lost city of the Monkey-God". Mitchell-Hedges lost an eye during this expedition, and suffered from diarrhea, malaria, and other conditions.

In 1933, archaeologist William Duncan Strong explored Honduras for the Smithsonian Institution, concentrating on the Bay Islands and northeastern part of the mainland. In his 1935 report on the expedition, Strong reports that "the famed 'White City' of the Paya" is said to reside in the upper Plátano region, according to "local tradition". According to Strong, Spinden, who visited the area in 1924, "does not describe any ruins but mentions the occurrence of stone bowls with animal and bird heads, and great metates and slabs similar to those at Las Mercedes in Costa Rica."

Also in 1933, Honduran president Tiburcio Carías sponsored an expedition to the region. The government was planning to open Mosquitia to colonization and wanted to perform an ethnological study of the indigenous peoples before their way of life was disturbed. They contracted with Museum of the American Indian founder George Gustav Heye to perform the study. Explorer R. Stuart Murray was hired to lead the expedition. He brought back a few artifacts, and a rumor of "a great ruin, overrun by dense jungle." "There's supposedly a lost city... which the Indians call the City of the Monkey God", he reported. "They are afraid to go near it for they believe that any one who approaches it will, within the month, be killed by the bite of a poisonous snake." A return trip to complete the study and search for the city was held in 1934, but did not find it.

In 1941, archaeologist Doris Zemurray Stone published The Archaeology of The North Coast of Honduras (1941), a major synthesis of the archaeology of Honduran Mosquitia that contained no reference to Ciudad Blanca

==== Theodore Morde and the "Lost City of Ancient America's Monkey God" ====
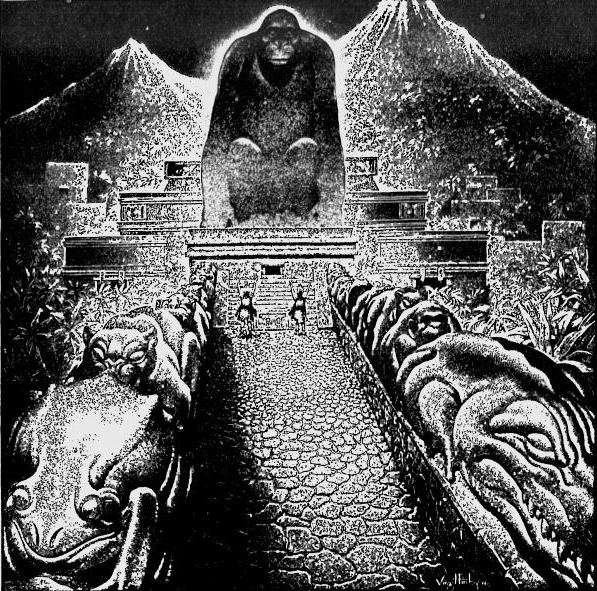
An illustration by Virgil Finlay for The American Weekly representing the Temple in Morde's "Lost City of the Monkey God."

In 1940, George Gustav Heye hired American adventurer and future spy Theodore Morde to perform a third expedition. The goal of the expedition was to further study the local indigenous people, explore archaeological sites, chart the upper reaches of the Wampú River, and search for a rumored "lost city."

After four months, Morde and his colleague Laurence C. Brown reported having made a great find, which included ancient razor blades. "'City of the Monkey God' is believed located: Expedition reports success in Honduras expedition" read the headline of the New York Times. According to the letter Morde sent home, the "city" was located in "an almost inaccessible area between the Paulaya and Plátano Rivers." Morde and Brown, following Spinden's earlier terminology, described their find as the capital of an agricultural civilization of the Chorotega people.

When he returned to the states, Morde described traveling miles through swamps, up rivers, and over mountains before coming across ruins that he interpreted as the remains of a walled city. In an article for The American Weekly, a Sunday magazine tabloid edited by fantasy fiction author A. Merritt, he claimed to have evidence of large, ruined buildings. He said that his Paya guides told him that there once was a temple with a large staircase leading to a statue of a "Monkey God." Morde speculated that the deity was an American parallel to the Hindu deity Hanuman, who he says "was the equivalent of America's own Paul Bunyan in his amazing feats of strength and daring." According to Morde, he was told that the temple had a "long, staired approach" lined with stone effigies of monkeys. "The heart of the Temple was a high stone dais on which was the statue of the Monkey God himself. Before it was a place of sacrifice." The steps to the dais were said to have been flanked by immense balustrades. "At the beginning of one was the colossal image of a frog; at the beginning of the other a crocodile.". He also said the guides told him the city had been inhabited by the Chorotegas "a thousand or more years ago". Morde thought the ruins which he found with white stone walls, large bases, and stairways were built by the Chorotegas (people from Cholula in Mangue, who in Honduras also sometimes appears as Cholulatecas—people from Cholula in Nahuat and those in Honduras seemed to have spoken Nahua).

Morde also related a story about a monkey who had stolen three women with whom it bred, resulting in half-monkey half-human children. He claimed, "The native name for monkey is Urus, which translates literally into 'sons of the hairy men.' Their fathers, or fore-fathers, are the Ulaks, half-man and half-spirit, who lived on the ground, walked upright and had the appearance of great hairy ape-men." According to journalist Wendy Griffin, Nahuat speakers repeated a similar story to anthropologist James Taggart many years later. In Morde's version, the hybrid children were hunted for revenge, while in the Nahuat version the child grew up to be Nahuehue, a Thunderbolt god.

Morde and Brown brought back thousands of artifacts, most of which became part of the collection of the Heye Foundation Museum of the American Indian in New York City. These included stone blades, a flute, stone statuary, and stone utensils. Morde and Brown also reported having found evidence of gold, silver, platinum, and oil. The artifacts are now part of the National Museum of the American Indian in Washington, D.C.

Morde vowed to return to Honduras in January 1941 to undertake further study and excavate the "city," but did not. He died in 1954 from an apparent suicide, never having secured funds to return to the area. He had not revealed the precise location of his supposed discovery, causing later conspiracy theorists to assert that his death was the result of sinister forces. Later authors, including journalists Christopher Stewart and Douglas Preston, have associated Morde's "City of the Monkey God" with Ciudad Blanca.

Preston uncovered Morde's journals and revealed in his book, The Lost City of the Monkey God, that Morde's claim of finding the Lost City was entirely fabricated, and that his and Brown's search for the legendary city was actually a cover for a secret hunt for placer gold—which Morde and Brown discovered and mined in quantity along a tributary of the Rio Blanco, far from where Morde claimed to have found the ruins. Morde's journals suggest he hastily acquired the artifacts near the coast, after the expedition emerged from the jungle.

=== Late-twentieth-century exploration and speculation ===
German geographer Karl Helbig in 1953 did an extensive investigation of archaeological sites in the old Paya region, including Valley of Agalta, and the Rio Platano area identifying sites, and drawing examples of the archaeology with three pages of discussion specifically about "die Weisse stadt" (Ciudad Blanca or White City in German) .

In 1960, the Honduran government portioned off a 2,000 square mile piece of Mosquitia and called it the Ciudad Blanca Archaeological Reserve. In 1980, UNESCO named a larger area encompassing the earlier Reserve the Río Plátano Biosphere Reserve. In 1982, it was designated a World Heritage Site. The Biosphere program was renamed as the Man in the Biosphere, to include the understanding that this is not a park without people, but rather the area has thousands of native people, some of whom tell the stories that the big rocks with petroglyphs on the Rio Platano such as Walpa Ulban Silp (Pequeña Piedra tallada) y walpan Ulban Tara (Grande Piedra tallada) mark the umbilical cord of their people, that that is where they came out of the earth to this earth. According to Dr. Chris Begley, there have been people in what is now the Rio Plátano Biosphere and the Ciudad Blanca area for at least 3,000 years

A 1976 expedition by David Zink and archaeologist Edwin M. Shook was filmed by a television crew. The crew traveled by airplane and helicopter to Mosquitia, where they located ancient mounds over which a local had built his dwelling. They also unearthed several stone monoliths.

Since the 1980s, archeologists including Begley, George Hasemann and Gloria Lara Pinto have explored the area and have documented hundreds of sites, including Crucitas del Río Aner, the largest recorded until the 2012 lidar expedition documented two larger sites, one of which still remains unexplored. News of their finds, combined with the ease of spreading information on the Internet, has led to unprecedented interest since the turn of the century.

The British sent two expeditions Operation Drake and Operation Raleigh to look for the lost White City in the Plátano River and Rio Tinto and down the Paulaya River areas the early 1980s. They found both archaeological sites that were fairly simple such as would be expected of hunting and fishing people in the rainforest like the Pech and the Tawahkas, but they also reported large complex sites which are usually identified with stratified societies like Mesoamerican societies, instead of the more equalitarian leadership styles of the Pech and Tawahkas.

In the 1990s, explorer Ted Maschal (a.k.a. Ted Danger) undertook various expeditions in search of Ciudad Blanca that were sponsored by an organization he founded called the Society for the Exploration and Preservation of Honduras (SEPH). His principal interest was in tracing evidence for a historical basis of the myth of Quetzalcoatl and for a Nahuatl presence in the region. It was his conclusion that architectural remains in the region had been built by people of the Pipil culture who spoke Nahua. Academics who have supported the probable builders of the large ruins of the Ciudad Blanca area within and next to the Rio Plátano Biosphere include Dr. William Fowler, the leading ethnohistorian of Nahua speaking Pipiles and Nicaraos in the Central American area, and Wendy Griffin, the ethnohistorian working with Ted Maschal and author of several books on the Indigenous peoples of northeast Honduras, particularly the Pech. Dr. Chris Begley did not agree with this identification and felt that the peoples native to the Mosquitia adopted traits like ball courts, stone-sided temple mounds with stairs reaching 12 meters high, walled cities, white stone paved roads down to the rivers and between parts of the sites, the extensive use of stone corn grinding stones, terraced agriculture, the use of fine orange pottery, the adoption of incised punctates and dots designs (such as were found on Fine Orange and coarser ceramics in Cholula in the Classic Period), and the use of caves for ceremonial purposes such as are found at the archaeological site of Las Crucitas on the Aner river near the Guampu River from contact with Mesoamerican neighbors and traders. According to the Honduran government SEDINAFROH website about Nahuas, they mention that caves used for ceremonial uses were an important identifying part of that culture and El Heraldo reporters noted that the use of caves, the stone grinding stones, and the stone statues in the Rio Platano/Ciudad blanca area were similar to what was found in Southern Honduras in Choluteca (name from Cholulateca, people from Cholula in Nahua).

Francis Yakam-Simen, Edmond Nezry, and James Ewing used the remote sensing method of synthetic aperture radar (SAR) images to "identify and locate the lost city" in thick vegetation. They also used "radargrammetric techniques" to produce a digital elevation model (DEM) of the study area and to combine various data sources "to allow visual interpretation of the remnants of Ciudad Blanca by visual photo interpretation". This work sought to "guide a group expedition in the future", The archaeology shown includes Quetzalcoatl heads, corn grinding stones (manos and metates), and petroglyphs of a king with a crown and a monkey head.

=== Early-twenty-first-century exploration and speculation ===
A documentary featuring Begley and actor Ewan McGregor aired on American television in 2001.

==== Jungleland expedition ====
In 2009, journalist Christopher S. Stewart, accompanied by archaeologist Christopher Begley undertook an expedition as the basis for a book, published as Jungleland (2012), in which he sought to retrace the explorations by Morde. Using Morde's journals as a guide, Stewart and Begley visited a number of archaeological sites in the region. However, they could not be sure they followed Morde's path exactly, and thus were unsure if what they found was what Morde claimed to have seen.

==== Under the LiDAR (UTL) project ====
During the 1990s, documentary film maker Steve Elkins became fascinated by the legend and made multiple trips into the Honduran rain forests in search of a "lost city", but did not find it. In 2009, he learned that a team led by archaeologists Arlen and Diane Chase of the University of Central Florida used LiDAR to map a 200 square kilometres (20,000 ha) area covering most of the Vaca Plateau in Belize that includes the ruins of Caracol, a Maya site located in a dense rainforest. LiDAR mapping revealed that approximately 90% of the site's remains had not been identified by conventional ground survey and revealed large structures, roads, reservoirs, and even looted tombs. The mapping was funded by NASA and the data was collected by the National Science Foundation (NSF) National Center for Airborne Laser Mapping (NCALM), a research center for airborne scientific LiDAR mapping.

Elkins teamed with film maker Bill Benenson to found UTL ("Under the LiDAR") Productions LLC to fund the mapping, later ground searches, and film production focused on discovering settlements in the region where Ciudad Blanca is supposedly located in eastern Honduras. Over seven days in 2012, they flew a Cessna 337 Skymaster carrying LiDAR equipment over four target areas. The LiDAR data, merged with GPS data, was originally interpreted by Carter, who said: "I don't think it took me more than five minutes to see something that looked like a pyramid." He believed that the images showed some pillars, many geometric mounds, linked plazas, and extensive areas of human-altered terrain.

When he learned of the find, Áfrico Madrid, the Minister of Interior, informed Honduran President Porfirio Lobo Sosa that he believed Ciudad Blanca had been located. According to Preston, both of them "credited the hand of God", with Madrid remarking: "There are no coincidences...I think that God has extraordinary plans for our country, and Ciudad Blanca could be one of them." On May 15, 2012, Elkins and Juan Carlos Fernandez Díaz, the Honduran LiDAR operator, presented their results live on Honduran television. They qualified their announcement by describing their find as "what appears to be evidence of archaeological ruins in an area long rumored to contain the lost city of Ciudad Blanca", but reports in mainstream media announced the city had been found.

As with the previous finds, some archaeologists immediately criticized the announcement. Rosemary Joyce, a Mesoamerican specialist and expert on Honduran archaeology from UC Berkeley, called it "big hype" and "bad archaeology". She said: "This is at least the fifth time someone's announced that they've found the White City... there is no White City. The White City is a myth. I'm quite biased against this group of people because they are adventurers and not archeologists. They're after spectacle." However, she confirmed that the images did show what appeared to be archaeological features and remarked there were what seemed to be: "...three major clusters of larger structures, a plaza, a public space par excellence, and a possible ball court, and many house mounds." Preston noted: "She guessed that the site dated from the late- or post-classic period, between 500 and 1000 AD."

In May 2013, Elkins' archaeological team announced additional details based on further analysis of the LiDAR data, and news media once again promoted the legend of a "lost city".

In February 2015, a joint Honduran-American expedition organized by UTL and the Honduran government explored one of two large sites revealed in the 2012 lidar survey. Ten PhD scientists took part, including Honduran and American archaeologists, anthropologists, engineers, along with filmmakers, a writer, support personnel and Honduran Special Forces soldiers. The team surveyed and mapped extensive plazas, earthworks, an earthen pyramid, irrigation canals and a possible reservoir. They also discovered an untouched cache of elaborately carved stone offerings at the base of the central pyramid, placed there when the city was abandoned 500 years ago.

In August 2016, the UTL team published an account of their findings in a peer-reviewed, online journal. A popular account of the expedition appears in a 2017 book by Douglas Preston.

== Archaeological interpretations ==
Archaeological interpretations of Ciudad Blanca are practically nonexistent. Ciudad Blanca is not mentioned in academic syntheses of Honduran archaeology or Begley's 1999 dissertation on the archaeology of the region. Stories about spotting la Ciudad Blanca from a distance are common in Honduras today. Archaeologist Gordon Willey suggested that people were misinterpreting white limestone cliffs as architecture. However, the Pech, the Miskitos, and Ladinos in the Mosquitia also report seeing the Ciudad Blanca and even spending the night there when out hunting and Ladinos in particular have guided film makers and archaeologists to archaeological sites in the region.

In 1994, George Hasemann, former head of the Archaeology Section of the Instituto Hondureño de Antropología e Historia (IHAH), said the 200 or so known archeological sites in Mosquitia may have been part of a single political system dominated by a "huge primate center," meaning a single settlement many orders of magnitude larger than others, that has not yet been identified. Hasemann, referring to archaeological remains of settlements as well as the tales told about them, told a journalist that there might be multiple "ciudades blancas" in Mosquitia.

There have been multiple claims of the discovery of Ciudad Blanca. "Every ten years or so, somebody finds it," says Begley, who documented this history of claims in a 2016 article for the book Lost City, Found Pyramid. Most professional archaeologists remain skeptical that the various legends surrounding Ciudad Blanca refer to a specific site. According to Begley, the various version of the legend do not provide "any characteristics, traits, or identifying attributes" making it impossible to say that any given archaeological site is THE Ciudad Blanca. Jason Colavito, an author and blogger about pseudoarchaeology, identifies promotion of the "White City" myth as part of a neoliberal strategy to bring tourism to Honduras.

=== UTL interpretations of LiDAR data ===
In mid-June 2012, archaeologist Christopher Fisher of Colorado State University, a Mesoamerican specialist with expertise in Western Mexico, joined the UTL project. Fisher, who had previously used LiDAR at the Purépecha archaeological site of Angamuco in Michoacán, Mexico, spent six months analyzing Elkins's data. In December, he presented his findings to the team. "There is a big city [at T3]," he said. "It's comparable in geographic area to the core of Copán" (about two square miles). He also identified a large city at T1, numerous small sites, and possible a small city at T2. According to Fisher, the sites at T1 and T3 are as large or larger than the biggest previous finds in Mosquitia. "Each of these areas was once a completely modified human environment," he said. Fisher said each of the sites had clear division of space, social stratification, and had roads leading to farms and outskirt settlements but, unlike Copán and Caracol, which were built around a central core, the Mosquitia settlements were more dispersed.

Fisher and geographer Stephen Leisz, both of Colorado State University, presented their findings at the annual conference of the American Geophysical Union in May 2013. When asked if Ciudad Blanca had been found, Fisher laughed and said "I don't think there is a single Ciudad Blanca. I think there are many." The legend may hold cultural meaning, he said, but for archeologists it is mostly a distraction.

Additional research in the area has been reported by Douglas Preston in a March 2, 2015 article for National Geographic. Preston notes that, "Archaeologists surveyed and mapped extensive plazas, earthworks, mounds, and an earthen pyramid..." and "also discovered a remarkable cache of stone sculptures" including metates or stone seats and "finely carved vessels decorated with snakes, zoomorphic figures, and vultures".

The project conducted excavations in 2016 and 2017, uncovering hundreds of stone offerings left at the base of the central earthen pyramid, the first such intact cache that had ever been excavated in Honduras. The work was conducted by a joint Honduran American archaeological team under the direction of Virgilio Paredes, Director of the Instituto Hondureño de Antropología e Historia. However, the archaeological discoveries generated criticism from several Honduran archaeologists, who asserted that Ciudad Blanca was and remains a myth and not a "discovery". Honduran archaeologist Ricardo Agurcia remarked, "What I have been able to see has very little scientific merit. What I find strange as well is that news of this type comes out first published outside Honduras".

A few archaeologists in the U.S. have also been critical of the project, with Rosemary Joyce stating: "Reading these reports, it seems like 1915 has come again and everything actual archaeologists have spent the last century learning has been swept away. For modern archaeologists who aren't trying to aggrandize themselves or live a fantasy about tomb raiders, the imagery of 'discovery' and 'lost civilizations' make this story tragic: instead of knowledge, this story is a message of ignorance." In an interview with The Guardian, project archaeologist Chris Fisher claimed, "We never said it's Ciudad Blanca or the city of the lost monkey god" and he dismissed the charges as "ridiculous" and coming from archaeologists who had not participated in the expedition, had no idea where the site was, and had no knowledge of the archaeological findings as they had not yet been published. The Honduran government also defended the joint Honduran-American research project against its critics. "They criticized, because they were not involved," said Virgilio Paredes, Director of the Honduran Institute of Anthropology and History. "Come on! They should be saying, 'How can we get involved and help?' This is a project for my country, Honduras—for my children's children."

=== Increased understanding of the region ===
Archaeologists have come to realize that societies of what is now referred to as the Isthmo-Colombian Area likely cleared huge areas of land and practiced agriculture. Fisher believes the assumed "inhospitable jungle" was probably more like a "tended garden" of numerous crops mingled together around dense housing settlements. Fisher's view is consistent with other recent interpretations of indigenous agriculture in southern Central America.

Indigenous societies of the region built monumental architecture, plazas, and even parallel-sided ballcourts for playing something similar to the Mesoamerican ballgame. These societies probably built their houses and large superstructures from perishable materials such as wattle and daub and thatching with foundations of rounded river cobbles, rather than the cut stone and rubble used in large buildings of the Maya civilization. Similar construction techniques as used in the Ciudad Blanca area were also reported by the Spanish for the Nahua speaking Nicarao communities in Nicaragua. To date, the most extensive archaeological survey of the Department of Gracias a Dios was conducted by Begley, who documented dozens of sites with significant architectural remains. According to Begley, the region was subject to cultural influence from both the Maya and Nahua, but the principal pre-Columbian population appears to have been the ancestors of the Pech, a Chibchan-speaking people.

== Cultural impact ==
The legend of Ciudad Blanca is widely known in Honduras. In June 2012, Honduran daily newspaper El Heraldo featured a multi-part series on the legend of Ciudad Blanca and archaeological remains in the Río Plátano Biosphere Reserve.

To the Pech people of Honduras, "the thing that's 'lost' in this lost city isn't the city itself", explains Begley. "It represents a kind of golden age, their lost autonomy, or hope, or opportunity." In a Pech story called the "Patatahua", collected by anthropologist Lazaro Flores, the people of Ciudad Blanca were "allied with the spirits of the great storms" such as the Thundergods.

=== El Xendra ===
In 2012, Honduran filmmaker Juan Luís Franconi directed El Xendra, a feature-length science fiction motion picture filmed in Honduras. In the movie, four scientists experience a series of paranormal events that lead them to a place called Ciudad Blanca. The cast included Juan Pablo Olyslager (Carlos), Boris Barraza (Doc), Rocío Carranza (Marcela), and Fabian Sales (Diego). The marketing of the film referenced the 2012 phenomenon with a plot set in January 2013, after the supposed December 21, 2012 "Maya apocalypse."

=== Jungleland ===
In his 2013 nonfiction book Jungleland, journalist Christopher S. Stewart recounts his exploration of the rainforest habitat of Gracias a Dios in search of Ciudad Blanca. Archaeologist Christopher Begley helped lead the trip, which took Stewart to a previously documented archaeological site with monumental architecture. The story climaxes when Stewart and Begley arrive at the large ruins, which may or may not have been what Morde found. It ends on a philosophical note. The site cannot possibly be la Ciudad Blanca, Begley explains, "because the White City must always be lost" by definition.

=== Legend of the Monkey God ===
On October 4, 2015, the National Geographic Channel premiered Legend of the Monkey God, a documentary about Steve Elkins' quest to find the White City. It features interviews with Elkins and author Douglas Preston, who accompanied the 2015 expedition to Honduras, as well as with Stewart.

=== The Lost City of the Monkey God (book) ===
On January 3, 2017, the book The Lost City of the Monkey God: A True Story by author Douglas Preston, was published. It chronicles the history of the search for Ciudad Blanca or the Lost City of the Monkey God and provides a history of Steve Elkins' search for Ciudad Blanca and a description of the Under the LiDAR (UTL) expedition and its results.

=== Chasing the Lost City ===
After the release of Douglas Preston's book The Lost City of the Monkey God: A True Story, filmmaker Tom Weinberg published a well-illustrated book called Chasing the Lost City: Chronicles of Discovery in Honduras in which he provided a personal narrative of his experiences with cinematographer Steve Elkins and director/producer Bill Benenson in search of the White City. It was conceived of as an illustrated companion volume to Preston's book, providing supplementary documentation of the UTL Productions expeditions in 2012 and 2015. Much of the content was written in the form of "chronicles" recorded during the expeditions. This book also provides additional primary documentation of the expedition.

=== The Lost City of the Monkey God (film) ===
The documentary film Lost City of the Monkey God, produced and directed by Bill Benenson and featuring Steve Elkins and Douglas Preston along with critics of the project such as archaeologist Rosemary Joyce, premiered on the Science Channel, which is owned by Discovery, Inc., on October 31, 2021.

== Timeline ==
- 1526 – Hernán Cortés writes about Hueitapalan, a province that "will exceed Mexico in riches"
- 1544 – Bishop Cristóbal de Pedraza describes a city whose inhabitants "eat off plates of gold", according to local informants
- 1924 – Archaeologist Herbert Spinden of the Peabody Museum of Archaeology and Ethnology at Harvard University explores archaeological sites on the Plátano River.
- 1927 – Ethnographer Eduard Conzemius makes reference to a "white city" in a report on the Pech people of Honduras to the International Congress of Americanists
- 1933 – Archaeologist William Duncan Strong explores la Mosquitia for The Smithsonian
- 1934 – Explorer R. Stuart Murray of The Explorers Club undertakes expedition to the Wampu and Patuca Rivers, returning with a collection of artifacts from eastern Honduras.
- 1940 – Explorer Theodore Morde claims to discover "The Lost City of the Monkey God"
- 1952 – Expedition by explorer Tibor Sekelj funded by the Honduran Ministry of Culture.
- 1960 - Mining engineer Sam Glassmire, with ghostwriter Hank Chapman, writes about discoveries on the Wampú River in an article titled "I Found a Lost City" for Empire.
- 1976 – David Zink and archaeologist Edwin M. Shook film an expedition into the rainforests of Mosquitia. Jim Woodman, Bill Spohrer, and Fausto Padillo searched for the Ciudad Blanca on the Wampú River, as reported in Sports Illustrated
- 1985 – Operation Raleigh
- 1990 – Geographer Peter Herlihy, indigenous cartography in the Río Plátano Biosphere Reserve
- 1993 – Explorers Jim Ewing and Ted Maschal (a.k.a. Ted Danger)
- 1990s – Archaeologist Christopher Begley undertakes a regional survey in Dulce Nombre de Culmí that becomes the basis for his 1999 doctoral dissertation in anthropology at the University of Chicago
- 1997 – Douglas Preston describes Steve Elkins' plans for an expedition in search for the "lost city" in an article in The New Yorker.
- 1998 – Francis Yakam-Simen, Edmond Nezry, and James Ewing claim to have found la Ciudad Blanca using Synthetic aperture radar (SAR)
- 2001 – Actor Ewan McGregor, with Begley and survival expert Ray Mears, films a documentary of the region.
- 2004 – A dirt highway is opened which connects the Rio Platano Biosphere Reserve between Sico on the Sico river and the North Coast highway facilitating illegal logging, drug smuggling, and theft of archaeological artifacts through the department of Colon
- 2008 – Journalist Christopher S. Stewart and archaeologist Christopher Begley attempt to retrace Morde's journey as recounted in Stewart's book Jungleland: A Mysterious Lost City, a WWII Spy, and a True Story of Deadly Adventure
- 2010 – The Honduran government inaugurates the EcoRuta Kao Kamasa (White City Eco-Route) between the town of Santa Maria del Real (formerly Escamilpa), Olancho, through the Pech communities of Dulce Nombre de Culmi, Olancho and to the entrance to the Rio Platano Biosphere Reserve in the municipio of Dulce Nombre de Culmi, Olancho, according to El Heraldo newspaper, the Honduran Tourism Ministry (ITH), and the National Chamber of Tourism (CANATURH). As roads to the area are improved and extended this facilitates the illegal logging, drug smuggling, illegal killing of endangered species in the Biosphere, and theft of archaeological artifacts in the Ciudad Blanca area through Olancho that already exists as shown on the 2011 video "Paradise in Peril" and the 2000 video "Discover the Rio Platano Biosphere in Search of Ciudad Blanca". The difference between trekking through dense jungle in 2000 and cattle ranches in 2011 as far as the eye can see is alarming.
- 2012 – A multidisciplinary team for UTL Productions headed by filmmakers Steve Elkins and Bill Benenson survey the area using LiDAR
- 2015 – A multidisciplinary team for UTL Productions with the participation of archaeologist Christopher Fisher reports archaeological remains in the area, including ruined structures and fragments of zoomorphic stone sculpture. The National Geographic Channel premieres Legend of the Monkey God, a documentary film about the expedition.
- 2016 – Christopher Begley publishes a history of claims for the discovery of Ciudad Blanca. Christopher Fisher and other authors publish the article, Identifying Ancient Settlement Patterns through LiDAR in the Mosquitia Region of Honduras in PLOS One, a peer-reviewed, open-access scientific journal, on August 25.
- 2017 – Douglas Preston, an American author and journalist, publishes the book The Lost City of the Monkey God: A True Story about the history of the search for Ciudad Blanca and the discoveries made by the UTL Productions expeditions and filmmaker Tom Weinberg publishes Chasing the Lost City: Chronicles of Discovery in Honduras with additional primary documentation, including many photographs.
- 2021 - The documentary film Lost City of the Monkey God, produced and directed by Bill Benenson and featuring Steve Elkins, premieres on the Science Channel, which is owned by Discovery, Inc., as a "Spooky Special" on Halloween night.
