= The Lost City of the Monkey God =

2017 nonfiction book by Douglas Preston

The Lost City of the Monkey God: A True Story
- Hardcover edition
- Author: Douglas Preston
- Language: English
- Genre: History, nonfiction
- Published: 2017
- Publisher: Grand Central
- Publication place: USA
- Pages: 326
- ISBN: 9781455569410

The Lost City of the Monkey God: A True Story is a 2017 nonfiction book by Douglas Preston. It is about a project headed by documentary filmmakers Steve Elkins and Bill Benenson that used LiDAR to search for archaeological sites in the Río Plátano Biosphere Reserve of the Gracias a Dios Department in the Mosquitia region of eastern Honduras. The expedition was a joint Honduran-American multidisciplinary effort involving Honduran and American archaeologists, anthropologists, engineers, geologists, biologists and ethnobotanists.

Elkins' search was inspired by rumors of La Ciudad Blanca, also known as the White City. Preston cites mentions by Spanish conquistadors and others. The title of the book derives from four expeditions launched in the 1930s by the Museum of the American Indian (Heye Foundation) in which Honduran informants described to explorers, including Theodore Morde, sensationalized stories of a lost city with a pyramid topped by a giant stone statue of a monkey god somewhere in the Mosquitia region. Preston's book debunks Morde's claim of having found a city.

After a privately funded lidar survey revealed complex archaeological sites under the rainforest cover, Preston accompanied a joint Honduran-American expedition to do ground truthing of the lidar results. They were able to confirm the presence of large abandoned prehispanic settlements and to document plazas, terracing, canals, roads, earthen structures including a pyramid, and concentrations of artifacts, among them decorated cylindrical stone vessels and metates, confirming the existence of an ancient city. The official name of the principal archaeological site that was mapped has been changed to the City of the Jaguar.

Preston also documents the travails of several members of the expedition who contracted severe cases of leishmaniasis, a disease caused by parasites that are transmitted by the bite of sandflies.

The book describes decades of exploration and archaeological surveys in the region as early as the 1920s, as well as the searches of early adventurers for the mythical lost city. Prior to the publication of the book, Preston reported the findings in the New Yorker magazine and National Geographic magazine. The discovery of the city generated criticism from some archaeologists who were not involved in the project.

The book was a number 1 bestseller on the New York Times bestseller list. It was named a notable book of the year by The New York Times and a best book of the year by National Geographic, the Boston Globe, and the American Association for the Advancement of Science.
