= Theodore Morde =

American explorer, journalist, and diplomat (1911–1954)

Theodore A. Morde
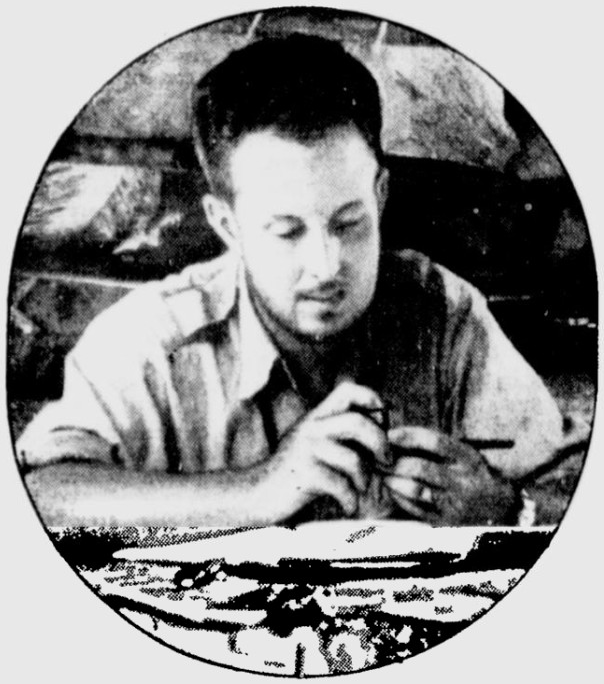
- Theodore Morde seated at his desk while exploring the Honduran rainforest
- Born: March 17, 1911; New Bedford, Massachusetts, U.S.
- Died: June 26, 1954 (aged 43); Dartmouth, Massachusetts, U.S.
- Education: New Bedford High School
- Occupations: explorer, diplomat, and television news producer
- Known for: claiming to have discovered the Lost City of the Monkey God
- Spouse: Gloria E. Gustafson
- Awards: Bronze Star

Theodore A. Morde (May 18, 1911 – June 26, 1954) was an American adventurer, explorer, diplomat, spy, journalist, and television news producer best known for his unverified claim of discovering the "Lost City of the Monkey God."

Morde began his career as a radio announcer before getting into journalism. In 1940, he was hired to lead an expedition to search for the "Lost City of the Monkey God" in Honduras. After five months, he claimed to have found the city and brought thousands of artifacts back to the United States to prove it. He promised to return soon for a proper excavation, but never did, nor did he reveal the precise location of his find.

Morde spent the later years of his life as a diplomat, and then a producer of news films. He killed himself in 1954. In 2013, Christopher S. Stewart wrote a book about Morde and his hunt for a legendary "lost city" that some have equated with la Ciudad Blanca. Douglas Preston's 2017 book The Lost City of the Monkey God shows that, based on Morde's own expedition journals, Morde never found any ruins and completely fabricated his story of having done so.

== Early life ==
Descended from whalers, Theodore A. Morde was born in New Bedford, Massachusetts on March 17, 1911. After graduating from New Bedford High School, he toured Europe.

== Career ==
Morde got a job as a radio announcer for WNBH in New Bedford before taking special classes at Brown University from 1935 to 1936. He then studied with the Hamilton Wright Agency to become a journalist. He later worked at radio stations in Pawtucket, Providence, and San Francisco.

As a journalist, he covered both sides of the Spanish Civil War in 1938. In 1942, he was a correspondent stationed with the British Eighth Army in Northern Africa during World War II. Around the same time, he served as general manager of Reader's Digest Near Eastern edition. In 1947, he covered the Arab side of the Palestine War.

=== Explorer ===
In 1940 George Gustav Heye hired Morde to lead an expedition to Honduras for the Museum of the American Indian. Two previous expeditions, performed by R. Stuart Murray, had turned up rumors of a lost city, which according to Murray the locals called the "Lost City of the Monkey God." In addition to searching for the city, Morde's expedition sought to study the indigenous people of the region, further explore known archaeological sites, and chart the upper reaches of the Wampú River.

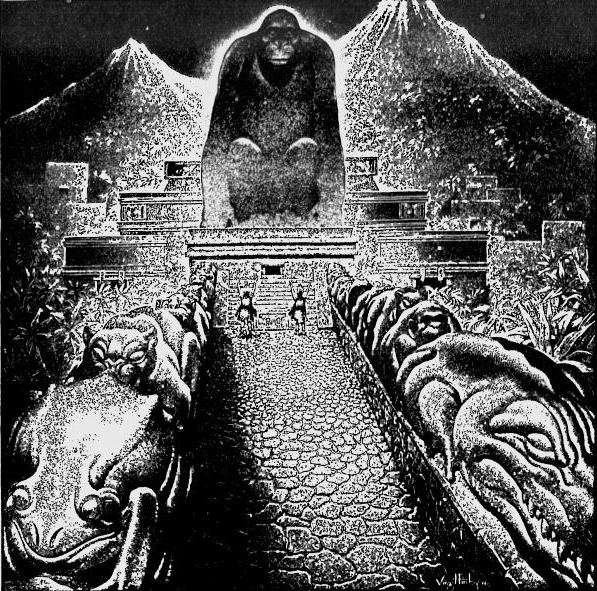
A conceptual drawing of Morde's Lost City of the Monkey God by Virgil Finlay

After four months, Morde and his colleague, Laurence C. Brown, emerged from the forest and sent news of a great find. "'City of the Monkey God' is believed located: Expedition reports success in Honduras expedition" read the headline in the New York Times. When they returned to the states, they brought thousands of artifacts to back their claim that they had found the lost city. They described their find as the capital of an agricultural civilization of the Chorotega people. Artifacts found included blades, a flute, sculptured idols, and stone utensils. Morde and Brown also reported seeing evidence of gold, silver, platinum, and oil in the region. According to Morde, flooding prevented formal excavation, but he planned to return in January 1941.

Morde went on to write a colorful travelogue of his experiences titled "In the Lost City of Ancient America's Monkey God" for The American Weekly. "I am convinced that we have found the site of the legendary Lost City of the Monkey God," he began the travelogue. He described "penetrating far into little known Mosquitia Territory" and warding off "malaria, deadly snakes, vicious insects and jungle beasts" before coming upon the ruins. "Towering mountains" flanked the "ideal setting" where he discovered a walled city with a monkey god that resembled Hanuman from Hindu culture. The temple of the god was not found, but local Paya guides described what it once looked like in detail, allegedly passed down from their ancestors who had seen it.

When Morde asked his guides about the Monkey God, they told him a story of a monkey who had stolen three women. In a story, the monkey and the women bred and made half-monkey half-human children. The half-breeds were hunted three at a time for revenge. A similar story was later told to American anthropologist James Taggart by Nahuat speakers.

According to the stories Morde was told, the monkey god was once worshipped with human sacrifice by Chorotega people. He also described a "Dance of the Dead Monkeys," a still practiced "perverted memory of that old form of worship," according to Morde. In great detail he describes how hunters kill three monkeys apiece and put them in the fire to "dance" as the heat makes their muscles contract. He describes a second legend, "the Sacred Bird of the Chorotegans," where a beautiful queen was changed into a Margarita bird by an evil god Wampai.

Morde never did return to Honduras, or reveal the precise location of his find. His city has been associated with the legend of la Ciudad Blanca in the Mosquitia region of eastern Honduras.

=== Diplomat ===
Morde also had ties to the OSS, and received a bronze star medal for actions in Ankara, Turkey 1943 as a Lieutenant, junior grade. After World War II, he served as a special adviser to the Egyptian Premier for the U.S. government, and as adviser to the Egyptian Ambassador in Washington, D.C.

Later in life, Morde founded Theodore Morde, Inc. to produce news films, and served as the president of Spot News Productions.

== Personal life ==
Morde was married to Gloria E. Gustafson, a model employed by the John Robert Powers Agency. The couple had two children—Christine and Theodore. Morde had a brother and a sister, and was an avid traveler.

== Death ==
On June 26, 1954, Morde was found hanging in the shower stall of his parents' home in Dartmouth, Massachusetts. His death was ruled a suicide by the medical examiner. Conspiracy theorists later asserted sinister forces were behind his death. Some normally reliable sources written much later report that Morde had been run over by an automobile in London, England, "shortly" after his expedition to Honduras.

== Legacy ==
=== Jungleland ===
In 2013, journalist Christopher S. Stewart wrote a book titled Jungleland about the legend of la Ciudad Blanca and Morde. He went to Honduras and undertook an expedition with archaeologist Christopher Begley in 2008 where he attempted to retrace Morde's steps using his original field journals. Stewart interviewed Morde's surviving family members and provided an account of his life. In 2015 archeologists discovered a "lost city" in the region, thought to be associated with the civilization discovered by Morde. At the scientists' urging, the Honduran government dispatched army forces to protect the site from looters.

=== The Lost City of the Monkey God ===
In his 2017 book The Lost City of the Monkey God, Douglas Preston states that Morde fabricated all of his claims about finding a lost city. Preston obtained copies of Morde's expedition journals from the National Geographic Society, which had in turn obtained the journals from Morde's family in 2016. The journals, written by Morde and Brown together, show that they never found any ruins, and indeed, they never searched for any in the first place. Their supposed archaeological expedition was actually a cover; the real purpose of the trip was to search for gold along the Río Blanco, nowhere near the reported location of the purported lost city. Their search for gold was a failure, and the men left the jungle after their supplies ran low and a storm destroyed their equipment. The artifacts the two men supposedly brought back from the lost city were acquired near Brewer's Lagoon after their return from the deep jungle.

The journals do not confirm whether the story about actually finding the fantastic lost city was pre-planned from the start or improvised after their failure to locate gold, although Preston indicates that he believes it was pre-planned. On June 17, 1940, the last day of the expedition, just before emerging from the jungle, Morde wrote, "We are convinced no great civilization ever existed up there. And there are no archaeological discoveries of importance to be made."
