= Los Horcones massacre =

Killings by the Honduran military in 1975

- Native name: Masacre Los Horcones
- Time: 25 June 1975
- Duration: 1 day
- Location: Los Horcones ranch, Olancho, Honduras
- Type: Series of governmental killings
- Motive: Response to a hunger march demanding fair land allocation
- Deaths: 14
- Convicted: José Enrique Chinchilla; Benjamín Plata; Manuel Zelaya; Carlos Bäht

The Horcones Massacre (Spanish: Masacre Los Horcones) was a series of killings centered on the Los Horcones ranch in Olancho, Honduras on 25 June 1975. Up to 14 religious leaders, farmers and students were killed by the Honduran military.

Major José Enrique Chinchilla, Lieutenant Benjamin Plata, José Manuel Zelaya Ordóñez and Carlos Bähr were convicted for their involvement in the massacre. Manuel Zelaya is the father of Manuel Zelaya, who later became the President of Honduras.

== Events ==
Among those killed were Father Iván Betancourt, a visiting Colombian priest working in areas where agrarian reform cooperatives were organizing, and Father Michael Jerome Cypher (Padre Casimiro), a priest visiting from Wisconsin, United States who was tortured to death during an interrogation.

Five farmers were burned alive in a bread oven. The bodies of two priests were castrated and severely mutilated. Two women were thrown into a well alive before the shaft was dynamited.

According to journalist and author Wendy Griffin, "The Massacre of Los Horcones was seen as a clash between the interests of large landowners and the social activism of the church of the time." After the bodies were found, the federal government ordered all priests, monks, and nuns to leave the area for their own safety.

One of the victims was Máximo Aguilera, the father of Christian Democratic Party congressman Lucas Aguilera.

== Convictions ==
José Manuel "Mel" Zelaya, a rich landowner and father of future President Manuel Zelaya, allegedly offered a $2,500 reward for killing Fr Betancourt.

The provincial army commander Major José Enrique Chinchilla, Lieutenant Benjamín Plata, José Manuel "Mel" Zelaya Ordóñez and Carlos Bähr were sentenced to 20 years in prison. Zelaya Jr. visited his incarcerated father often, sometimes sleeping on the prison floor, according to Victor Meza, Zelaya's former interior minister.

The murderers were pardoned by an amnesty decree regarding military crimes passed by the Constituent National Assembly on 3 September 1980. They had spent a little over a year in prison when released on 11 September.

== Legacy ==
According to The Guardian, everyone in the town remembers the slayings. A mass was held in June 2009 for the victims, which brought together survivors including French priest Bernardo Boulang, with senior politicians including Lucas Aguilera, whose father was among those killed.
