= México Indígena =

México Indígena is a project of the American Geographical Society to organize teams of geographers to research the geography of indigenous populations in Mexico. The project's stated objective is to map "changes in the cultural landscape and conservation of natural resources" that result from large scale land privatization initiatives underway in Mexico. The project is led by Peter Herlihy at the University of Kansas and is funded by the U.S. Department of Defense through its Foreign Military Studies Office. The project has been the subject of criticism by various groups including groups representing indigenous peoples. Critics allege that the project was not forthcoming about its U.S. military funding, and that the project has various ulterior motives besides gathering information for research purposes. The project began in 2005, and lasted through 2008.

== Project and objectives ==
The México Indígena was the first in a series of planned projects to enhance United States government geographical data around the world. The stated objective is to produce maps of the "digital human terrain," of the region's indigenous peoples. To accomplish this, the American Geographical Society sent geographers to several regions to gather cultural and GIS data and build relationships with local institutions.

México Indígena was led by a team of geographers who specialize in Latin America, including Peter Herlihy of the University of Kansas, as well as Jeremy Dobson and Miguel Aguilar Robledo.

== Project methods ==
México Indígena's primary method for obtaining and understanding geographic data is participatory research mapping (PRM). In PRM, local investigators, chosen by the communities, are trained by the formal researcher in geographic data gathering techniques. Cognitive mental (individual) maps are converted to consensual (community) maps, including only features whose nature, name, and coordinates have been verified. These are then converted to standardized maps, which the communities may choose to use for educational, political, legal, or other, purposes. Participatory maps of resource-use areas, for example, have been used successfully for indigenous territorial claims in Panama (Herlihy 2003) and elsewhere. México Indígena's primary tool for joining data from different sources to produce maps and to analyze trends is geographic information systems (GIS).

Sponsoring and collaborating institutions and participants of the México Indígena research project have included the University of Kansas (US), the Autonomous University of San Luis Potosí (Mexico), the Foreign Military Studies Office, Radiance Technologies (US), and the Mexican federal environmental ministry SEMARNAT.

"FMSO's goal is to help increase an understanding of the world's cultural terrain."

== Funding ==
The National Association of State Universities and Land-Grant Colleges' International Development Project Database Survey notes that the México Indígena research project has received between $751,000-$1,000,000 from all sources external funds, including: U.S. Department of Defense, Foreign Military Studies Office; U.S. Department of State, Fulbright-Garcia Robles; the American Geographical Society; the University of Kansas' Center of Latin American Studies; Mexico's Secretaria de Medio Ambiente y Recursos Naturales; and the Universidad Autónoma de San Luis Potosí.
