= Brett Velicovich =

American drone specialist

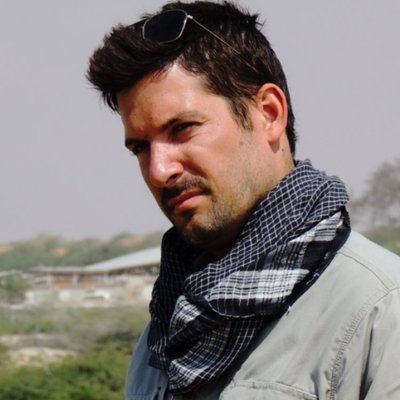
- Brett Velicovich in Somalia in 2012
- Education: Duke University (Master of Business Administration)
- Occupation: Drone Expert
- Notable work: Drone Warrior: An Elite Soldier's Inside Account of the Hunt for America's Most Dangerous Enemies
- Military career
- Allegiance: United States
- Branch: United States Army
- Conflicts: War in Afghanistan; Iraq War
- Website: www.brettvelicovich.com

Brett Velicovich is an American drone expert, former U.S. Army intelligence and special operations soldier. He is known for drone strikes against terrorist leaders and advocating for the use of drones in the protection of African big game wildlife.

== Life ==
Velicovich served multiple tours in Iraq and Afghanistan. He was a U.S. Army special operations intelligence analyst and former Delta Force. Due to his widespread knowledge of lethal drone technology and global travels, multiple media outlets have referred to Velicovich as the “world's most dangerous drone expert.”

The story of his work in counter-terrorism operations and drone strikes against ISIS, Al-Shabaab, and other terrorist groups is the subject of a forthcoming major motion picture developed by Paramount and Michael Bay - an adaptation of the book on Velicovich's life story co-authored by Velicovich and Pulitzer Prize winning Wall Street Journal reporter Christopher S. Stewart.

He earned his MBA from Duke University, and co-founded the first American retail chain focusing entirely on drones, Expert Drones.

In May 2017, multiple news agencies reported that Velicovich had traveled into Mogadishu, Somalia to train the Somali government on using off-the-shelf consumer drones to find members of al-shabaab and uncover roadside bombs. The drones had been donated to the government by his team to help combat the widespread terrorist attacks plaguing the country.

In June 2017, CBS News reported that Velicovich had spent years hunting the notorious leader of ISIS, Abu Bakr al-Baghdadi, with drones. At one point, Velicovich's team had missed al-Baghdadi by mere minutes after tracking him to a house and conducting a raid to capture one of his closest operatives in Baghdad. Velicovich's team had tracked and killed the original leader of ISIS, Abu Omar al-Baghdadi and the leader of AQI, Abu Ayyub al-Masri in a secret operation north of Tikrit, Iraq only months before in April 2010. That same month, Velicovich told GQ Magazine that it was only a matter of time before al-Baghdadi would be found by American forces.

In August 2017, Fox News reported that Velicovich went to Houston, Texas to assist victims in the aftermath of Hurricane Harvey and provide drone support to search and rescue operations. His drones would be used to provide instant damage assessments and help quickly locate victims of the flooding for first responders. Following Harvey, the same news outlet claimed he moved into the path of Hurricane Irma one week later in Florida with a team of volunteer medical personnel to help prepare for the disaster prior to the storm hitting the U.S. mainland.

In July 2018, host Chris Stemp called Velicovich the "world's most dangerous drone expert."

Following talk of plans by the United States Department of the Interior to reverse a ban blocking the importation of elephant trophies back into the U.S. from Zimbabwe and Zambia, Velicovich spoke out publicly against the idea, stating that the significant decline in elephant populations over the last decade was the result of poaching activities and corrupt African government actions. Velicovich further stated that by reversing the ban, it would increase the demand for the killing of elephants for their ivory, destroying years of global wildlife conservation efforts.

As early as March 2022, Velicovich appeared to have crossed the Ukrainian border to extract trapped American citizens and other Westerners stranded during the initial Russian invasion. Further reports also allege Velicovich may have been quietly funneling life saving drone technology to the front lines of Ukraine to help Ukrainian soldiers fight Russian troops.

In July 2025, U.S. President Donald Trump took to social media to personally praise Velicovich regarding his knowledge of drone technology and publicly thanking him, stating: "Thank you also to Brett Velicovich, who really knows his “stuff.”

In March, 2026, The Wall Street Journal reported that Eric Trump and Donald Trump Jr. invested in and acquired a substantial stake in U.S. defense firm Powerus, a drone company founded by Brett Velicovich and former U.S. military veterans. The story indicated Velicovich and other founders of Powerus intended to take the company public on the stock market via reverse merger.

== Media ==
Velicovich is a frequent guest on major national news outlets, including CNN and Fox News, where he provides commentary on national security related issues. He has regularly appeared on shows including Hannity, Gutfeld, Fox and Friends, CNN Newsroom, and CBS This Morning.

Velicovich became an official Fox News paid contributor in early 2022, focused on providing national security related commentary to the news network.

In January 2020, CNN interviewed Velicovich about the assassination of Iranian General Qasem Soleimani and Velicovich's previous work tracking him, to which Velicovich replied that the intelligence community had been watching Soleimani for decades move around as if he was "untouchable" and "he had it coming to him."

Following the death of ISIS leader Abu Bakr al-Baghdadi in October 2019, Fox & Friends hosts interviewed Velicovich, where he discussed the significance of al-Baghdadi's death and the critical intelligence information behind the scenes that went into the special operations raid in Syria. Velicovich played a critical role in the death of al-Baghdadi's predecessor in 2010, the original leader of the Islamic State, Abu Omar al-Baghdadi.

Velicovich has been quoted on various news outlets warning about the dangers of ISIS modifying consumer drones to conduct improvised attacks in the United States. On Fox News Fox & Friends, he noted that ISIS fighters overseas have been adapting easily accessible consumer drone technology to conduct attacks against security forces in Iraq and have returned home from the battlefield with the knowledge to conduct similar strikes.

Following the U.S. strike on Iran, Velicovich appeared on multiple news outlets discussing the significance of new U.S. military one way attack drones utilized in battle and modeled after Iranian Shahid variants.

== Philanthropy ==
Velicovich has been affiliated with several nonprofits related to humanitarian and anti-poaching causes. He currently is supporting the Humanitarian Aid and Rescue Project, Mara Elephant Project, Bancroft Global Development and Global Outreach Doctors.
