= Juan Francisco Bulnes =

- Municipality
- Location in Honduras
- Coordinates: 15°57′51″N 84°57′05″W
- Country: Honduras
- Department: Gracias a Dios
- Villages: 7

Area
  - Total: 734.96 km^{2} (283.77 sq mi)
- Elevation: 10 m (33 ft)

Population (2015)
  - Total: 6,407
  - Density: 8.717/km^{2} (22.58/sq mi)
- Time zone: UTC-6 (Central America)

Juan Francisco Bulnes (Spanish pronunciation: [ˈxwaɱ fɾanˈsisko ˈβulnes]) is a municipality in the Honduran department of Gracias a Dios.

The total population of the municipality was 6,407 in 2015. The rivers Abajo and Platano along with the lagoon of Ibans form the major water systems of the municipality. Almost all the localities are located next to these water systems with Ibans being the biggest. The only health centre of the municipality is located in Ibans.

== Demographics ==
At the time of the 2013 Honduras census, Juan Francisco Bulnes municipality had a population of 6,392.

By 2018, the municipality had a population of 6,440 inhabitants, composed of 3,292 men and 3,149 women. The entire population was classified as rural.
