= Villeda Morales, Honduras =

Villeda Morales
- Municipality
- Location in Honduras
- Coordinates: 15°4′N 83°18′W
- Country: Honduras
- Department: Gracias a Dios
- Villages: 15
- Named for: Ramon Villeda Morales

Area
  - Total: 587.77 km^{2} (226.94 sq mi)

Population (2015)
  - Total: 10,335
  - Density: 17.583/km^{2} (45.541/sq mi)
- Time zone: UTC-6 (Central America)

Villeda Morales is a municipality in the Honduran department of Gracias a Dios. It was named after a former president named Ramón Villeda Morales

== Demographics ==
At the time of the 2013 Honduras census, Ramón Villeda Morales municipality had a population of 10,314. Of these, 87.90% were Indigenous (87.78% Miskito), 11.69% Mestizo, 0.21% Afro-Honduran or Black, 0.11% White and 0.09% others.
