= La Ruta Moskitia Ecotourism Alliance =

The La Ruta Moskitia Ecotourism Alliance is a collection of six ecotourism enterprises which are owned and operated by local indigenous communities. The Alliance provides ecotourism products and services within the Rio Platano Biosphere Reserve in Honduras. The goal of the Alliance is to direct the financial benefits of sustainable tourism initiatives to local communities. Sustainable tourism practices can help prevent locals from overhunting, overfishing, and overusing the land in the bio reserve. The La Ruta Moskitia Ecotourism Alliance started with the support of Rare, the conservation and wildlife protection organization, as well as the United Nations.

While La Ruta Moskitia seems to have stopped functioning in 2012–2014, in late 2014, the community requested a grant from the United Nations to restart its activities.

== Accomplishments, awards, and recognition ==
The Rio Plátano Biosphere Reserve, which lies in the heart of La Moskitia, is a 2-million-acre (8,100 km^{2}) UNESCO World Heritage Site. Through time the operations, products, and services from the Alliance have already injected more than $350,000 into the local communities, created 250 jobs, and supported 1500 immediate family members in the Reserve.

Awards and recognition include the Conde Nast Traveler's Green List in 2006 and recommendations from Moon Handbook for Honduras, Lonely Planet, and Outside Magazine. These international rewards were related to poverty alleviation and biodiversity conservation.

== Destinations ==
The Río Plátano Biosphere Reserve and La Mosquitia are compiled of several unique regions. These regions make up La Ruta Moskitia. Regions included in the La Ruta Moskitia tour packages are:

- The Great Pine Savannah region: Brus Laguna and Yamari Savannah Cabanas
- The Miskito Coast region: Belen and Raista
- The Garifuna Coast region: Plaplaya and Batalla
- The Rainforest Highlands region: Las Marias
