= Gracias a Dios Department =

Department of Honduras

Gracias a Dios Department Departamento de Gracias a Dios
- Department
- Flag

- Location of Gracias a Dios in Honduras
- Coordinates: 15°16′N 83°46′W
- Country: Honduras
- Municipalities: 6
- Villages: 69
- Founded: 21 February 1957
- Capital city: Puerto Lempira

Government
  - Type: Departmental
  - Governor: Kennedy Calderon (2022–2026) (LibRe)

Area
  - Total: 15,876 km^{2} (6,130 sq mi)

Population (2015)
  - Total: 94,450
  - Density: 5.949/km^{2} (15.41/sq mi)

GDP (Nominal, 2015 US dollar)
  - Total: $100 million (2023)
  - Per capita: $800 (2023)

GDP (PPP, constant 2015 values)
  - Total: $200 million (2023)
  - Per capita: $1,800 (2023)
- Time zone: UTC-6 (CDT)
- Postal code: 33101
- ISO 3166 code: HN-GD
- HDI (2021): 0.550 medium · 17th of 18
- Statistics derived from Consult INE online database: Population and Housing Census 2013

Gracias a Dios (Spanish pronunciation: [ˈɡɾasjas a ˈðjos]; "Thanks to God" or "Thank God") is one of the 18 departments (departamentos) into which Honduras is divided. The departmental capital is Puerto Lempira; and up until 1975 it was Brus Laguna. It covers north-eastern Honduras, and it is the second largest department of the country after Olancho, which is 16,630 km^{2}.

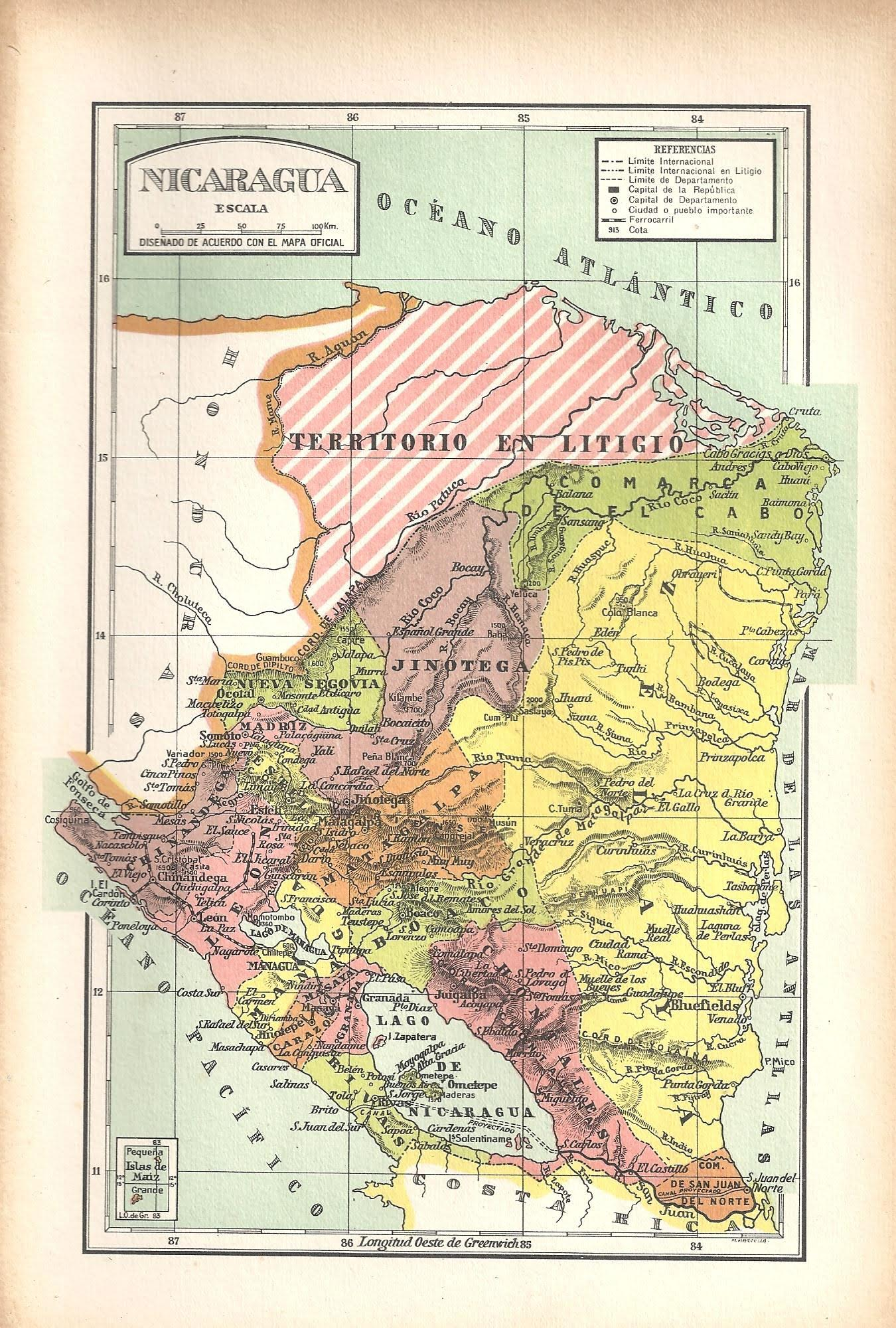
Map showing the northern limits of Mosquitia.

== Etymology ==
The department is named in honor of Christopher Columbus's landing in 1521. He is reported to have said "gracias a Dios hemos salido de esas Honduras" when he departed this part of Honduras for the Nicaraguan coast.

== History ==
Gracias a Dios was formed in 1957 from parts of the Colón and Olancho departments, with the boundary running along 85° W from Cape Camarón to Cape Gracias a Dios, and covers the easternmost part of Honduras along the Mosquito Coast.

== Geography ==
Gracias a Dios department covers a total surface area of 16,997 km^{2} and, in 2015, had an estimated population of 94,450. Although it is the second largest department in the country, it is sparsely populated. The department is rather remote and inaccessible by land, although local airlines fly to the main cities. It covers the easternmost part of Honduras along the Mosquito Coast. It is a region of tropical rainforest, pine savannah, and marsh that is accessible primarily by water and air. Gracias a Dios has the largest wilderness area in Central America, consisting of mangrove swamps, lagoons, rivers, savannas, and tropical rain forests. The Río Plátano Biosphere Reserve, a World Heritage site, is a part of Gracias a Dios.

While the jungle rainforest can be utilized for tourism, limited facilities and connecting transportation make it a challenge. The community-based-tourism project La Ruta Moskitia Ecotourism Alliance wishes to work around those issues.

Most of the territory is a very hot and humid plain, crossed by numerous streams and rivers, including the Plátano, Patuca, Waruna, and Coco rivers. The largest coastal lagoon in Honduras, Caratasca Lagoon, is in the region. It is shallow, with saline water, and is separated from the sea by a thin stretch of sand.

== Climate ==
The climate of Gracias a Dios promotes the growth of a dense tropical forest, which is now set aside for preservation. The Río Plátano Biosphere Reserve, part of the so-called "great lungs" of Central America, covers nearly 7% of Honduran territory. It is home to a great diversity of flora and fauna. Among its many species are the jaguar, tapir, peccary, crocodile, manatee, garza (heron), and White-headed capuchin (monkey).

== Demographics ==
Its population includes indigenous, Afro-Indigenous, and Afro-descended ethnic groups. such as the Tawahka, Miskito, Pech, Rama, Mayangna, Garífuna, Ladino, and Creole peoples.

The population in 2008 exceeded 80,000 inhabitants, representing a population density of 4.8 inhabitants/km^{2}, the lowest in the country. The primary income of the population is derived from lobster diving. As of 1997, there was no tourism activity in the area.

At the time of the 2013 Honduras census, Gracias a Dios Department had a population of 90,795. Of these, 81.15% were Indigenous (79.70% Miskito, 0.95% Mayangna), 16.30% Mestizo, 1.58% Black or Afro-Honduran, 0.82% White and 0.15% others.

== Crime ==
Gracias a Dios is known to be a place of relatively high crime. Due to its remoteness and the Honduran government having a relatively low ability to fight crime, trafficking of narcotics is common in Gracias a Dios. Criminal organizations are also common in the area.

== The White City ==
On March 2, 2015, the National Geographic announced that an expedition into the region discovered a previously unknown ruined city. The expedition was seeking the site of the legendary "White City" (La Ciudad Blanca), also known as the "City of the Monkey God", a goal for Western explorers since the days of the Spanish conquistadors in the sixteenth century. The team mapped plazas, earthworks, mounds, and an earthen pyramid belonging to an unknown culture. The team also discovered a cache of stone sculptures at the base of the pyramid structure.

A paper published in 1999 located and mapped the site using Synthetic-aperture radar based on information obtained from local inhabitants during an expedition to the area in 1993.

The ruins were again identified in May 2012 with the use of LIDAR and subsequently explored in secret with the assistance of the Honduran military. The team documented the site, but left it unexcavated. To protect the site its location is not being revealed.

== Municipalities ==
1. Ahuas
2. Brus Laguna
3. Juan Francisco Bulnes
4. Puerto Lempira
5. Villeda Morales
6. Wampusirpi
