= Target One =

Target One, also called T1, is an ancient Mesoamerican city described by author Douglas Preston as located in the mountains of the Mosquitia region in the easternmost part of the modern state of Honduras (this despite the fact that there are no mountains in this part of the country). T1 is of particular archaeological significance because unlike any other Mesoamerican city ever recorded, T1, once abandoned, was not rediscovered by either local inhabitants nor expeditionary European explorers/ conquistadors until 2013 when it was finally revealed using LIDAR technology under purely speculative premises.

Whatever its name or significance, the T1 site was almost certainly abandoned following an influx of European diseases (particularly small pox and measles) which began devastating Central and South America in the 16th century. These diseases wiped out as much as 90% of the native population, leaving the remainder unable to sustain a viable social culture and causing widespread collapse. The last few survivors appear to have deliberately broken their religious artifacts and sculptures, and to have piled them together near the city center before departing the area. Over the last 500 years no one has wandered into the area, and so it has never been looted like most such sites.

In August 2016, the UTL team published an account of their findings on T1 in a peer-reviewed, online journal. A popular account of the expedition appears in a 2017 book by Douglas Preston.
