= Edwin M. Shook =

American archaeologist (1911-2000)

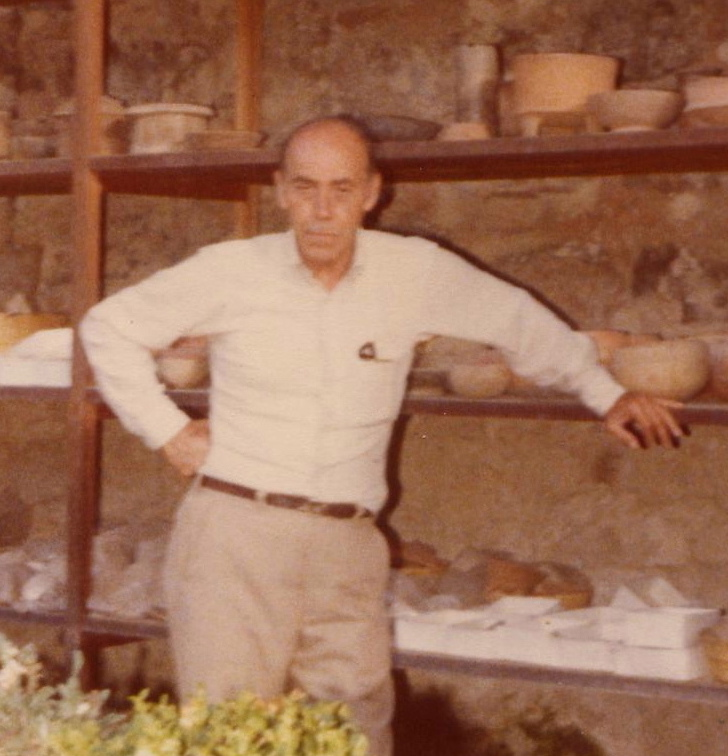
- Ed Shook at his home in Antigua Guatemala, 1979
- Born: November 22, 1911; Newton, North Carolina, United States
- Died: March 9, 2000 (aged 88); Antigua Guatemala, Guatemala
- Occupation: archaeologist

Edwin M. Shook (22 November 1911 – 9 March 2000) was an American archaeologist and Mayanist scholar, best known for his extensive field work and publications on pre-Columbian Maya civilization sites.

Shook was born in Newton, North Carolina. At age 22 he took a job as a draftsman at the Carnegie Institution of Washington which was to lead him into Mesoamerican studies from 1934 to 1998. In 1955, he became the field director of the University of Pennsylvania's Tikal Project, overseeing and publishing extensive work at Tikal, the largest Classic Maya site. Other Maya sites Shook worked at include Uaxactun, Copán, Mayapan, Kaminaljuyu, Piedras Negras, Palenque, Seibal, Chichen Itza, and Dos Pilas, in addition to pre-Columbian sites in Costa Rica.

In 1998 Shook donated his archives to the Universidad del Valle de Guatemala. He died at his home in Antigua Guatemala two years later.
