= Peter Herlihy =

Peter Herlihy, University of Kansas geographer, the Associate Director and Graduate Advisor, Latin American Studies, University of Kansas and field director of the controversial U.S. DOD funded México Indígena project known as the Bowman Expeditions, an initiative of the American Geographical Society to organize international teams of geographers to research potentially important place-based issues and restore the role of geographers as advisers to U.S. government foreign policy makers. The stated objective of the México Indígena project is to produce maps of the “digital human terrain,” of the region's indigenous peoples.
