= Wendy Griffin =

Honduran journalist

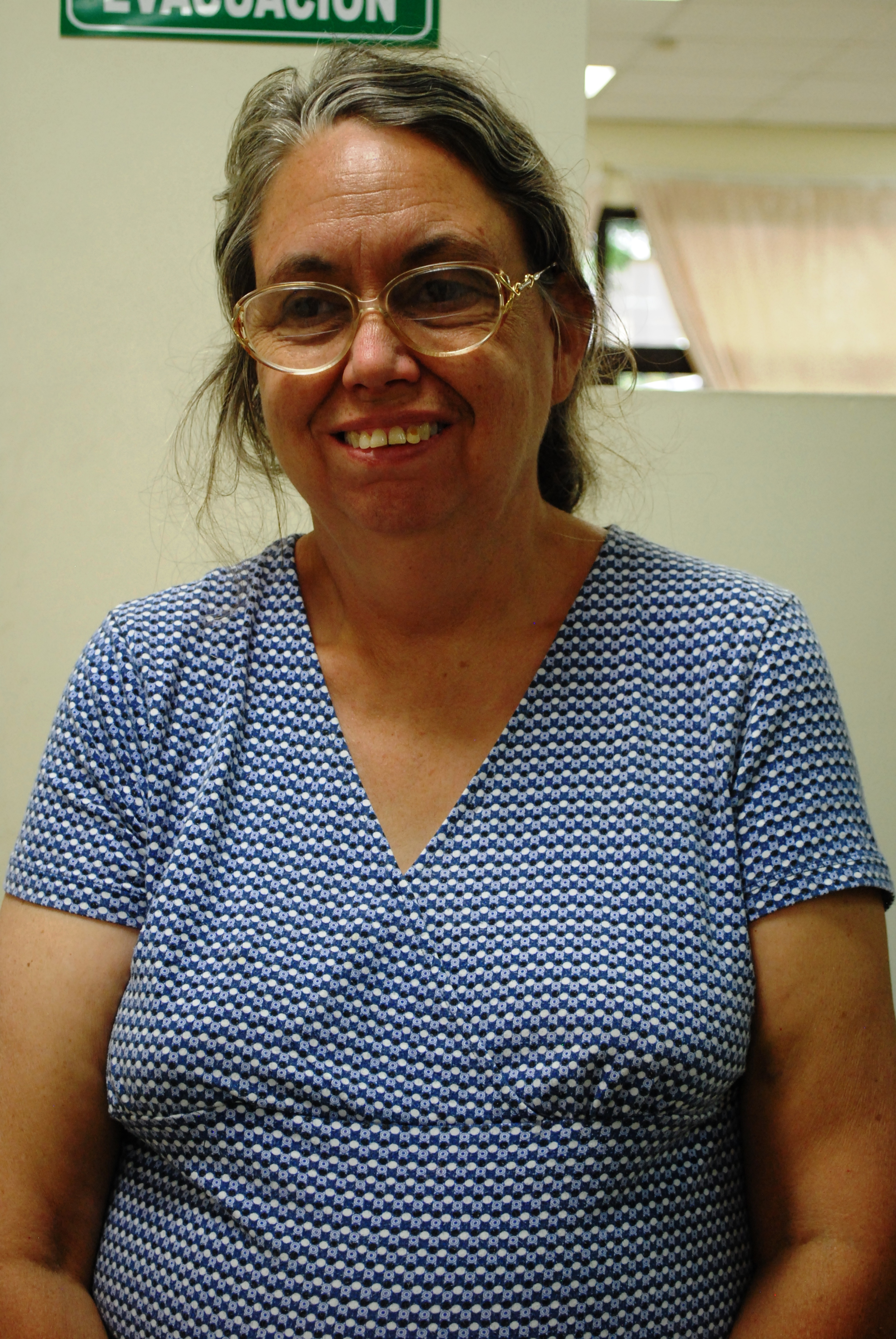
Wendy Griffin in 2013

Wendy Griffin is a journalist, author and translator. She is originally from Pittsburgh, PA. She previously taught at the Escuela Superior del Profesorado (now UPN, Universidad Pedogogica Nacional) and the National Autonomous University of Honduras (UNAH) in Tegucigalpa. She wrote two hundred and fifty articles for Honduras This Week and lived in Honduras for many years. She wrote extensively on the Garifuna, Pech and Miskito people of Honduras. This led to her interest in La Ciudad Blanca (Spanish for the White City) and her appearance in the movie The Search for Ciudad Blanca. Her collection of more than sixty Honduran folk artwork and handicraft pieces are part of the Burke Museum's Contemporary Culture Collection.
