= Rosemary Joyce =

American anthropologist and social archaeologist

Rosemary A. Joyce
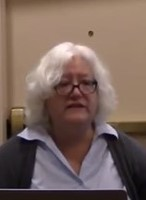
- Born: Rosemary Alexandria Joyce; April 7, 1956 (age 70); Lackawanna, New York

Academic work
- Discipline: Anthropologist; Archaeologist
- Sub-discipline: Mesoamerican Archaeology
- Institutions: University of California, Berkeley

Rosemary A. Joyce (born 1956) is an American anthropologist and social archaeologist who has specialized in research in Honduras. She was able to archeologically confirm that chocolate was a byproduct of fermenting beer. She is also an expert in evaluating the archaeological records of society and the implications that sexuality and gender play in culture.

== Biography ==
Rosemary A. Joyce was born in 1956. She is a Professor of Anthropology at UC Berkeley.

== Research ==
Joyce has conducted social archaeology in Honduras since 1977, focusing on analysis of households, ceramics and the cultural roles of sex and gender which are found in both the material remains and physical remains of Mesoamerican societies. Central America and Mexico were regions where sexuality and gender in ancient societies began being studied in the 1960s. Iconography showed that women had held positions of power in society even though men were more often portrayed than women. Joyce has stated that artistic works show that young males were often subjects being viewed by both men and women, which indicates a more fluid gender spectrum.

In a comparative study conducted in tandem with Lynn Meskell, who has done similar studies on ancient Egyptian society, Joyce and Meskell contrast Maya civilization and that of the New Kingdom of Egypt. On the one hand, both societies existed before Plato's concept in dualism—the mind and body are separate—entered into acceptance. Also in both cultures, the archaeological remains tend to be objects, writings, and images of elite males. Both were phallic cultures but in Egyptian imagery the penis is exaggerated and perfect male bodies are the subject of female adoration. In the Mayan culture, penile imagery is also exaggerated, but typically the phallus is hidden, but highlighted, and offered by a young male to the gaze a politically dominant male. Egyptian women appear to be sexualized, even as girls, indicating no demarcation between childhood and adulthood, but Mayan women appear as unsexualized beings and are usually draped unless suckling an infant. Thus studies can give insight not only into how ancient worlds viewed sexuality and gender roles but how objects they used might have been used differently. Spiritual practices also show the concepts of sexuality and gender were different in pre-conquest Mesoamerica, as throughout the region deities, like the Mayan corn or moon gods, had both male and female attributes.

Another aspect of Joyce's work was a study conducted with John Henderson, an anthropologist from Cornell University. Traces of cacao found on Honduran pottery shards were examined and discovered to have been used to produce beer. Initially the pod was fermented and the seeds discarded. At some point, ancient beer makers began to use the seeds to make a non-alcoholic beverage, which was a bitter chocolate drink. To confirm their findings, Joyce and Henderson contacted archaeometrist Patrick McGovern and chocolate chemist for Hershey Chocolate, Jeffrey Hurst, to analyze the residues. They confirmed the presence of theobromine, a chemical found in cacao, but rare in other plants. The research connected the Honduran site to Mayan cacao fields which were thousands of kilometers away. Though clear evidence of trade, studying the civilizations in Honduras, Joyce found that they do not have the same social inequality as existed in the Maya world. Institutionalized power did not take hold and evidence points to smaller cities linked together in which "women were as likely as men to have held positions of power".

== Honors ==
- 2022 Alfred Vincent Kidder Award from the American Anthropological Association
- Honorary doctorate, Leiden University in 2022

== Selected publications ==
Joyce, RA 2020, The future of nuclear waste: what art and archaeology can tell us about securing the world's most hazardous material, Oxford University Press.

Joyce, RA and SD Gillespie (eds.) 2015, Things in Motion: Object Itineraries in Anthropological Practice, School for Advanced Research.

Hendon, JA, Joyce, RA and J Lopiparo 2014, Material Relations: The Marriage Figurines of Prehispanic Honduras, University Press of Colorado.

Joyce, RA 2008, Ancient Bodies, Ancient Lives: Sex, Gender, and Archaeology, Thames and Hudson.

Joyce, RA and LM Meskell 2003, Embodied Lives: Figuring Ancient Maya and Egyptian Experience, Routledge.

Hendon, JA and RA Joyce (eds.) 2003, Mesoamerican Archaeology: Theory and Practice, Wiley-Blackwell.

Joyce, RA 2002, The Languages of Archaeology: Dialogue, Narrative, and Writing, Wiley-Blackwell.

Joyce, RA 2001, Gender and Power in Prehispanic Mesoamerica, University of Texas Press.

Joyce, RA and SD Gillespie (eds.) 2000, Beyond Kinship: Social and Material Reproduction in House Societies, University of Pennsylvania Press.

== Bibliography ==
- Nelson, Sarah M. (1 January 2006). Handbook of Gender in Archaeology. Lanham, Maryland: Rowman Altamira. ISBN 978-0-7591-0678-9.
- Price, T. Douglas; Burton, James H. (2010). An Introduction to Archaeological Chemistry. New York: Springer Science & Business Media. ISBN 978-1-4419-6376-5.
