= Río Plátano Biosphere Reserve =

- IUCN category II (national park)
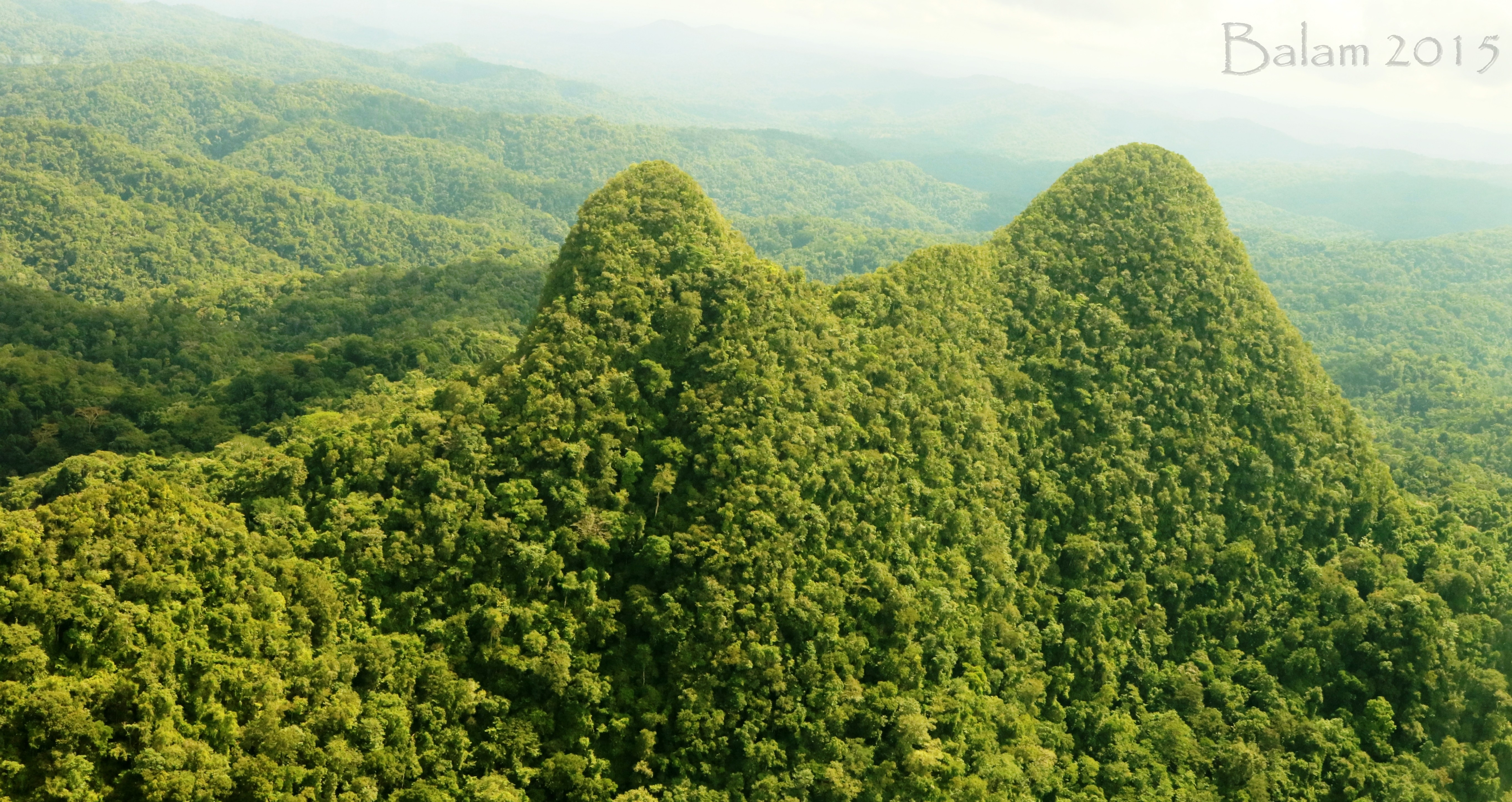

- Location within Honduras
- Location: northeastern Honduras
- Nearest city: Palacios
- Coordinates: 15°44′40″N 84°40′30″W
- Area: 5,300 km^{2} (2,000 mi^{2})
- Established: 1982
- Governing body: Department of Protected Areas & Wildlife, State Forestry Administration
- Location within Honduras

UNESCO World Heritage Site
- Criteria: Natural: (vii), (viii), (ix), (x)
- Reference: 196
- Inscription: 1982 (6th Session)
- Endangered: 1996–2007; 2011–present
- Area: 350,000 ha (860,000 acres)
- Buffer zone: 150,000 ha (370,000 acres)

The Río Plátano Biosphere Reserve is a protected area in the Gracias a Dios department region on the Caribbean coast of Honduras. With a total area of 5,250 square kilometers (2,030 mi^{2}), most of the reserve runs along the Río Plátano. The reserve has a number of endangered species and some of the largest remnants of tropical forest in Central America. It has been a World Heritage Site and biosphere reserve since 1982. In 2011, UNESCO placed the reserve on the List of World Heritage in Danger.

The reserve encompasses both mountainous and lowland tropical rainforest, full of diverse wildlife and plant life, and has more than 2000 inhabitants. The reserve is part of the Mesoamerican Biological Corridor that stretches from Mexico southward through Central America.

Although the reserve covers a large portion of Honduras, very little is recorded about the biological diversity within it. While previous management plans have proven successful, a continued investigation into ongoing management plans and future conservation issues will be necessary to keep this valuable reserve safe. Currently, there are threats to the conservation of the reserve which include illegal hunting, logging, and clearing of land to graze cattle. Recent rafting expeditions from the Rio Plátano headwaters through all three zones of the reserve (cultural, buffer, and core) have documented cattle grazing in the core zone, commercial fishing and hunting camps along the river, and clear cutting of forest near Las Marias.

== History ==
In 1960, the land was set aside as the "Ciudad Blanca Archaeological Reserve", named after the rumored ancient settlement known as la Ciudad Blanca. The reserve was renamed "Río Plátano Biosphere Reserve" in 1980 and added to the World Heritage list in 1982.

A management and development was designed in 1980 and implemented in 1987 by the Department of Natural Renewable Resources. In 1997, an additional 3250 km^{2} was designated as a buffer zone for the reserve. In 1997, the German Development Bank began a plan that would significantly expand the reserve to the Patuca River and the Bosawas Biosphere Reserve in Nicaragua. Currently, the German plan has been delayed.

=== Archeological sites ===
The reserve still has over 200 archeological sites, including the point where Christopher Columbus first arrived in mainland America. The reserve also contains ruined settlements, including stone from buildings and roads, rock carvings, and other remains.

Few of these sites are well-protected; in fact, many of them have been looted and the others are at risk from increased tourism. Although the archeological value of the region initially played a large part in the formation of the reservation, the reservation currently focuses mostly on the protection of the forests.

According to tradition, the legendary settlement of La Ciudad Blanca is located in the region. Over the years, many professional and amateur archeologists have claimed to find it, but none have produced credible evidence and most professionals remain skeptical that it ever existed.

== Local population ==
The reserve is home for more than 2,000 indigenous people and a growing number of migrant inhabitants. The population includes four very different and unique cultural groups: Miskito, Pech, Garifunas, and the ladino. The smaller groups, the Pech, Garifunas, and Miskito inhabitants live mostly in the north, alongside the river. These people have a variety of rights to the land and mostly use the land for agriculture. The smaller-scale agriculture of the Pech is easily made sustainable. Many of the largest group, the ladino, entered the reserve from the south. Conflict over land rights is a prominent source of conflict between ethnic groups. Current conflict over land rights involves non native peoples invading and threatening indigenous land owners—forcing them from their historical lands.

== Conservation ==
In 1996 the reserve received the World Heritage in Danger designation, because of increased logging and agricultural expansion. A reserve management plan, implemented in 2000, included macrozoning, subzoning, and specific plans for conservation issues. The macrozoning plan established buffer zones, cultural zones, and nucleus zones. The overall threat, especially in the nucleus zones, had decreased in 2006 recognizing a significant improvement in conservation efforts, leading to the removal of the World Heritage in Danger designation in 2007. However, subsequent investigations in 2010 and 2011 showed that these conservation gains did not last. UNESCO recently (2011) did a mission to the Rio Plátano and found illegal activity within the core zone. Drug smuggling, clearing of land for cattle grazing, and illegal fishing and hunting along the river are currently happening. In 2011, UNESCO returned the reserve to the List of World Heritage in Danger.

The area is protected by policy from the Department of Protected Areas & Wildlife, State Forestry Administration in Honduras, and receives some funding from the World Wildlife Fund and other private organizations. A number of governmental and non-governmental organizations and committees have developed and implemented conservation plans in the region. The main goal of the reserve is to protect the land from deforestation and development.

The reserve's conservation plan aims to integrate local inhabitants into their environment via sustainable agricultural practices (see La Ruta Moskitia Ecotourism Alliance). Indigenous populations play a large part into the success of the conservation plan, both inside the reservation and outside the reservation in the buffer zones. Assigning titles and recognizing de facto property rights played an important part of the beginning of the conservation plan in the reserve, although the conservation plans for the reserve must be updated to keep pace with regional changes.

The conservation plan requests continued commitment to clarifying land ownership in and around the reserve. More research needs to be done to understand the value of the reserve and the potential threats it faces. There are currently no park guards or any official entity actively patrolling or guarding the reserve.

== Climate ==
The annual precipitation is between 2,850 and 4,000 mm (112 and 157 in), and the local inhabitants have noticed a trend towards dryer seasons over time. The climate in the region is key to preserving the valuable wet forests and important for the agriculture upon which the indigenous people depend.

The reserve also receives an average of four severe tropical storms every ten years. The tropical storms echo through the rest of the reserve through the numerous waterways. Development plans and agriculture depend upon the river's natural levees to drain water from low-lying areas. The after-effects of the Hurricane Mitch in 1998 disrupted the development of the Patuca II hydroelectric facility.

== Geography ==
The land stretches from La Moskitia coast through lagoons and along the Río Plátano up into the mountains. The buffer area also includes the Paulaya and Sico valley, and will eventually extend to the Patuca River. The reserve is mostly mountainous, including Pico Dama, a giant granite formation, and Punta Piedra, the highest peak at 1,326 m (4,350 ft).

The reserve includes nearly the entire watershed of the Río Plátano, and many other smaller waterways. Much of the region is covered with mountainous terrain. The rivers wind through both the lower and mountainous regions. The forms many oxbows as it crosses the long stretch of flat lowland that separates the foothills from the lagoons. The river has created oxbow lakes, marshes, and natural levees.

The geography of the region makes agriculture and conservation especially complicated. The low-land areas covered with water throughout the winter, and the rivers and the various tributaries house a wide variety of flora. The coastal region to the north is more commonly documented, so the rest of the region needs more thorough exploration.

== Flora and fauna ==
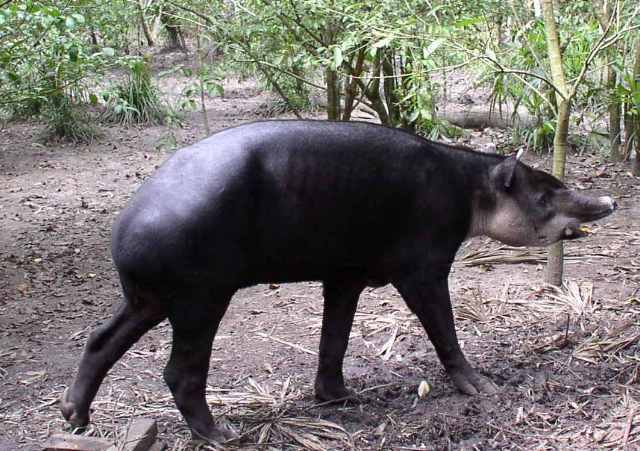
Baird's tapir

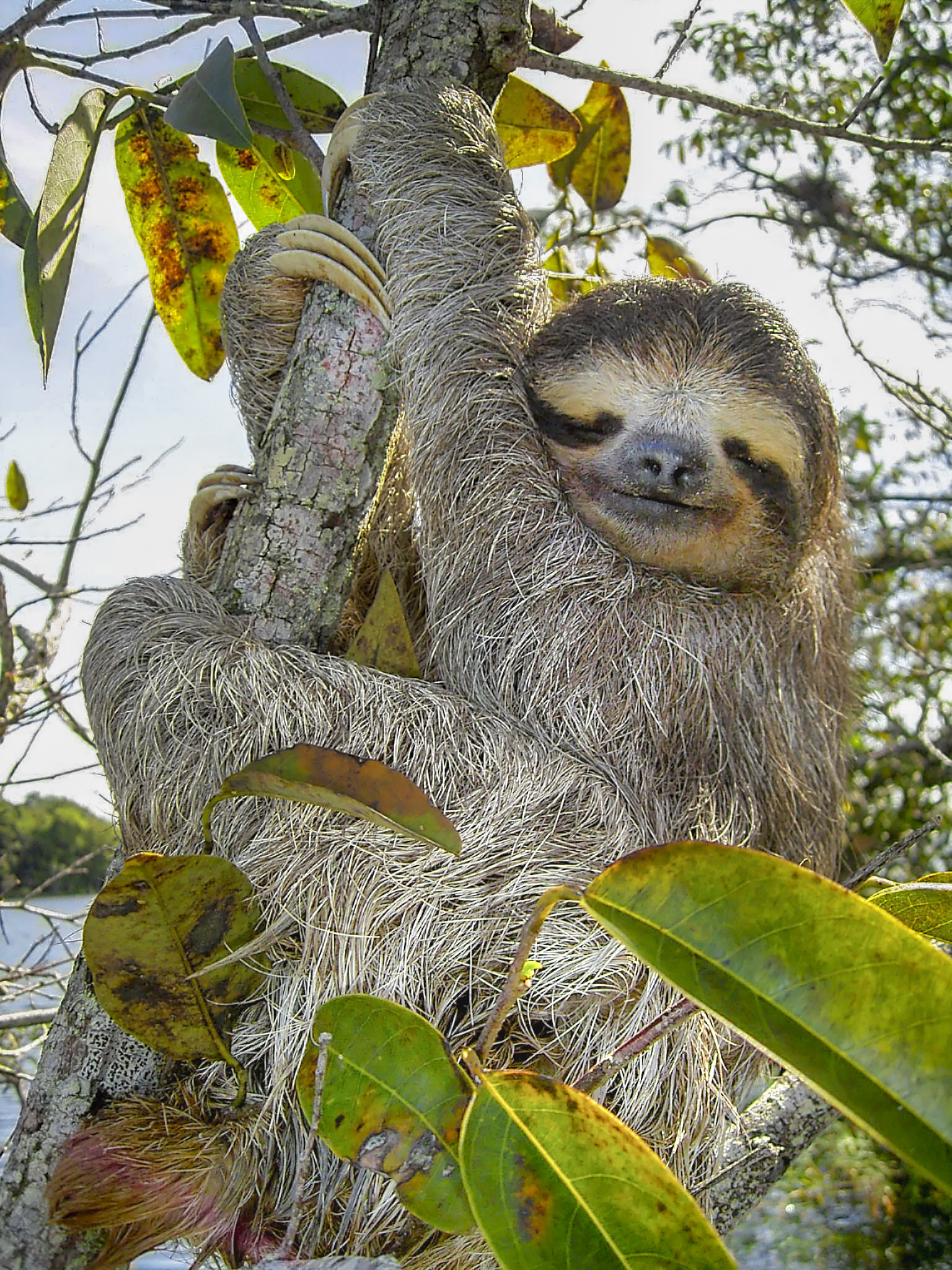
Brown-throated sloth

The reserve contains part of the largest surviving area of undisturbed tropical rainforest in Honduras and one of the few remaining in Central America, with numerous endangered species. Although there is a growing amount of research available on the biodiversity within the reserve, the current management plans emphasize the need for more research on the flora and fauna of the region, especially near rivers.

=== Flora ===
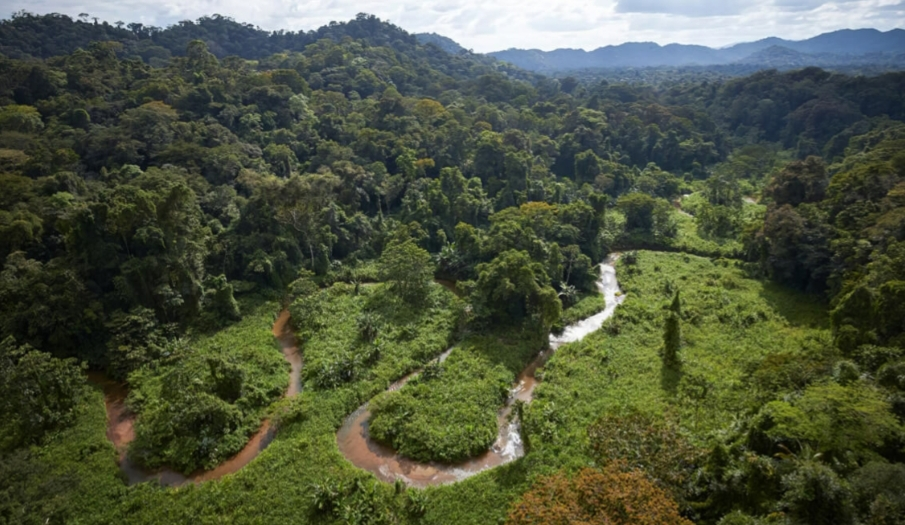
Selva tropical de la Biosfera de rio plátano

The major ecosystems include mangrove and freshwater swamps and marshes, sedge prairie, pine savanna, and gallery forest. There is a diverse amount of flora, estimated at over 2,000 species of vascular plants, although little has been written about it because many species are new or undiscovered.

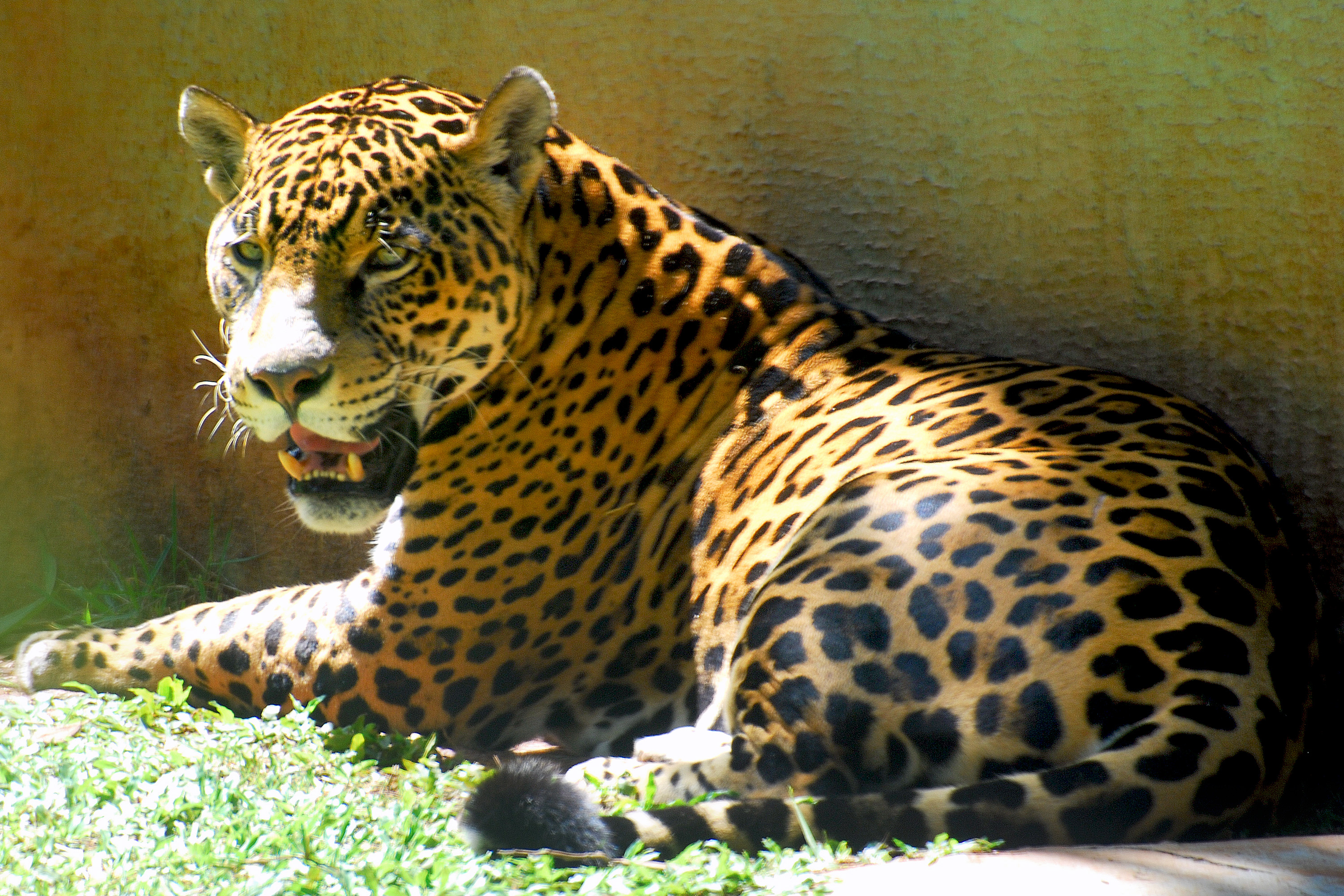
Jaguar

There are two major mangrove ecosystems along the coast: the Brus Lagoon and the Iban Lagoon. The Brus area is 120 km^{2} and brackish, and the Ibans area is 63 km^{2} and freshwater. The mangroves are valuable and fragile, so they are a significant part of the value of the reserve.

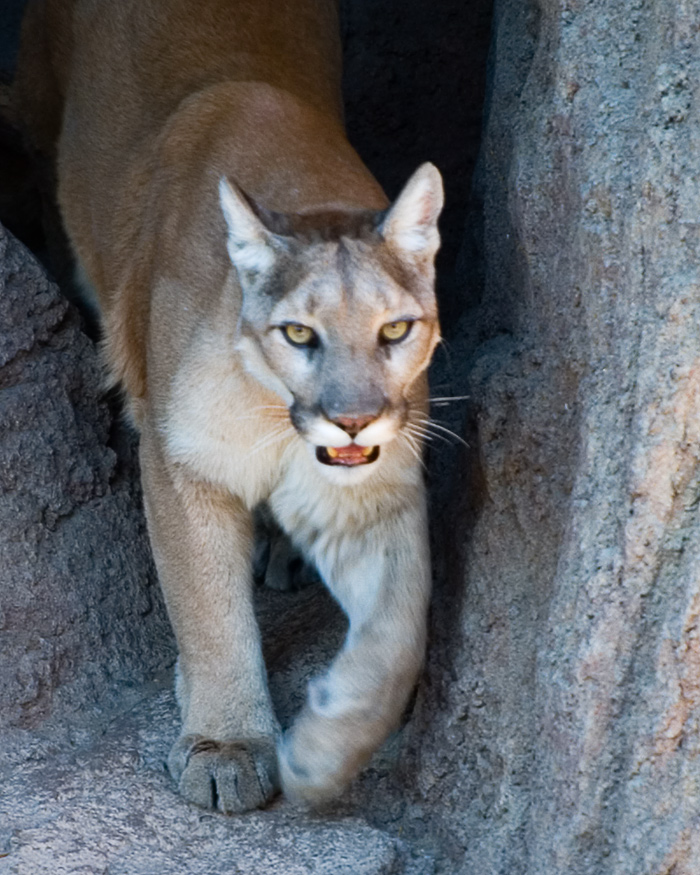
Puma

Further in, the land becomes prairie and savannah with pine and palm, depending upon the availability of water. Along the watershed of the rivers, the vegetation is thick wet forest, which is again, poorly studied.

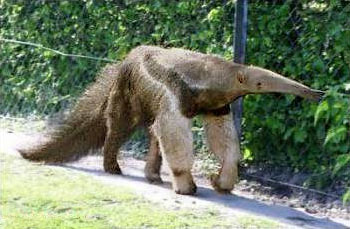
Giant anteater

=== Fauna ===
The documented fauna of the region includes 39 species of mammals, 377 species of birds and 126 species of reptiles and amphibians. The region is particularly rich with birds, including the king vulture, harpy eagle, great curassow, crested guan, scarlet macaw, green macaw and military macaw.

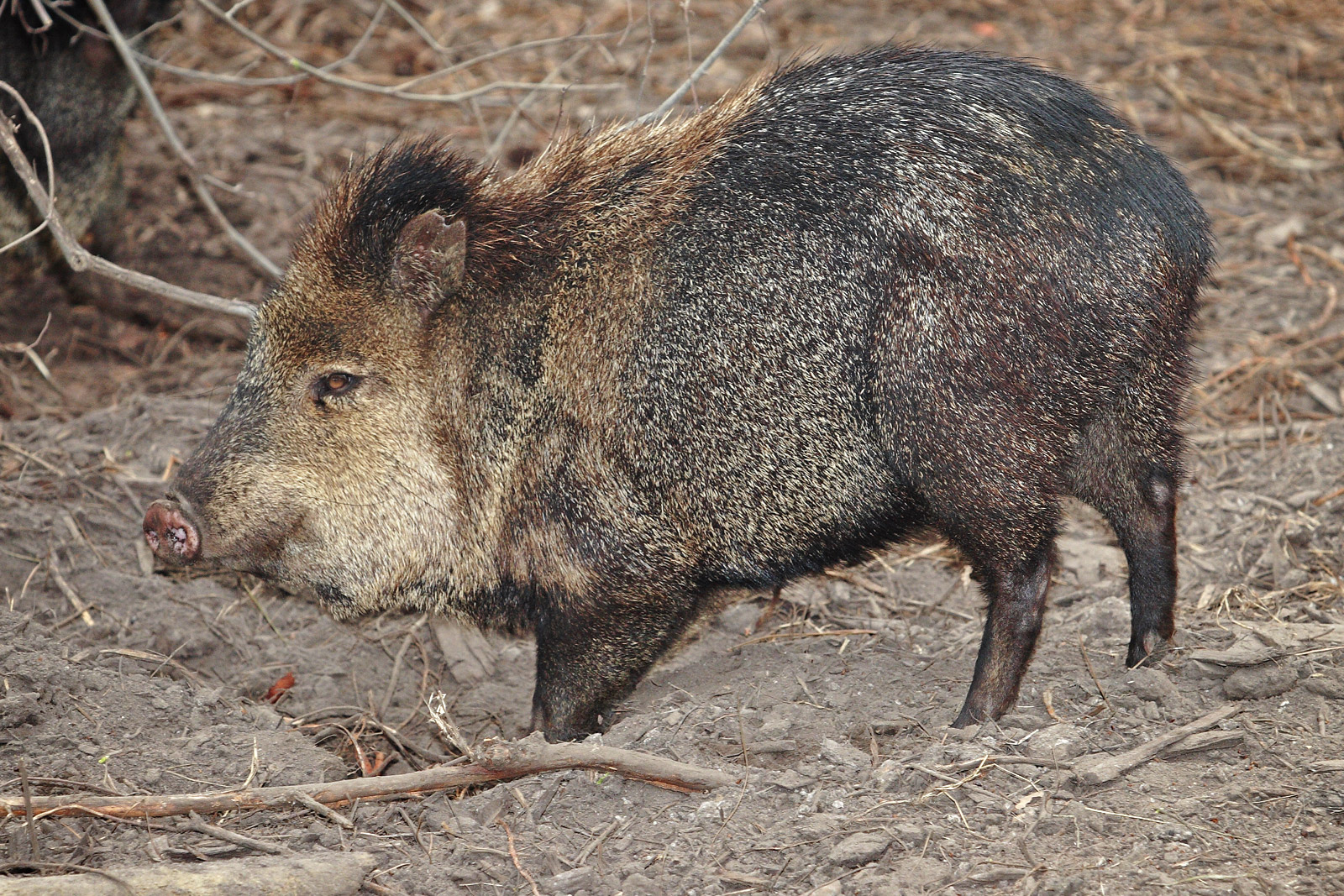
Collared peccary

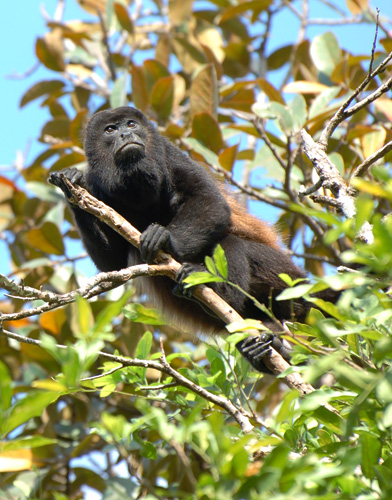
Mantled howler

Mammal species commonly found within the reserve include white-headed capuchin, mantled howler and spider monkeys, brown-throated sloth, paca, kinkajou, coatimundi tayra, Central American otter, puma, collared peccary, white-lipped peccary and red brocket deer.

Because of the reserve's large size and relatively undisturbed forests, it is home to large populations of several rare or endangered mammal species. These include Baird's tapirs, giant anteaters, jaguars, ocelots, margays, and Caribbean West Indian manatees. The first jaguar filmed in Honduras was filmed in the reserve in 2007. The amount of environmental education that exists in Honduras is minimal, so it is difficult to protect these endangered species. The widespread poverty and lack of accurate research on the ecosystems makes protection increasingly difficult. While the conservation programs are reaching their goals, it is difficult to tell whether or not the management plans are successfully protecting these species directly. Protecting the ecosystems, like the rainforest, upon which the endangered species depend serves as an important indirect benefit.

== Tourism ==
The high density of wildlife along the coast Gracias a Dios department makes it a popular destination for ecotourists. Although private organizations are launching ecotourism enterprises throughout the region, the government does not have a comprehensive plan to control or benefit from ecotourists. Ecotourism can offer relief for poverty stricken local populations, increased awareness of biological value, and can generate income that can be used to fund projects for the reserve. Currently there are guided 10- to 12-day rafting trips being offered down the entire length of the Rio Plátano.

Although a properly implemented tourist industry could benefit the reserve, the currently unregulated industry has created a large amount of traffic and damaged archeological sites. The tourism industry has an impact across the entire reserve, but the unprotected archeological sites are especially hurt. Without developing infrastructure, it is difficult to have a profitable and sustainable ecotourism industry, especially in a reserve with difficult conservation issues.

== Conservation issues ==
Despite progress in conservation being made since 2006, the reserve still faces a few significant conservation threats. Logging and development continue to be problems, and the situation is exacerbated by an increasing population from poorer parts of Honduras or refugees from Nicaragua.

=== Logging ===
The government regulates the logging industry in Honduras through the Honduran Cooperation for Forestry Development. Despite oversight of these and other organizations and a moratorium on logging inside the reserve, mahogany continues to be cut and removed. The Honduran government has failed to pass laws strict enough to have a substantial impact on preventing deforestation. The entire reserve could quickly disappear, even through unregulated deforestation.

Local populations admit that a large amount mahogany is leaving the reserve, but many poorer sections of the economy see the high price of mahogany as enough incentive to clear away valuable ecosystems that provide irreplaceable services to the water and soil. The loggers behind much of the reserve's deforestation is still mostly unknown.

=== Development ===
Development within and around the reserve poses a problem for the conservation plans. The construction of the Patuca II hydroelectric plant in the Patuca river highlights the elements of the debate. A hydroelectric plant does more than affect the waterway where it is built. It also requires infrastructure that disturbs the environment around it. A lot of the reserve does not have developed roadways or power. A hydroelectric facility would require development throughout the reserve.

Agriculture throughout the reserve poses a more direct threat. As the populations expand within the reserve, so do their agricultural operations. Much of the wetland area is unsuitable for agriculture, needing levees and continued development to be productive. Much of the non-legal de facto ownership has spurred conflict, sometimes violent, among different cultural groups over rights to agriculturally productive areas.

Poorer farmers resort to destructive techniques, like slash-and-burn, that are particularly damaging to the savannah and prairie land. Although the current management plan aims to educate farmers about these destructive practices, they continue. Future management goals aim to promote sustainable technique among a larger number of the traditional farmers.

=== Refugees ===
Poverty in Honduras and neighboring Nicaragua, and an increasing number of hurricanes, have driven many refugees into the reserve, making conservation efforts increasingly complicated. These refugees often enter through the south of the reserve, and sometimes create more conflict integrating with the indigenous populations. While traditional farming practices can be somewhat destructive, the stress created by larger populations is much more damaging to the reserve.

Currently, the Honduran Corporation for Forestry Development with the help of the Honduran Public Safety Force polices the reserve, hoping to decrease the number of people who invade. Regardless of their efforts, refugees continue to enter. The reservation considered a plan to relocate refugees outside the reserve, creating both an increased buffer and reducing the stress within the reserve. This plan was met with political opposition.

== See also ==
- Gracias a Dios
- List of World Heritage Sites
