= Steve Elkins =

American cinematographer and explorer

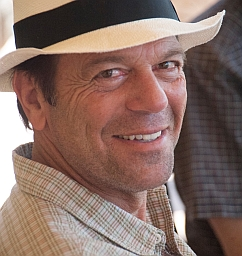
- Steve Elkins in Honduras, 2012
- Born: March 27, 1951 (age 74); Chicago
- Occupation: Cinematographer/Explorer
- Known for: LIDAR and Lost City project in Mosquitia

Steve Elkins (born March 27, 1951) is an American cinematographer and explorer.

== Early career ==
Steve Elkins started his professional career as the director of an outdoor and environmental education program for the Van Gorder-Walden School in Chicago. During this time, he also worked as a field researcher for paleo-climate studies at the University of Wisconsin. While attending the Southern Illinois University and receiving a B.S in Earth Science, he conducted an archeological survey and test excavation of a rock shelter site he discovered.

Moving to California in 1979, Elkins first worked in petroleum engineering before deciding to pursue his growing interest in cinematography.

Working in the TV and film industry for over 30 years, Elkins earned numerous industry awards. In 1985, he received a gold medal at the International Film and TV festival of New York (now the New York Festival) . He received CINE Golden Eagle awards in 1987 and 1999 for originality and excellence in storytelling in the media. In 1992 Elkins won an Emmy at the 44th annual Los Angeles Area Emmy Awards in the category "Camera crew - non-news" for his work on the program Drug Watch L.A. He won the California Tourism Award for Best Video in 1999 awarded by the California Travel Association for best video promoting tourism in California. He later received a Telly Award in 2003 for creative excellence. Elkins's desire to incorporate his scientific interests with media production allowed him to film around the world on a great variety of programs with science related themes.

In 1994, while researching ideas for a production and subsequently filming in the north-western Mosquitia region, he became fascinated with the lost city legends pervasive to the area. It became a personal quest to prove or disprove the validity of these legends which led him on a more than twenty three-year journey. Elkins is a Fellow in the Explorers Club and the Chair Person of their Southern California Chapter.

== Mosquitia ==
After reading about the success of airborne lidar as a tool to map archaeological ruins in jungle terrain he formed a partnership with Bill Benenson in 2012 and created a company (UTL..Under The Lidar) to explore the Mosquitia jungle with lidar and produce a documentary about the experience. The results included the discovery of two significant and undocumented archaeological sites which were in the area purported to contain a legendary lost city.

Elkins and Benenson were selected as two of Foreign Policy Magazine's Leading Global Thinkers of the Year for proving airborne lidar could successfully be used as a tool of discovery and exploration in extremely thick jungle canopy. Their project was featured in the May 2013 issue of The New Yorker magazine titled, "The Eldorado Machine."

Elkins was the project leader of a 2015 ground expedition to verify the sites discovered in 2012. He assembled a multi-disciplinary scientific team to glean as much information as possible from the expedition. The results created headlines across the globe including an article in the October 2015 issue of National Geographic ("Lure of the Lost City") and an October 2015 episode of National Geographic Explorer ("Legend of the Monkey God)".

Both missions were done with the participation of the Honduran government (under two separate administrations) which initiated further archaeological excavation and survey. In addition, the project highlighted the problem of illegal deforestation which the current President has been working to mitigate. President Juan Orlando Hernández along with other officials, including the Minister of Science and Technology, visited the site accompanied by Elkins.

Author Douglas Preston accompanied the 2015 expedition to Honduras and wrote a non-fiction book about the lost city project entitled The Lost City of the Monkey God: A True Story published by Grand Central (subsidiary of Hachette) in January 2017. A CBS Sunday Morning television segment featured Preston and the Elkins expedition. More recently, Elkins presented a TEDx talk on his expedition to the Lost City. A children's book entitled Secrets of the Lost City by Sandra Markle describing the expedition and its discoveries has also been published.

In recognition of his work with the Lost City, he was awarded The 2021 Explorers Club Citation of Merit.

== See also ==
- La Ciudad Blanca
