= Cabo Camarón =

Cape in Honduras

Cabo Camarón (literally, "Cape Shrimp") is a cape located on the Caribbean coast of Honduras at 15°59′09″N 85°01′32″W. It is notable as the territory that Diego López de Salcedo of Trujillo contracted to conquer for Spain, and as the focus of territorial waters disputes for access to the fishing.
