= Wampú River =

Location
- Country: Honduras

The Wampú River (Spanish pronunciation: [wamˈpu]) is a river in Honduras.

== See also ==
- List of rivers of Honduras
