= Plátano River =

Coordinates: 15.8772°N 84.7028°W

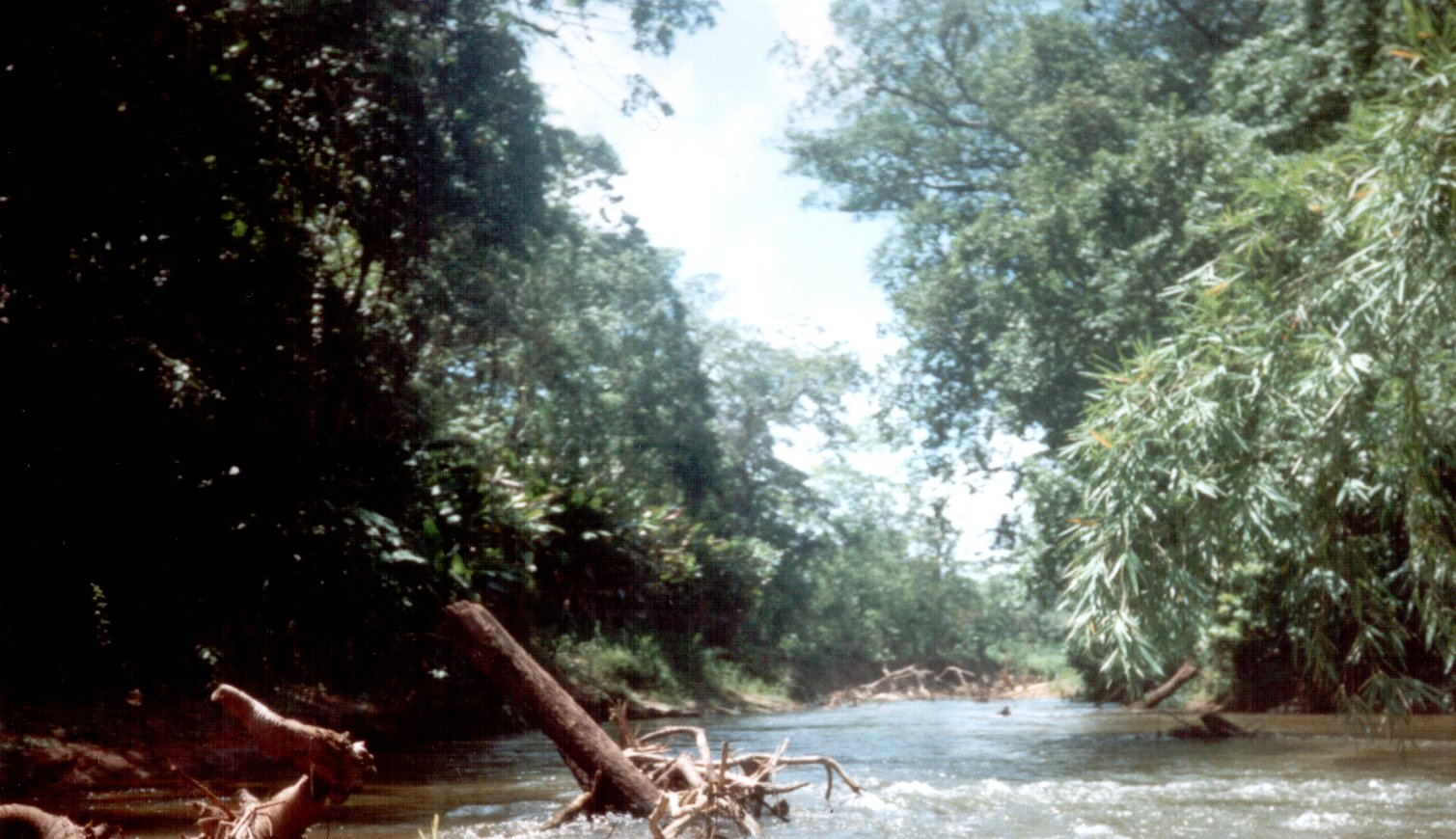

Location
- Country: Honduras

The Plátano River (Banana River) is a river in Honduras which runs through the Río Plátano Biosphere Reserve.

== See also ==
- List of rivers of Honduras
