= Christopher S. Stewart =

American author and investigative reporter

- Born: Ithaca, New York
- Occupations: Journalist, Author
- Employer: The Wall Street Journal
- Awards: Pulitzer Prize for Investigative Reporting 2015; Gerald Loeb Award for Investigative 2015; IRE FOI Award 2014; Gerald Loeb Award for Video 2023

Christopher S. Stewart is an American author and investigative reporter for The Wall Street Journal, which he joined in 2011. In 2015, he won the Pulitzer Prize for Investigative reporting with several colleagues for a series of articles exposing abuses in the Medicare system.

He was formerly a contributing editor at Conde Nast Portfolio, where, among other things, he wrote about the Unification Church's gun business, Iran sanction busting, and corruption in Iraq. His story about Iraq's top cop was at the center of a Congressional inquiry into fraud and waste.

He was later the deputy editor at The New York Observer.

Stewart has written for various magazines, including The New York Times Magazine, GQ, New York, The Paris Review, Harper's and Wired, among others.

He is the author of Hunting the Tiger, a definitive portrait of one of the Balkans most dangerous men during the region's wars in the 1990s. His second book, Jungleland, is about a lost city in Central America and an American spy who claimed that he'd found it.

He lives in New York. Stewart is the co-author of the book Drone Warrior about the life of Brett Velicovich, which received CIA approval in 2016. The book has been optioned by Paramount Pictures for a biographical film to be produced by Michael Bay.

== Awards ==
- 2015 Pulitzer Prize for Investigative Reporting for "Medicare Unmasked" as part of The Wall Street Journal team
- 2015 Gerald Loeb Award for Investigative business journalism for "Medicare Unmasked"
- 2014 IRE FOI Award for "Medicare Unmasked"
- 2023 Gerald Loeb Award for Video for "How Russia Stole Ukraine's Grain"
