= 2005 Pacific typhoon season =

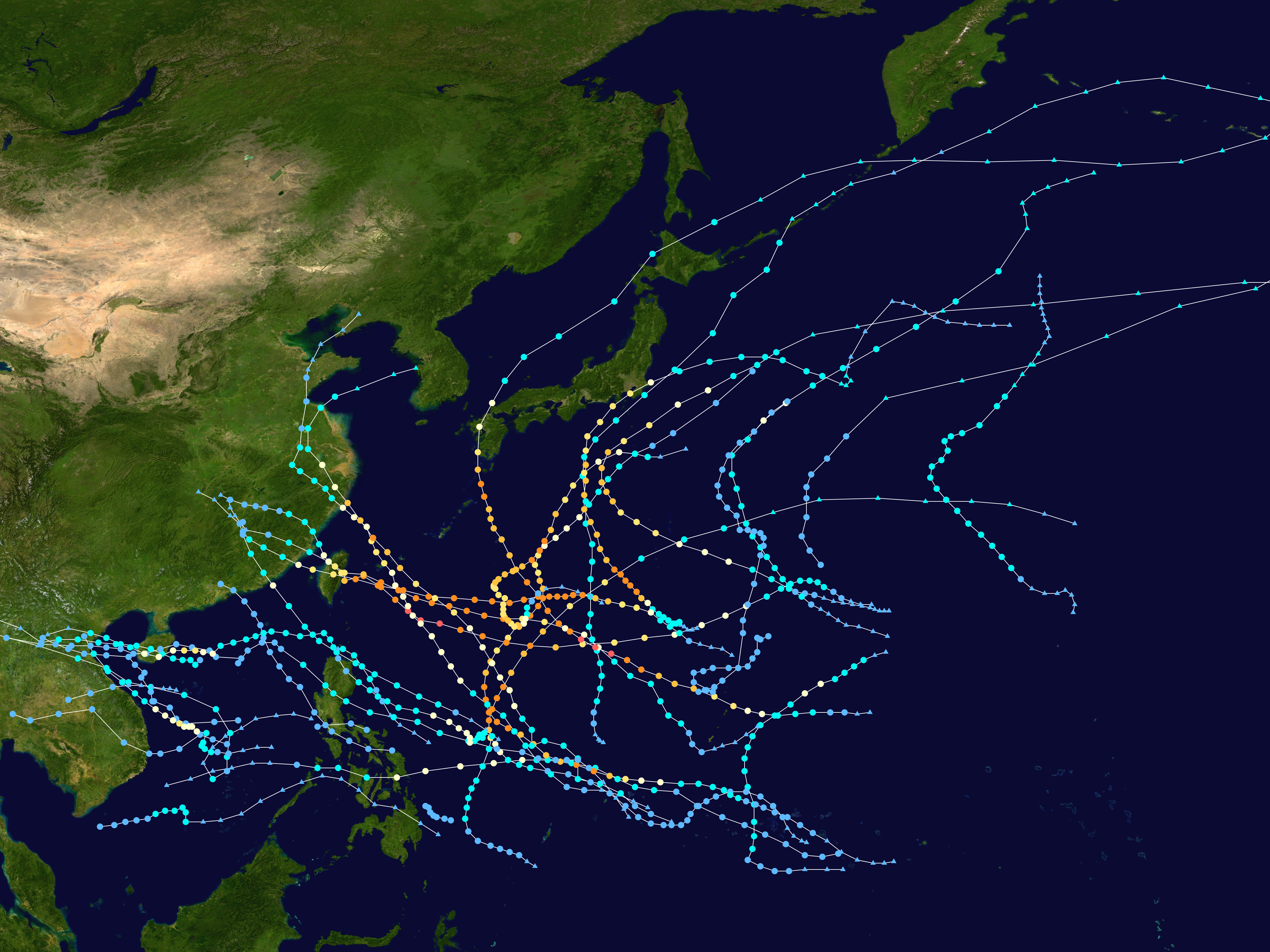
- Season summary map

Seasonal boundaries
- First system formed: January 13, 2005
- Last system dissipated: December 21, 2005

Strongest storm
- Name: Haitang
  - Maximum winds: 195 km/h (120 mph) (10-minute sustained)
  - Lowest pressure: 920 hPa (mbar)

Seasonal statistics
- Total depressions: 33
- Total storms: 23 official, 2 unofficial (Note: The tropical depressions on August 9-12 and August 27-30 were recognized as tropical storms by Vietnamese National Center for Hydro-Meteorological Forecasting. According to Vietnamese NCHMF, these systems reaching its peak intensity with highest winds and lowest pressures of 65 km/h (40 mph), 996 hPa (mbar) and 65 km/h (40 mph), 1000 hPa (mbar), respectively.)
- Typhoons: 13
- Very strong typhoons: 9
- Violent typhoons: 1
- ACE: 308.8
- Total fatalities: 702 total
- Total damage: $9.89 billion (2005 USD)

Related articles
- Timeline of the 2005 Pacific typhoon season; 2005 Atlantic hurricane season; 2005 Pacific hurricane season; 2005 North Indian Ocean cyclone season

The 2005 Pacific typhoon season was the least active typhoon season since 2000, producing 23 named storms, of which 13 became typhoons (including 3 super typhoons). It was an event in the annual cycle of tropical cyclone formation, in which tropical cyclones form in the western Pacific Ocean. The season ran throughout 2005, though most tropical cyclones typically develop between May and November. The season's first named storm, Kulap, developed on January 13, while the season's last named storm, Bolaven, dissipated on November 20. The season's first typhoon, Haitang, reached typhoon status on July 13, and became the first super typhoon of the year three days later.

The scope of this article is limited to the Pacific Ocean, to the north of the equator between 100°E and the 180th meridian. Within the northwestern Pacific Ocean, there are two separate agencies that assign names to tropical cyclones, which can often result in a cyclone having two names, one from the JMA and one from PAGASA. The Japan Meteorological Agency (JMA) will name a tropical cyclone should it be judged to have 10-minute sustained wind speeds of at least 65 km/h (40 mph) anywhere in the basin, while the Philippine Atmospheric, Geophysical and Astronomical Services Administration (PAGASA) assigns names to tropical cyclones which move into or form as a tropical depression in their area of responsibility located between 135°E and 115°E and between 5°N–25°N regardless of whether or not a tropical cyclone has already been given a name by the JMA. Tropical depressions that are monitored by the United States' Joint Typhoon Warning Center (JTWC) are given a number with a "W" suffix.

== Seasonal forecasts ==
TSR forecasts Date	Tropical storms	Total Typhoons	Intense TCs	ACE	Ref
Average (1965–2004)	26.8	16.9	8.6	305	
March 14, 2005	25.9	16.1	9.8	340	
May 5, 2005	27.6	17.5	8.9	314	
June 7, 2005	27.6	17.5	9.4	328	
July 7, 2005	27.6	17.5	9.5	333	
August 5, 2005	27.6	17.5	9.4	328	
Other forecasts Date	Forecast Center	Period		Systems	Ref.
April 27, 2005	GCACIC	January–December		25 tropical cyclones	
June 24, 2005	GCACIC	January–December		24 tropical cyclones	
2005 season	Forecast Center	Tropical cyclones	Tropical storms	Typhoons	Ref
Actual activity:	JMA	33	23	13	
Actual activity:	JTWC	25	24	18	
Actual activity:	PAGASA	17	14	12	

During the year several national meteorological services and scientific agencies forecast how many tropical cyclones, tropical storms, and typhoons will form during a season and/or how many tropical cyclones will affect a particular country. These agencies included the Tropical Storm Risk (TSR) Consortium of University College London, PAGASA and Taiwan's Central Weather Bureau. Some of the forecasts took into consideration what happened in previous seasons and the La Niña conditions that were observed during the previous year.

On March 14, TSR published their extended range forecast for the 2005 season, in which the anticipated that they would see tropical activity slightly below the average. They predicted that there would be a total of 25-26 tropical storms and 16 typhoons. The TSR, however, forecast that their number of intense typhoons would go slightly above the average, bringing their prediction of 10 intense typhoons. Their main reasons behind this is due to weaker trade force winds occurring in many parts of the basin, and there would be an enhanced cyclonic vorticity over the northwestern part of the Pacific. On April 27, the GCACIC made their first forecast for the season, expecting about 24 tropical storms developing, in which 15 of them would strengthen into typhoons. By May 5, TSR published their first forecast, still predicting a near average typhoon season. Around this time, 27-28 tropical storms, 17-18 typhoons and 9 intense typhoons were predicted, with the slight increase of the number of tropical storms were due to a slight increase in temperatures within the Niño 3.75 region.

TSR's second forecast was released on June 7, now predicting a slightly above average season, with the only change for their predicted cyclone numbers was a slight increase of intense typhoons to 9.4. The GCACIC made their second and final forecast for the season on June 24, slightly increasing their numbers to 25 tropical storms and 16 typhoons. The TSR maintained their predictions after their third forecast update on July 5. Sea-surface temperatures within the Pacific were predicted to be more warmer than that predicted back in the May forecast. On August 5, TSR released their fourth and final forecast for the season, still remaining the same numbers along with the same reasonings.

== Seasonal summary ==
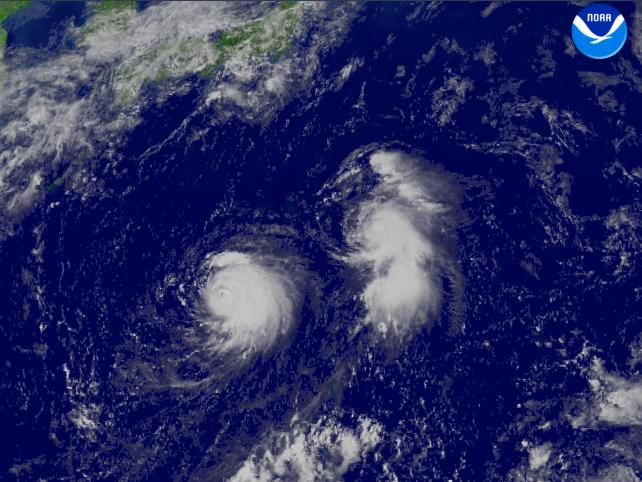
Two simultaneous active tropical cyclones on August 22; Typhoon Mawar (left) and Tropical Storm Guchol (right)

The Accumulated Cyclone Energy (ACE) index for the 2005 Pacific typhoon season as calculated by Colorado State University using data from the Joint Typhoon Warning Center was 309.9 units.

The 2005 season was a near-average season, the number of typhoons in the year was twenty-three, much less than the average of twenty-seven. The number of typhoons that made landfall in Japan was three, which is almost the average (2.6). In general, this is not a year in which the impact of typhoons has been especially notable. The number of typhoons that passed near Okinawa was eight, which is slightly larger than the average of seven, and this is because this year there are some typhoons moving through the Sakishima Islands towards the Taiwan or China. This year's major typhoons are reviewed below.

Although the season was quiet, some typhoons caused extensive damages in many places, especially in China where eight typhoons struck the country. First, Typhoon Haitang became the strongest storm in the basin this year and caused about $1.1 billion in damages in Taiwan and China in mid July. In August, Typhoon Matsa made landfall in Eastern China and caused about $2.23 billion in damages. Later that same month, two powerful typhoons made landfall, causing extreme damage and some casualties. Similar to Haitang, Typhoon Longwang made landfall in Taiwan and China at a strong intensity causing damages.

== Systems ==
=== Severe Tropical Storm Kulap ===
- Severe tropical storm (JMA)
- Category 1 typhoon (SSHWS)
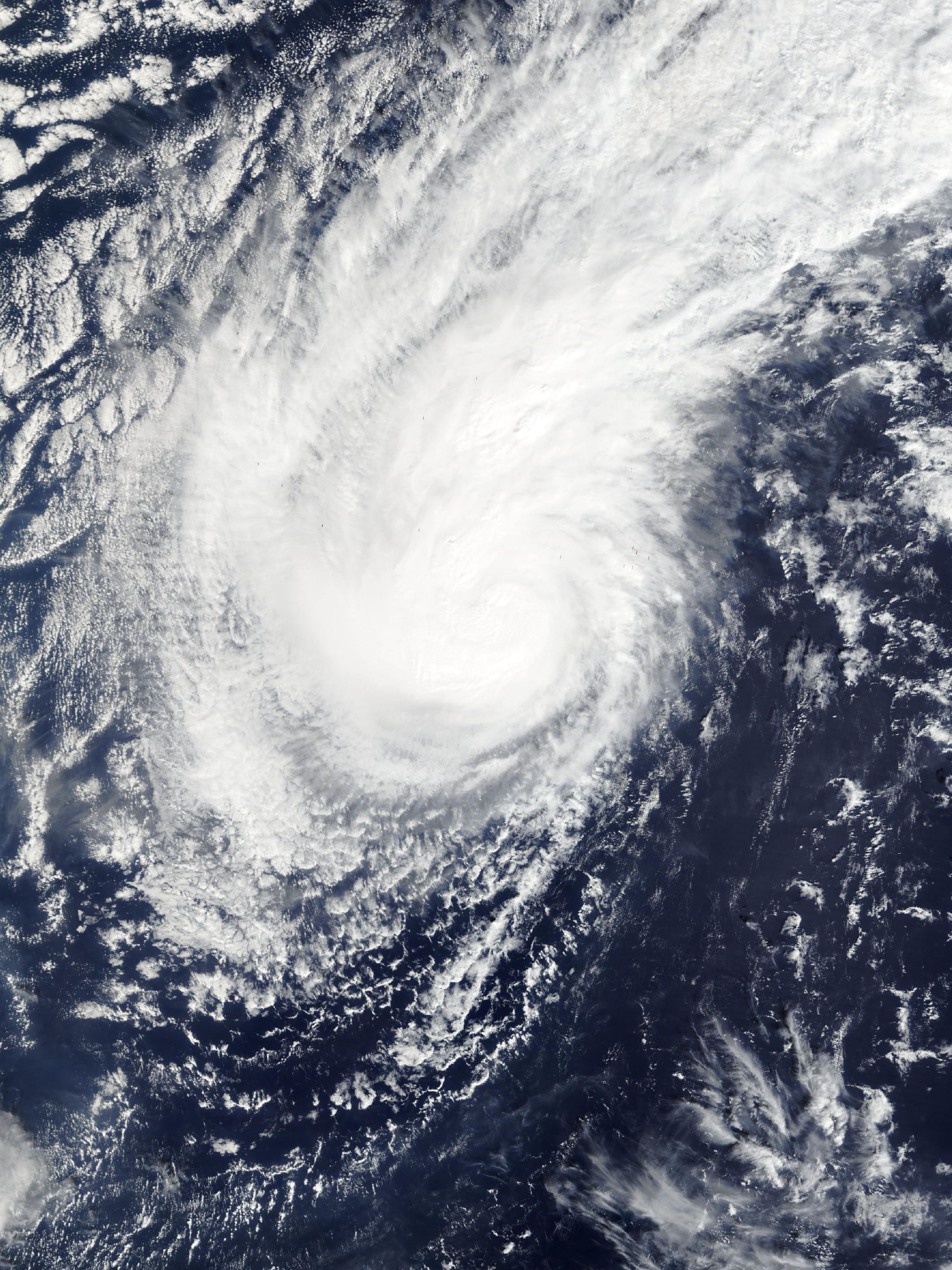
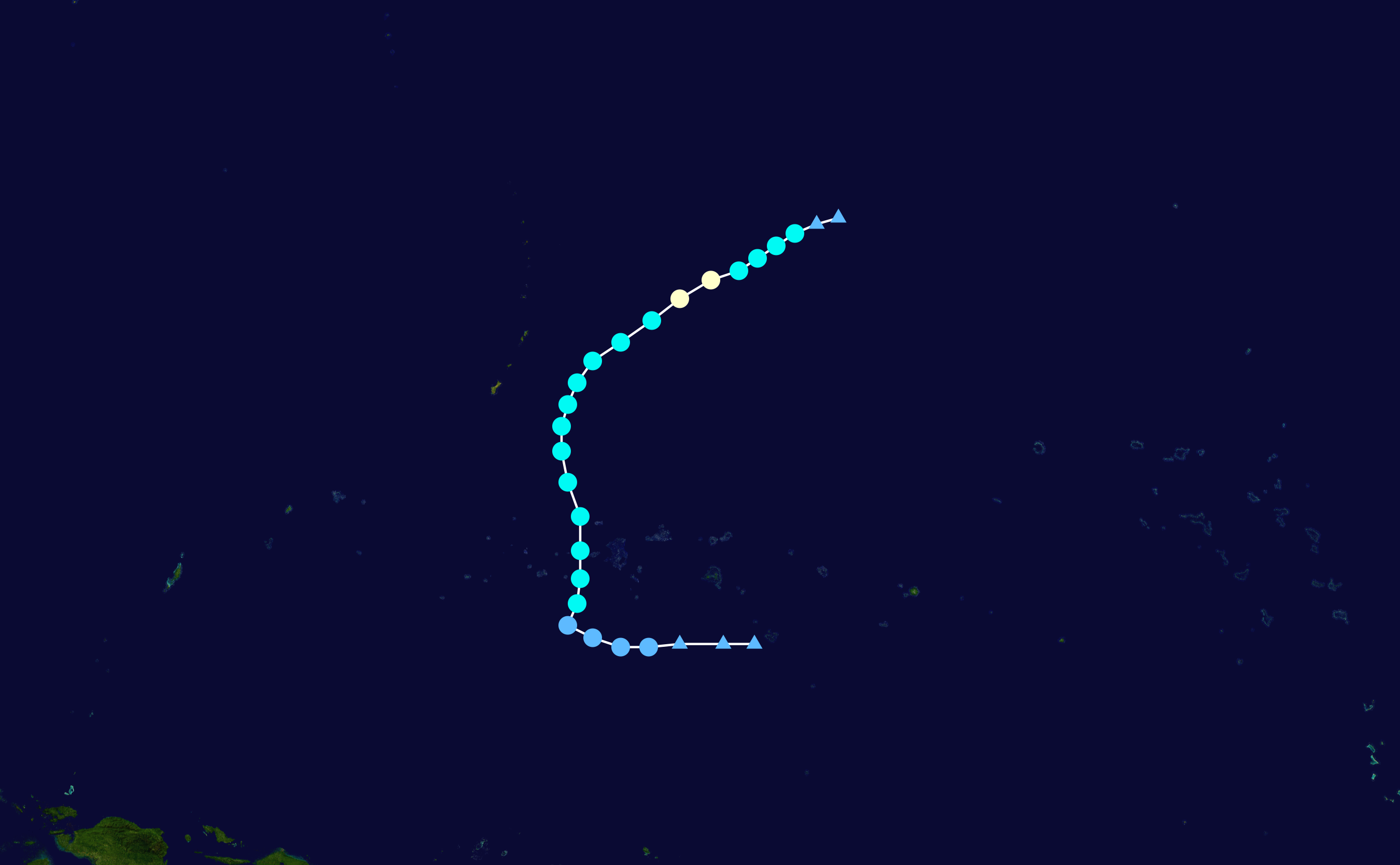
- Duration: January 13 – January 19
- Peak intensity: 95 km/h (60 mph) (10-min); 985 hPa (mbar)

On January 12, a tropical disturbance developed within an area of light vertical wind shear. This allowed deep convection to develop over a broad low-level circulation. The next day, the Joint Typhoon Warning Center (JTWC) issued a Tropical Cyclone Formation Alert (TCFA) as the system continued to develop. Later that day, they issued their first advisory on Tropical Depression 01W while the storm was located about 215 km (134 mi) southwest of Chuuk. Several hours later, the Japan Meteorological Agency (JMA) also designated the system as a tropical depression. Early on January 15, the JTWC upgraded 01W to a tropical storm as the system turned towards the north. The northward movement was the result of the system traveling along the edge of a low to mid-level ridge located to the east. About 12 hours later, the JMA upgraded the depression to a tropical storm and gave it the name Kulap; which was contributed by Thailand and is the Thai word for rose. Kulap gradually intensified over the next two days, reaching its peak intensity with winds of 95 km/h (59 mph) 10-minute winds) around 1800 UTC on January 17, making it a severe tropical storm according to the JMA. However, at the same time the JMA assessed Kulap to have reached its peak intensity, the JTWC classified it as a minimal typhoon with winds of 120 km/h (75 mph) 1-minute winds). Shortly after reaching its peak intensity, the storm began to undergo an extratropical transition and weaken. Late on January 18, the JTWC issued their final advisory on Kulap despite the storm remaining tropical. The JMA considered Kulap to have been a tropical storm until early the next day. The storm dissipated as a weak extratropical system around 1200 UTC on January 19. Between January 13 and 14, the storm produced heavy rains over the island of Chuuk. Upwards of 300 mm (12 in) of rain fell during the two-day span, of which 166.6 millimetres (6.56 in) fell in 24 hours.

=== Severe Tropical Storm Roke (Auring) ===
- Severe tropical storm (JMA)
- Category 1 typhoon (SSHWS)
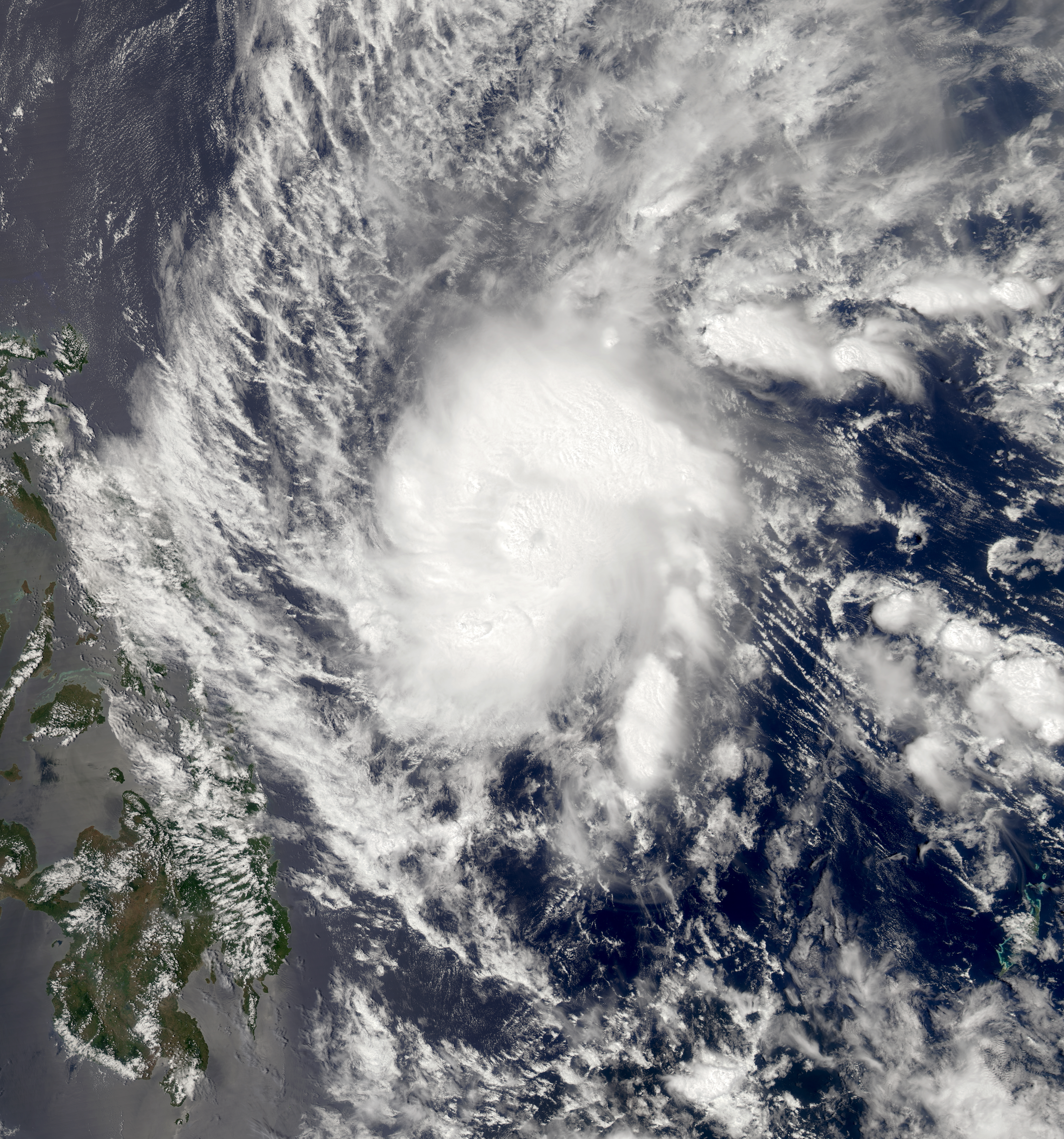
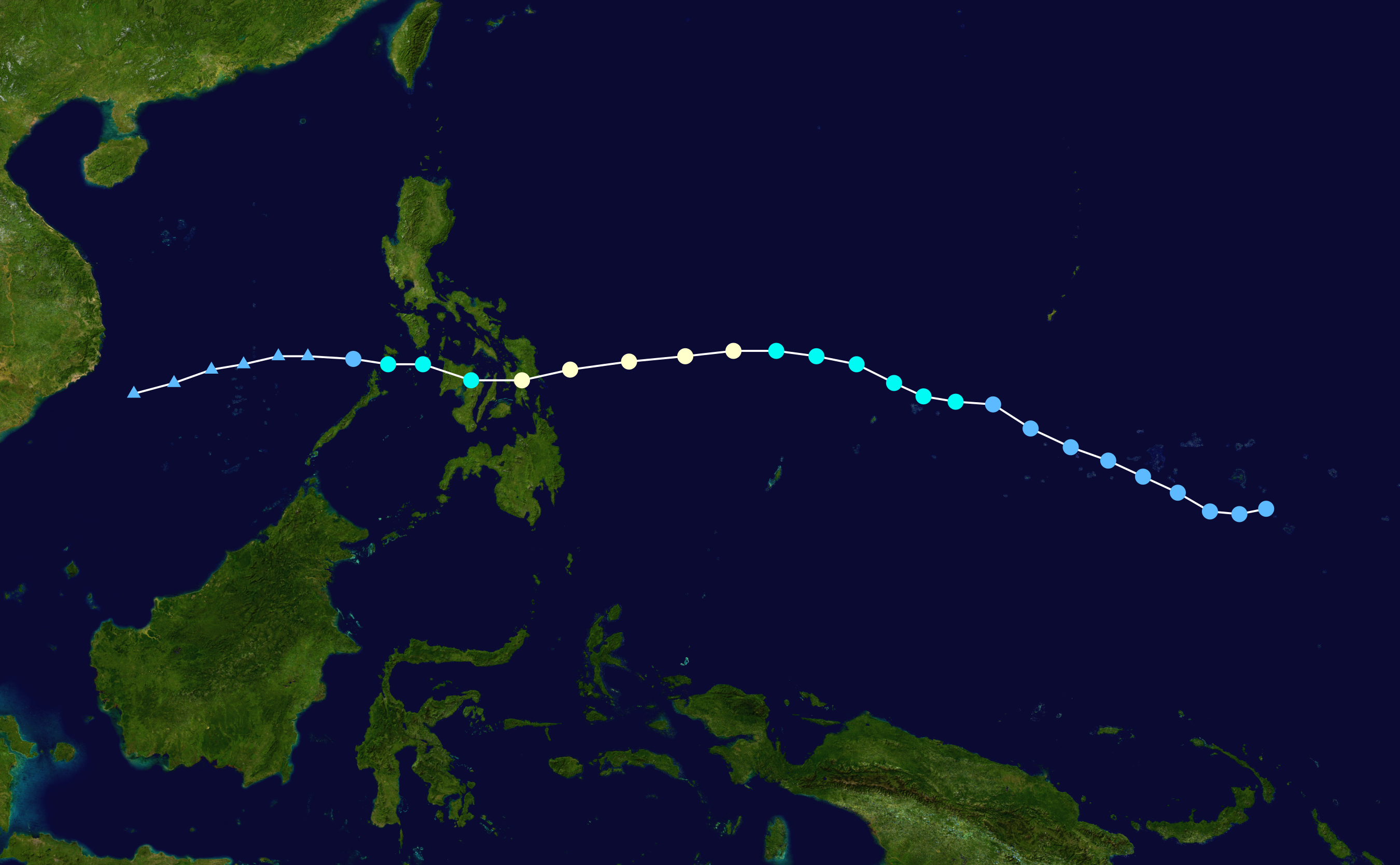
- Duration: March 12 – March 19
- Peak intensity: 100 km/h (65 mph) (10-min); 980 hPa (mbar)

A tropical disturbance formed on March 11, near the equator. It rapidly developed into Tropical Depression 02W on March 13 as it steadily moved north, then west towards the Philippines. Later that day, it entered warm waters as it was upgraded into Tropical Storm Roke. Due to a strong ridge of high pressure north of it, it moved west-southwest, attaining peak intensity as a severe tropical storm. Roke then entered the PAR, giving the name Auring later that day. It made landfall in eastern Visayas on March 16. The next day, Roke rapidly weakened due to cool waters and dissipated on March 18. Roke is a male Chamorro name. Seven people were killed and damages amounted to $166,000 (2005 USD).

=== Typhoon Sonca (Bising) ===
- Very strong typhoon (JMA)
- Category 4 typhoon (SSHWS)
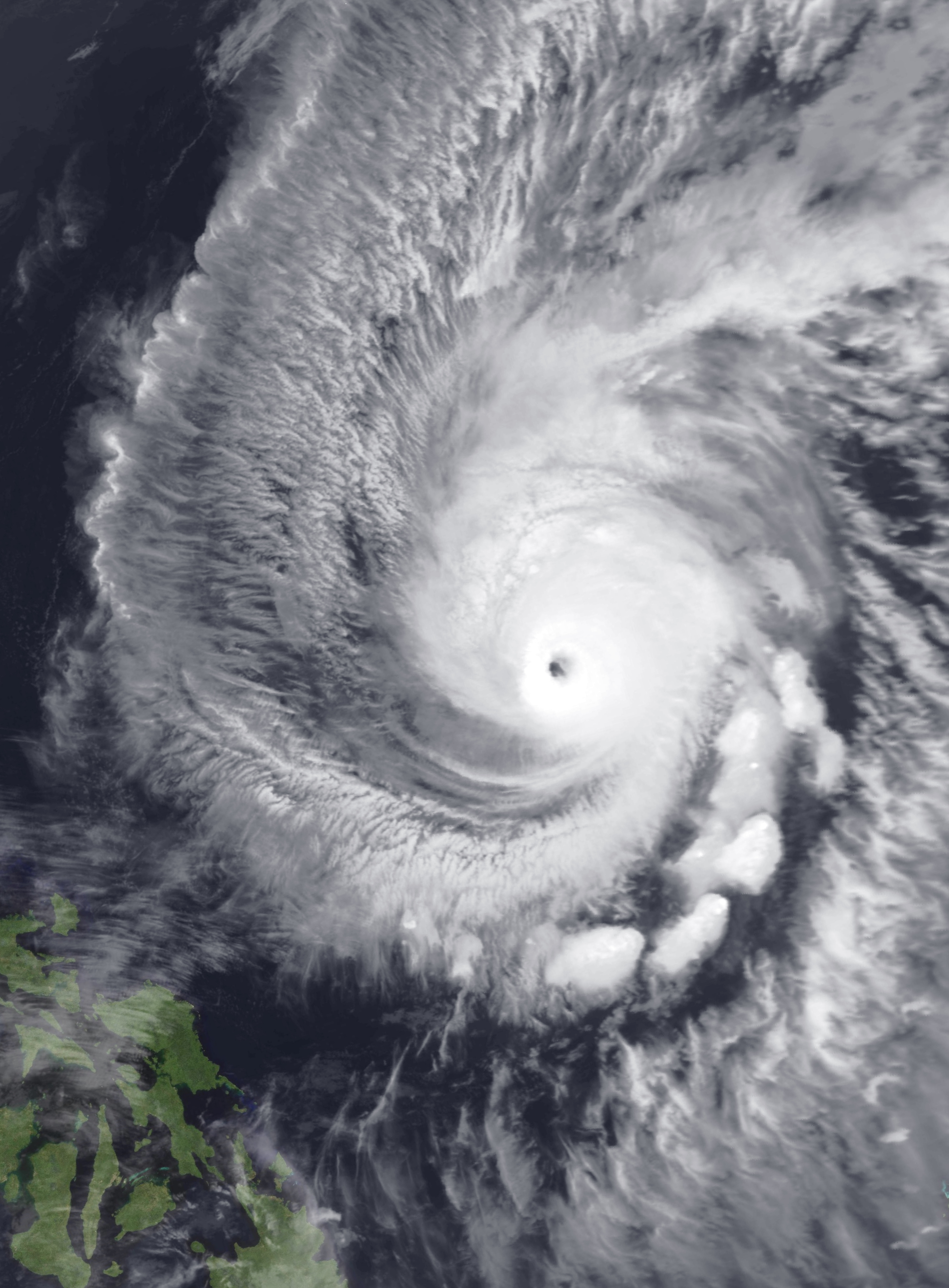
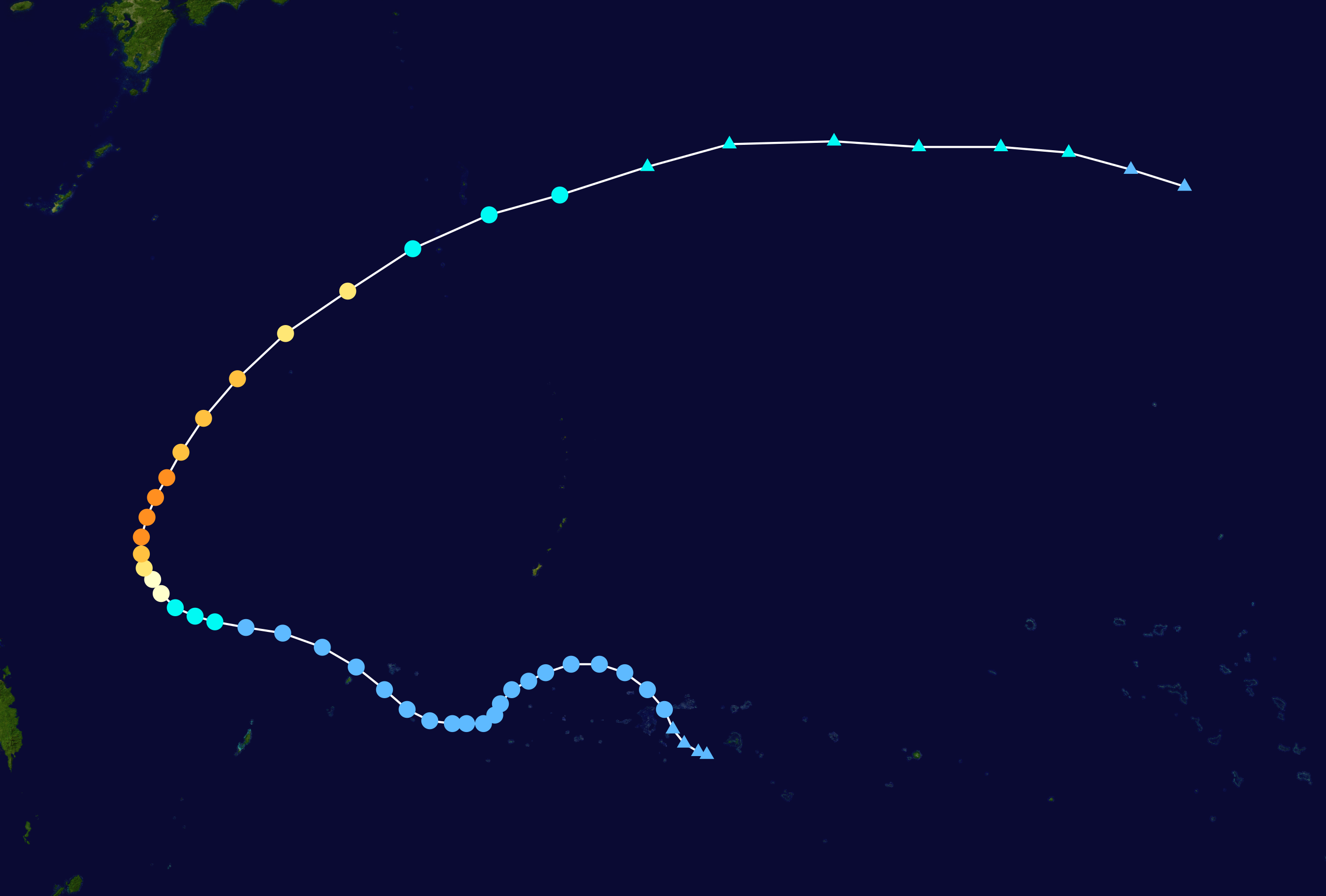
- Duration: April 16 – April 27
- Peak intensity: 165 km/h (105 mph) (10-min); 935 hPa (mbar)

A large area of convection formed on April 11. Late on April 14, a newly disorganized disturbance formed in that area and steadily intensified. The next two days, the disturbance interacted with another low-pressure area as it moved north towards warm waters. On April 17, the depression weakened due to strong vertical windshear. The JTWC designated as Tropical Depression 03W on April 18. Although the JMA started classifying it as a tropical depression on April 21. It rapidly intensified into a tropical storm, with the JMA naming it Sonca late on April 20. Very early on April 21, the PAGASA classified it as a storm, naming it Bising. Convection built up the storm again on April 22 and entered an area with favorable conditions. The next day, Sonca rapidly intensified into a Category 4 typhoon until it reached peak intensity on mid-April 24. Sonca rapidly weakened due to cool waters and dissipated on April 27.

=== Typhoon Nesat (Dante) ===
- Very strong typhoon (JMA)
- Category 4 typhoon (SSHWS)
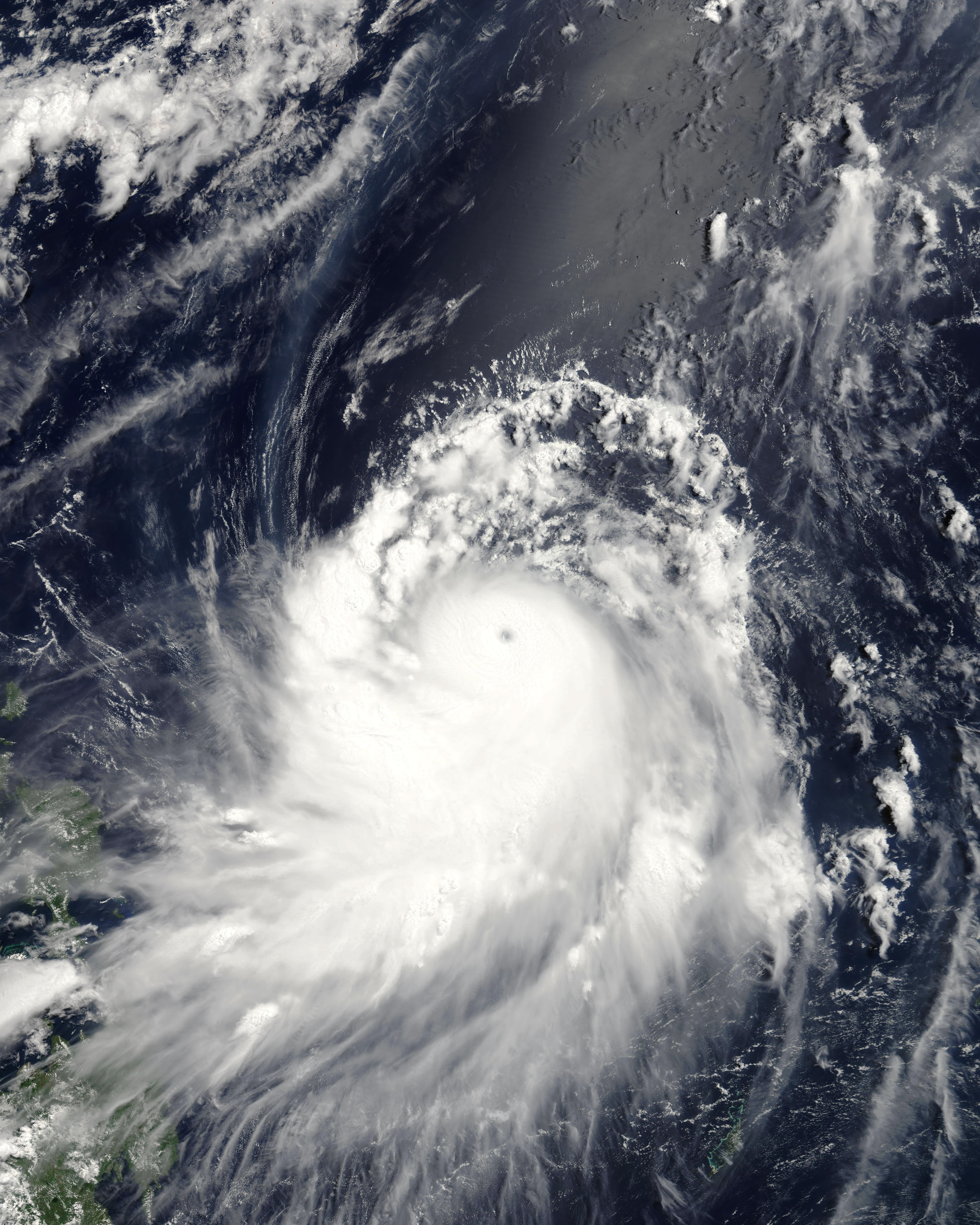
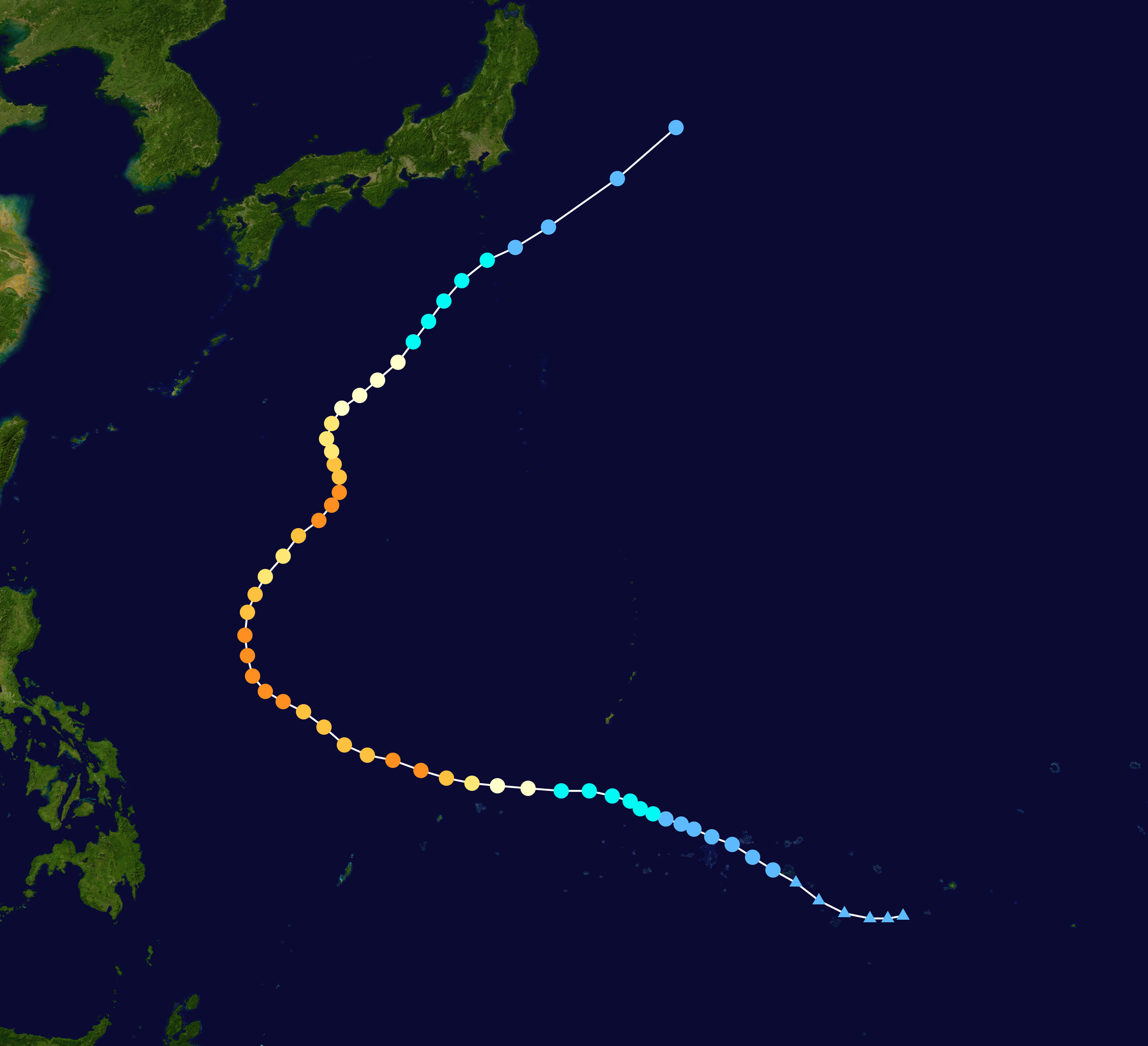
- Duration: May 27 – June 11
- Peak intensity: 175 km/h (110 mph) (10-min); 930 hPa (mbar)

A tropical depression formed from a tropical wave late on May 28. It rapidly intensified into Tropical Storm Nesat on May 30, rapidly moving west. This was a powerful storm that formed on May 30 about 290 nautical miles (540 kilometres) south-southeast of Guam as Tropical Depression 04W. It was quickly upgraded to Tropical Storm Nesat overnight at 1800 UTC (0200 PHT May 31). Nesat is a Cambodian word for fisherman. On the evening of June 1, it strengthened into Typhoon Nesat. On June 2, it entered the Philippine area of responsibility and was assigned the name Dante for Philippine warnings. Typhoon Nesat (Dante) quickly grew to a Category 4 storm as it approached the Philippines, but it curved away to the northeast and did not pose a threat to land. Waxing and waning in strength it eventually became extratropical southeast of Honshū, Japan at tropical storm strength on the morning of June 10 at 0000 UTC (0900 JST).

=== Typhoon Haitang (Feria) ===
- Violent typhoon (JMA)
- Category 5 super typhoon (SSHWS)
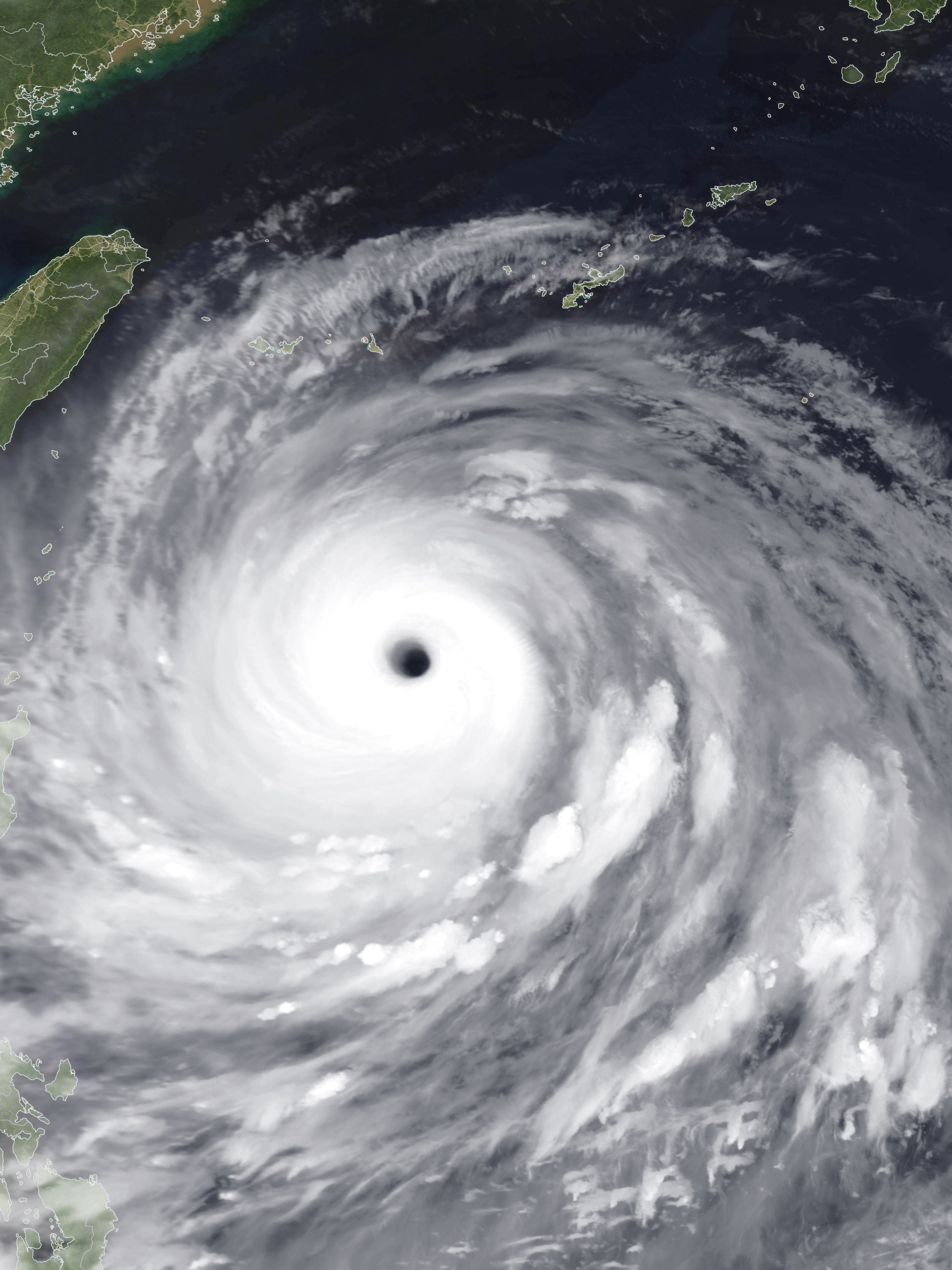
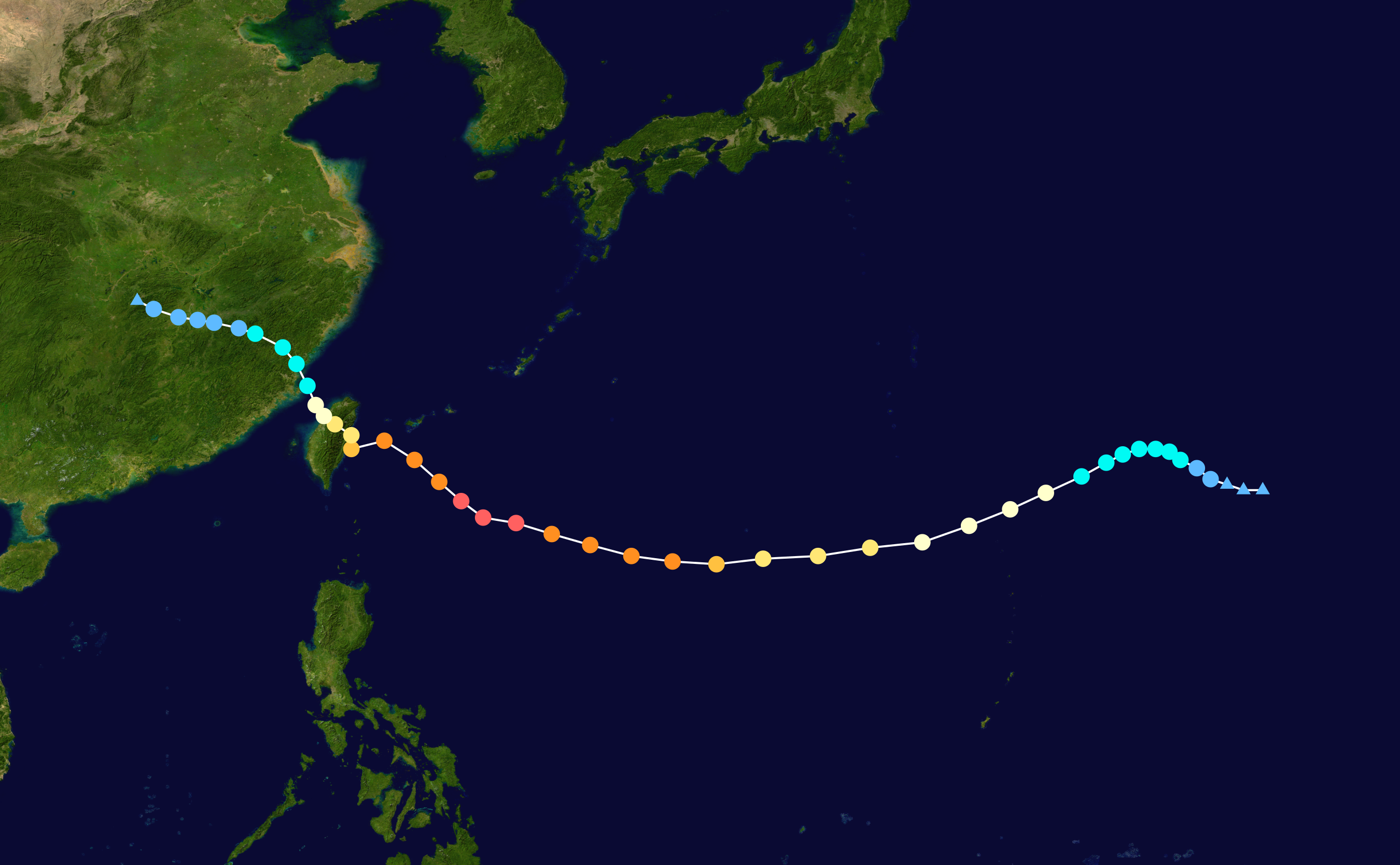
- Duration: July 10 – July 21
- Peak intensity: 195 km/h (120 mph) (10-min); 920 hPa (mbar)

An upper-level low associated with an easterly wave occurred late on July 7. It became a tropical depression on the evening of July 11 as a poorly organized depression about 110 nautical miles (200 kilometres) west of Marcus Island, Japan at 1200 UTC (2000 JST). By 1800 UTC (0300 JST July 13), it had reached tropical storm strength and was named Haitang, a Chinese name for flowering crabapple. It grew to typhoon strength at 1800 UTC (0300 JST July 14) the following day. As it moved westward it continued to gain in strength, reaching Category three status as it entered the Philippine area of responsibility. PAGASA named the storm Feria for Philippine warnings on July 15. By July 16, the storm continued tracking west and became a threat to Taiwan and Japan's Sakishima Islands. Haitang strengthened into a Category 5 super typhoon. On July 17 it weakened to a Category 3 as it continued west, sparing Sakishima a direct hit but aiming directly for Taiwan. Typhoon Haitang made landfall near Hualien, Taiwan at 0000 UTC (0800 HKT) on the morning of July 18. Taking a full day to cross the island and over the interior mountains, it caused flash floods and landslides killing four people. Weakening to a tropical storm as it entered the South China Sea, it reorganized into a minimal typhoon as it approached the southeast China coast. Haitang made landfall for the second time near Wenzhou China on July 19 at 1200 UTC (2000 HKT). Moving inland, it rapidly lost its strength and dissipated. PAGASA stopped issuing advisories for the storm near Jiangxi on July 20.

There were 15 deaths in Taiwan and another 14 in mainland China.

=== Tropical Storm Nalgae ===
- Tropical storm (JMA)
- Tropical storm (SSHWS)
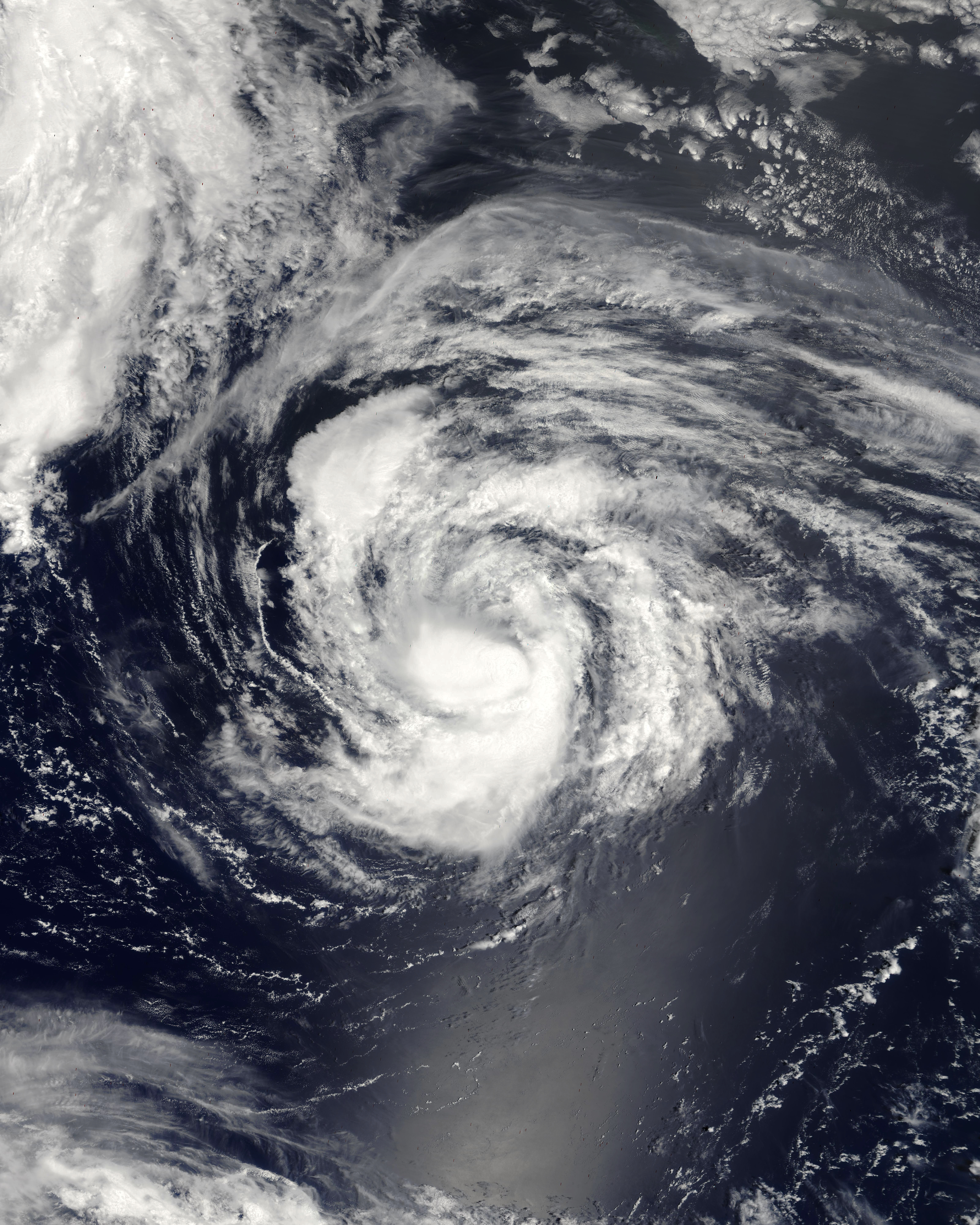
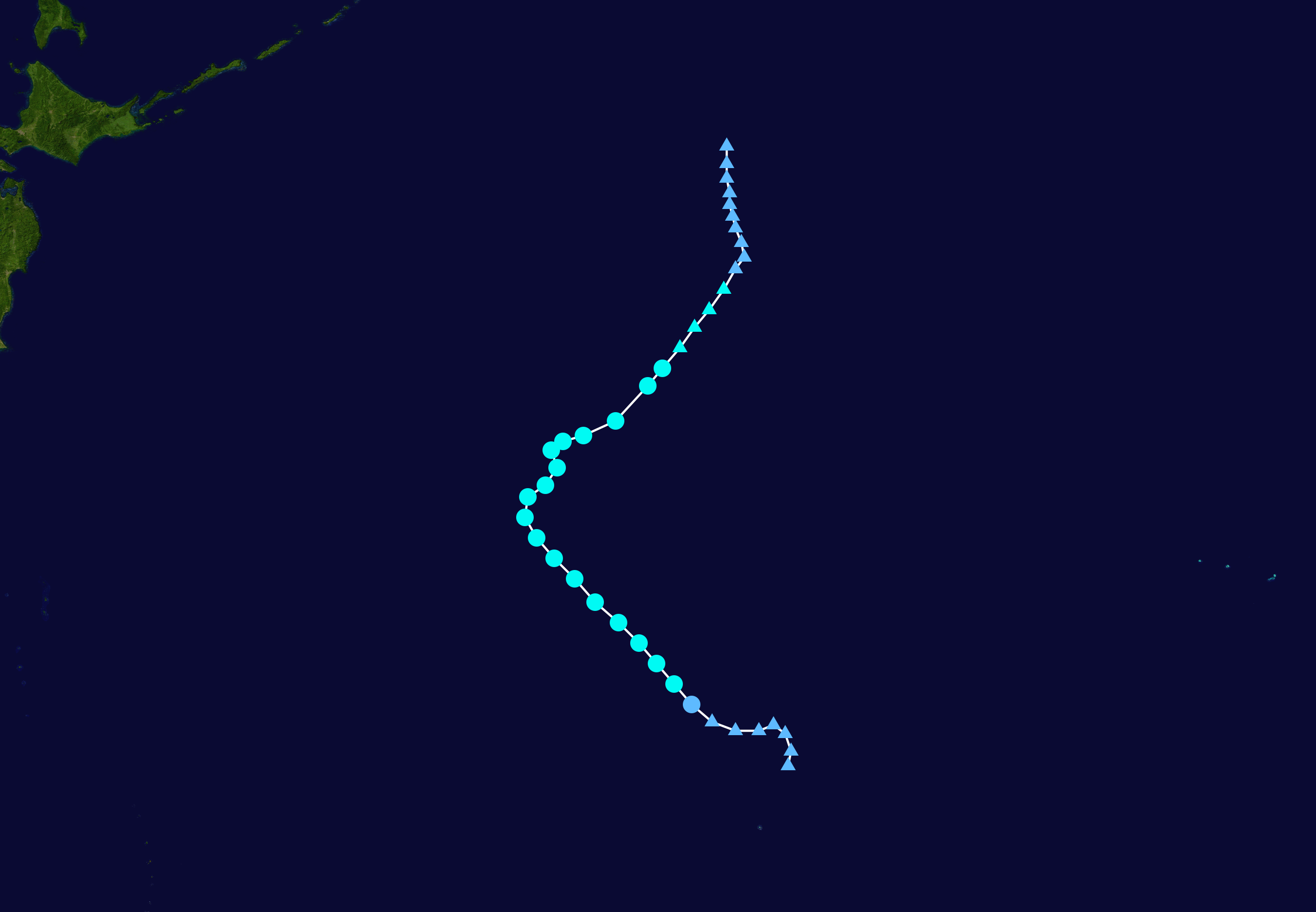
- Duration: July 18 – July 24
- Peak intensity: 85 km/h (50 mph) (10-min); 990 hPa (mbar)

An upper-level low formed on July 17 near warm waters. It steadily intensified, moving north on July 20, with both JMA and JTWC upgrading it as Tropical Storm Nalgae. Later that day, it passed by an area of convection and cluster of thunderstorms, reaching peak intensity on July 21. It maintained its intensity until the afternoon hours of July 22, but the JMA classified it as a severe tropical storm. Nalgae rapidly weakened as it was downgraded into a depression on July 23 by both agencies. The JTWC made its final warnings on the morning of July 24 as it became extratropical. The remnants of Nalgae was absorbed by a large extratropical system from Tropical Storm Banyan on July 28. In post-analysis, the JMA downgraded it to a Tropical Storm.

Tropical Storm Nalgae formed from a tropical disturbance 325 nautical miles (602 kilometres) northwest of Wake Island on the morning of July 20. Nalgae is a Korean word for wing. Nalgae did not reach typhoon intensity or threaten land. It turned to the north and then east, avoiding Japan.

=== Severe Tropical Storm Banyan ===
- Severe tropical storm (JMA)
- Tropical storm (SSHWS)
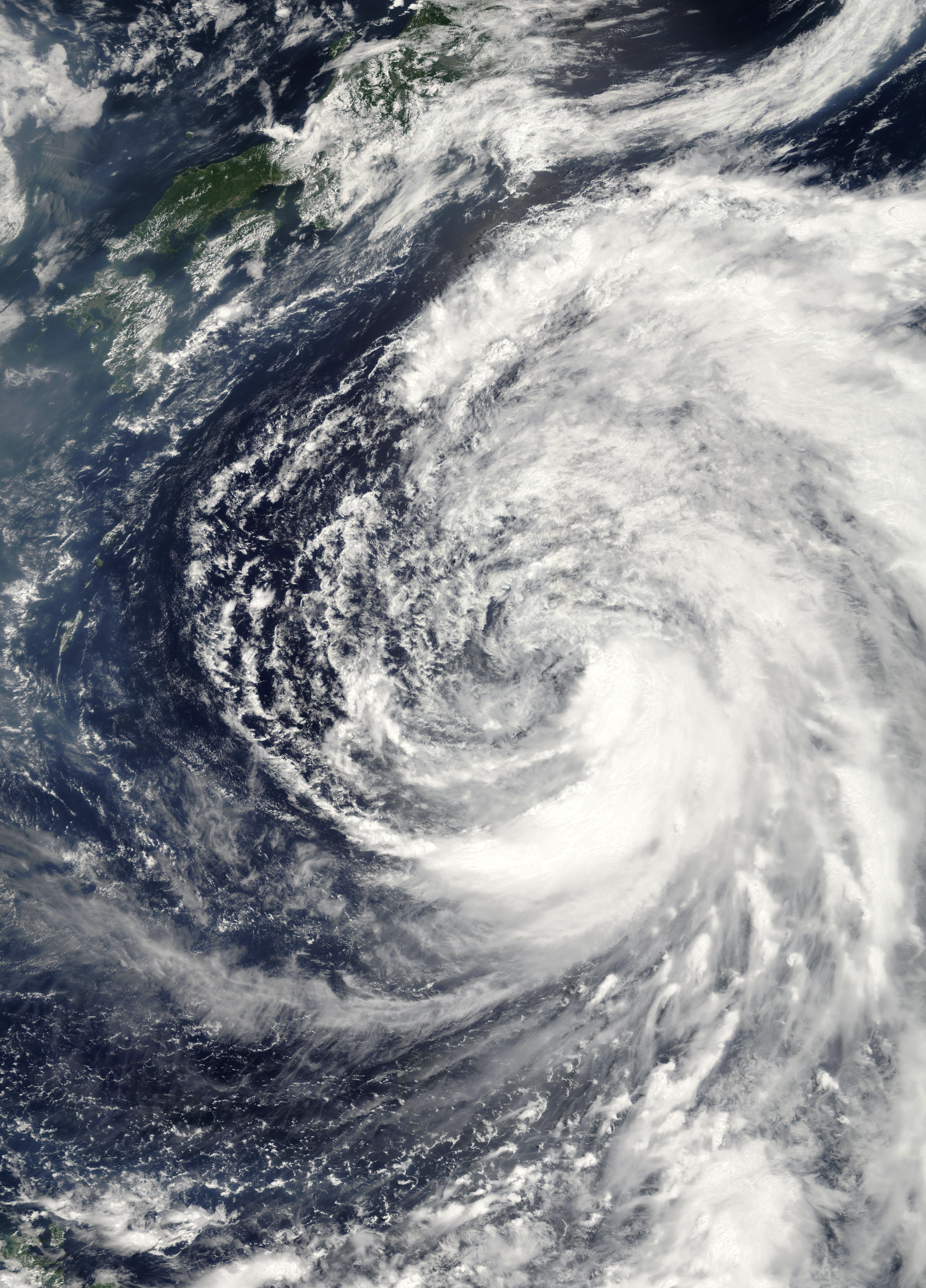
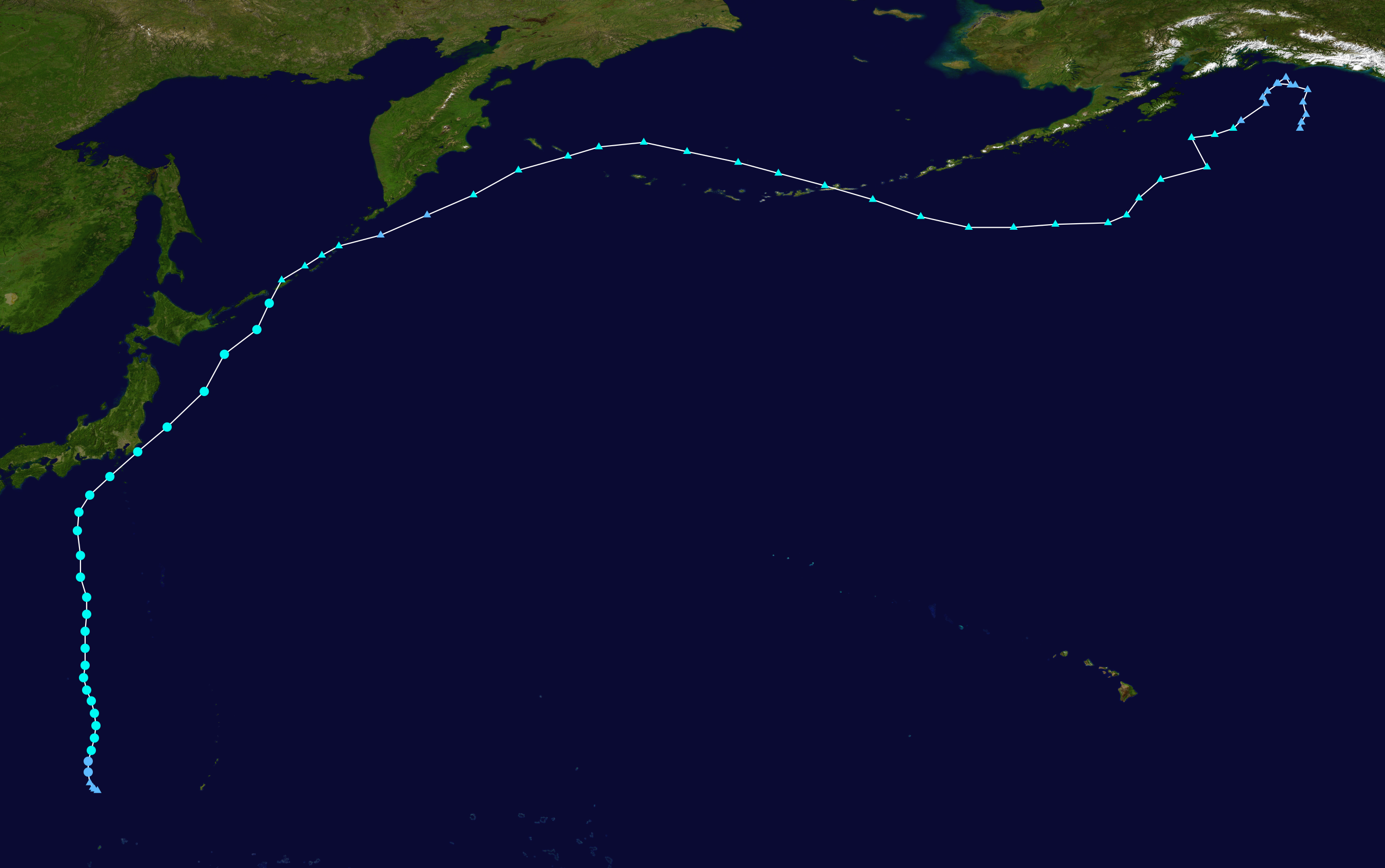
- Duration: July 20 – July 27
- Peak intensity: 100 km/h (65 mph) (10-min); 975 hPa (mbar)

A large tropical disturbance formed late on July 19, which formed in area of high convection and from the outflow of Typhoon Haitang. It rapidly intensified into a strong depression on July 21. While tracking northwards, it was named and upgraded as Tropical Storm Banyan later on July 22. Late on July 23, Banyan reached peak intensity of a severe tropical storm by the JMA until the sunset hours of July 24. Banyan rapidly weakened as it affected Japan by bringing heavy rainfall from July 25 to 28. It made landfall on July 26 and became a large extratropical system on July 27, which made the JTWC issued Banyan's final warning very early on that day. The system absorbed the extratropical remnants of Nalgae the next day and fully dissipated on July 31, affecting Alaska and Canada.

Severe Tropical Storm Banyan formed from a tropical disturbance about 300 nautical miles (560 kilometres) north of Yap Island on the evening of July 21 at 1200 UTC (2100 JST). Banyan is a tree common in India and southern China. Banyan brushed the southern and eastern coasts of Honshū, Japan on July 26. It became extratropical off the northeastern coast of Honshū on July 27.

=== Tropical Storm Washi ===
- Tropical storm (JMA)
- Tropical storm (SSHWS)
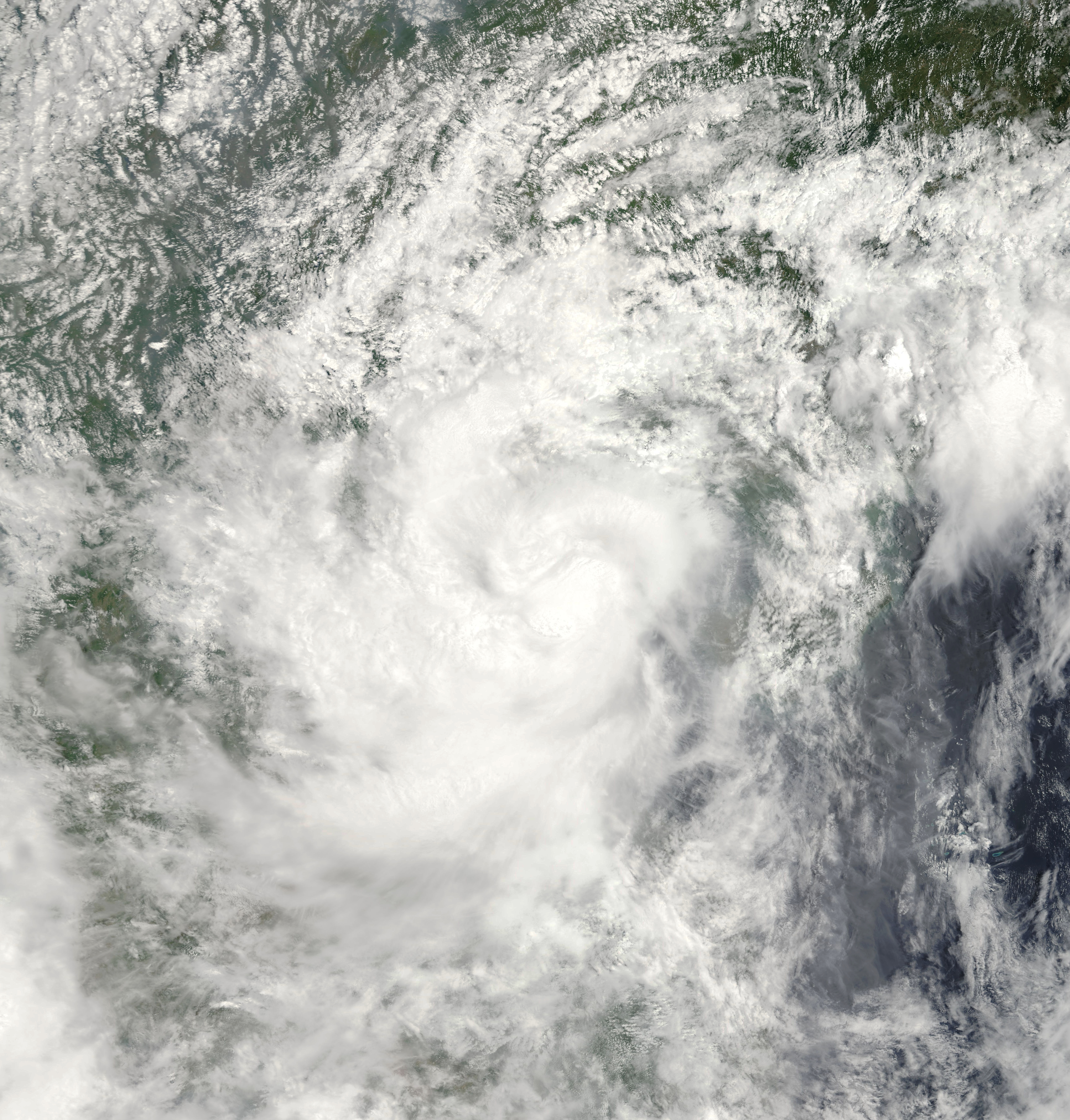
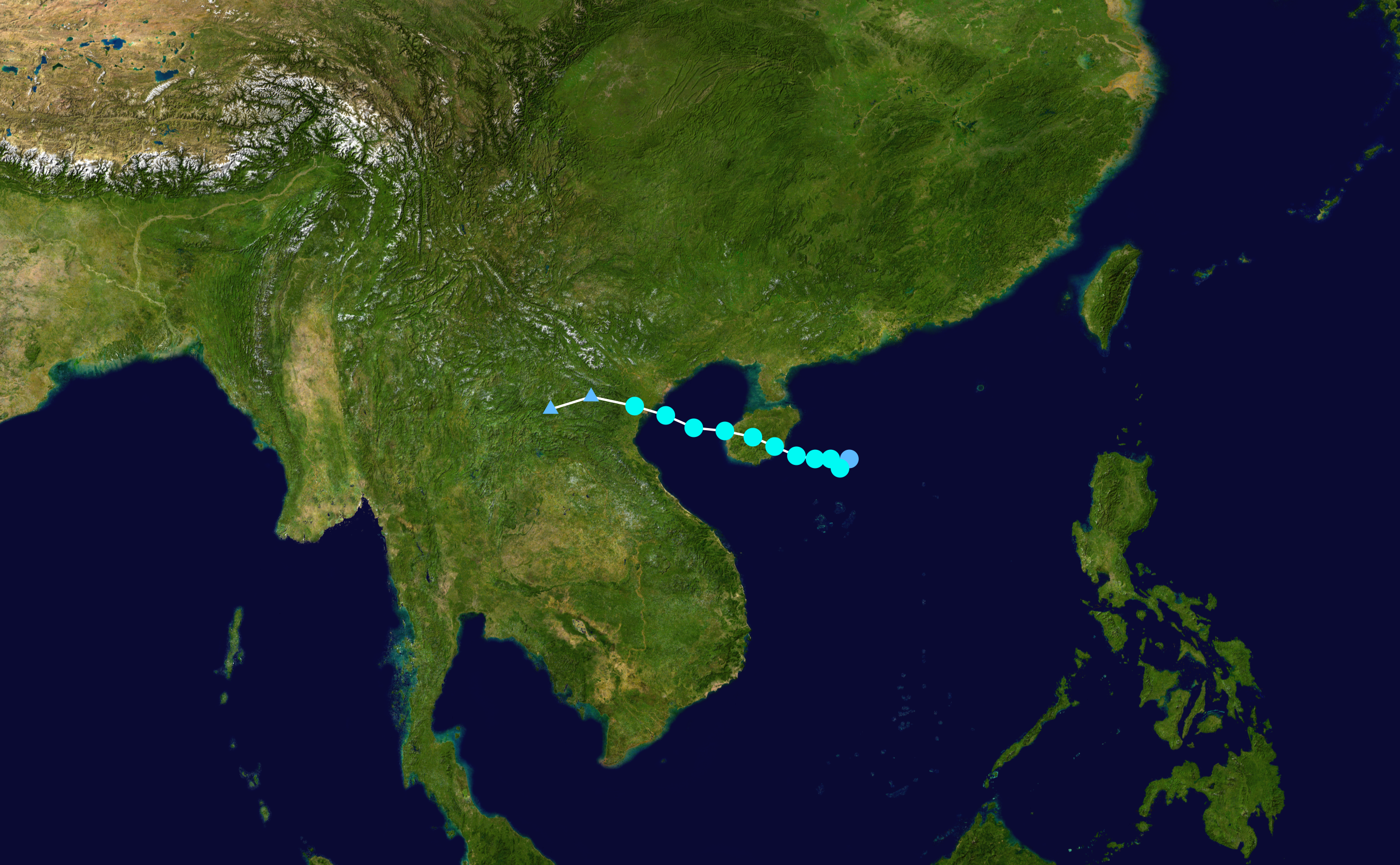
- Duration: July 28 – July 31
- Peak intensity: 85 km/h (50 mph) (10-min); 985 hPa (mbar)

A cluster of thunderstorms was pulled from the very strong outflow from Tropical Storm Banyan east of Manila, Philippines on July 26. The next day, it was classified into a tropical disturbance which was moving northwest towards Hong Kong. On July 28, it became a tropical depression and then a tropical storm the next day, with the JMA naming it as Washi. Later that day, it reached peak intensity and rapidly weakened due to an exposed circulation on July 31. Washi finally dissipated later that day, with its remnants energy moving west dissipating on August 2.

Tropical Storm Washi formed as a tropical depression about 215 nautical miles (398 kilometres) south of Hong Kong. Washi is a Japanese word for the constellation Aquila and it literally means "Japanese paper" The storm moved west towards Hainan. Tropical Storm Washi made its first landfall near Xinglong, Hainan. After re-entering the Gulf of Tonkin, the storm made its final landfall near Nam Định, Vietnam.

=== Typhoon Matsa (Gorio) ===
- Typhoon (JMA)
- Category 2 typhoon (SSHWS)
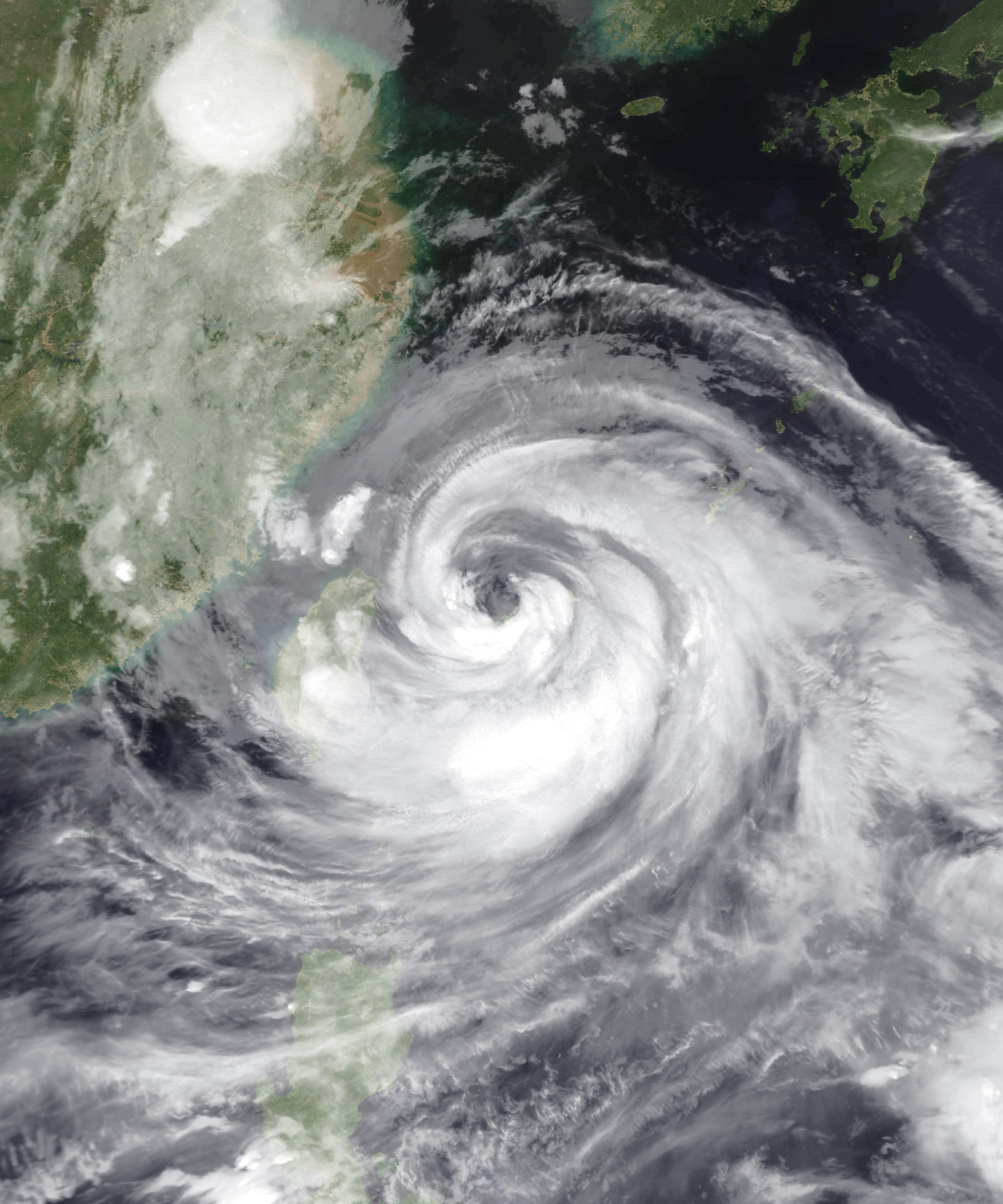
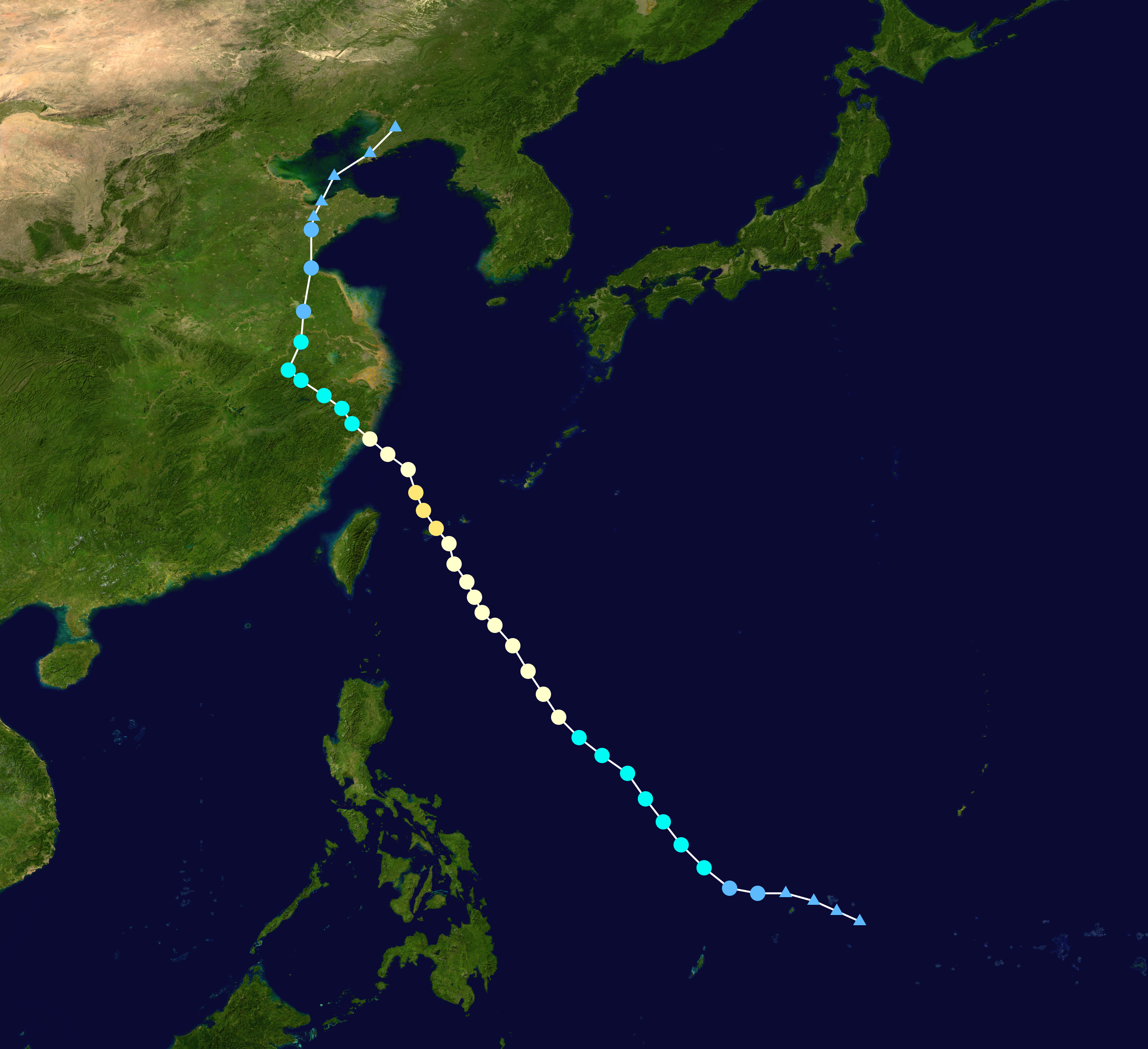
- Duration: July 29 – August 8
- Peak intensity: 150 km/h (90 mph) (10-min); 950 hPa (mbar)

Typhoon Matsa (Gorio) formed as a depression 130 nautical miles (240 kilometres) west northwest of Yap Island. Matsa is a Laotian name for a lady fish. Matsa formed east of and then moved into the Philippine area of responsibility. It has been assigned the name Gorio for Philippine advisories. Matsa passed between Taiwan and Okinawa with the center of the storm passing over the Yaeyama Islands of Japan on the evening of August 4. The storm made landfall near Zhejiang, Anhui, Jiangsu and Shanghai on mainland China on the morning of August 6 with maximum sustained winds of 145 km/h (90 mph). The storm rapidly dissipated inland over China but remnants brought heavy rain inland west of Shanghai.

=== Severe Tropical Storm Sanvu (Huaning) ===
- Severe tropical storm (JMA)
- Category 1 typhoon (SSHWS)
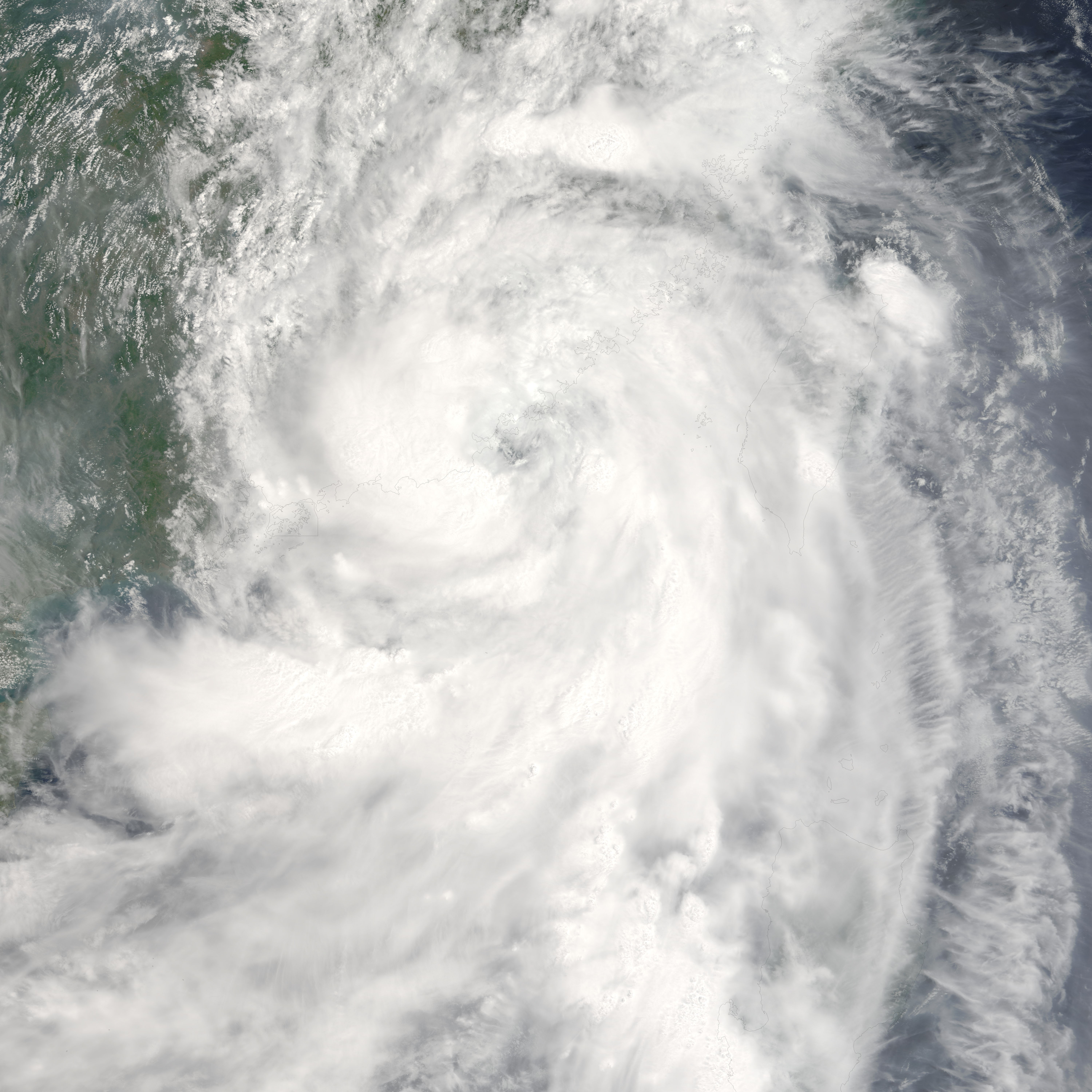
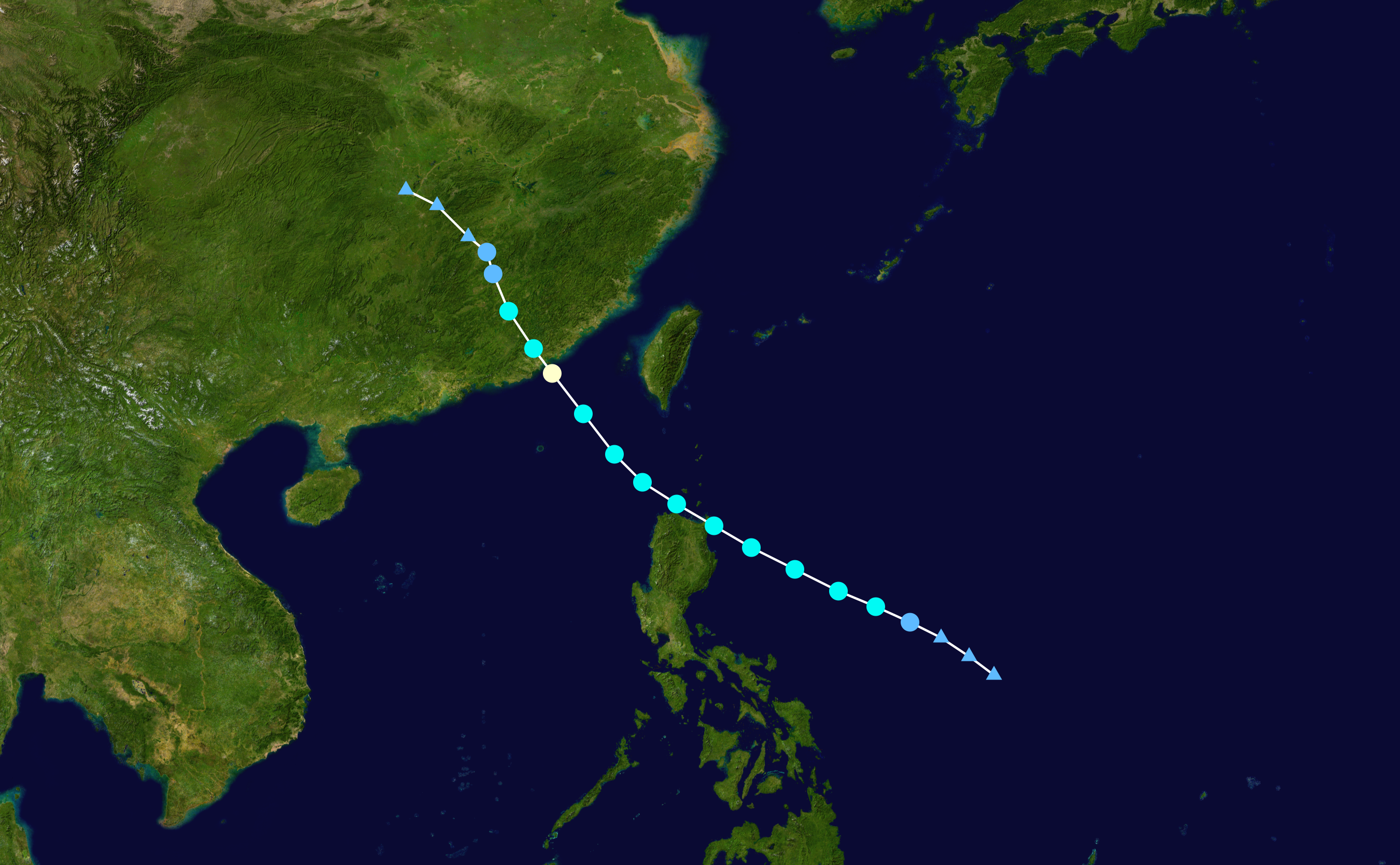
- Duration: August 9 – August 14
- Peak intensity: 95 km/h (60 mph) (10-min); 985 hPa (mbar)

Typhoon Sanvu (Huaning) formed as a tropical depression on the morning of August 10 at 0000 UTC (0800 PHT) 320 nautical miles east-northeast of Borongan on Samar Island inside the Philippine area of responsibility. PAGASA assigns names to Tropical Depressions because they often bring heavy rains and mudslides to the Philippines. Storm was named Tropical Depression Huaning for Philippine warnings but within 24 hours received the more recognized name Sanvu when it became a Tropical Storm. Sanvu is a Chinese name for coral. Tropical Storm Sanvu (Huaning) passed over a peninsula in Cagayan province on the island of Luzon early on the morning of August 12. It was upgraded to a typhoon before making landfall in China the next day on August 13. Sanvu (Huaning) rapidly dissipated after moving inland on August 14. Sanvu was the first typhoon that necessitated a tropical cyclone signal for Hong Kong.

There were 36 deaths in China.

=== Severe Tropical Storm Guchol ===
- Severe tropical storm (JMA)
- Category 1 typhoon (SSHWS)
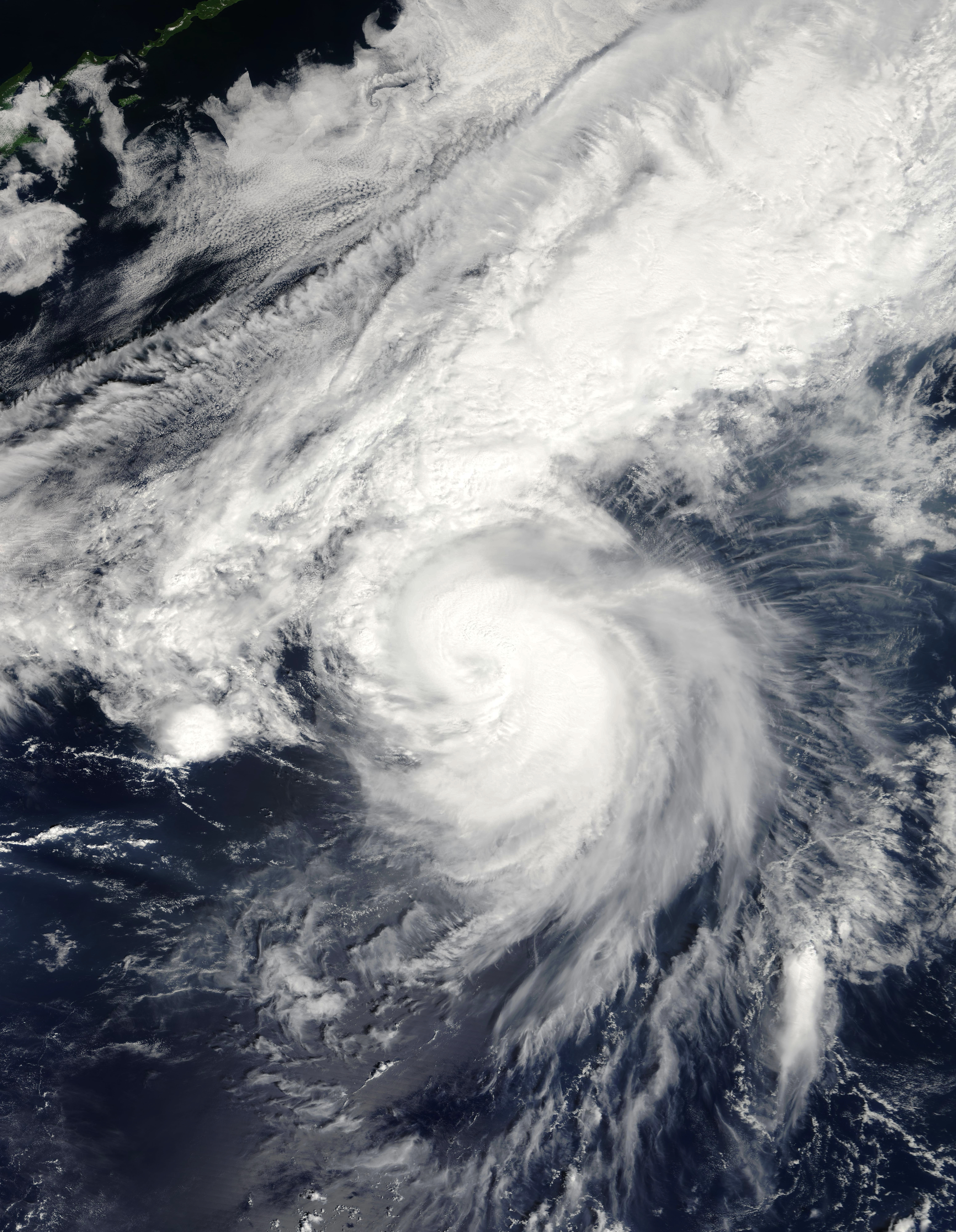
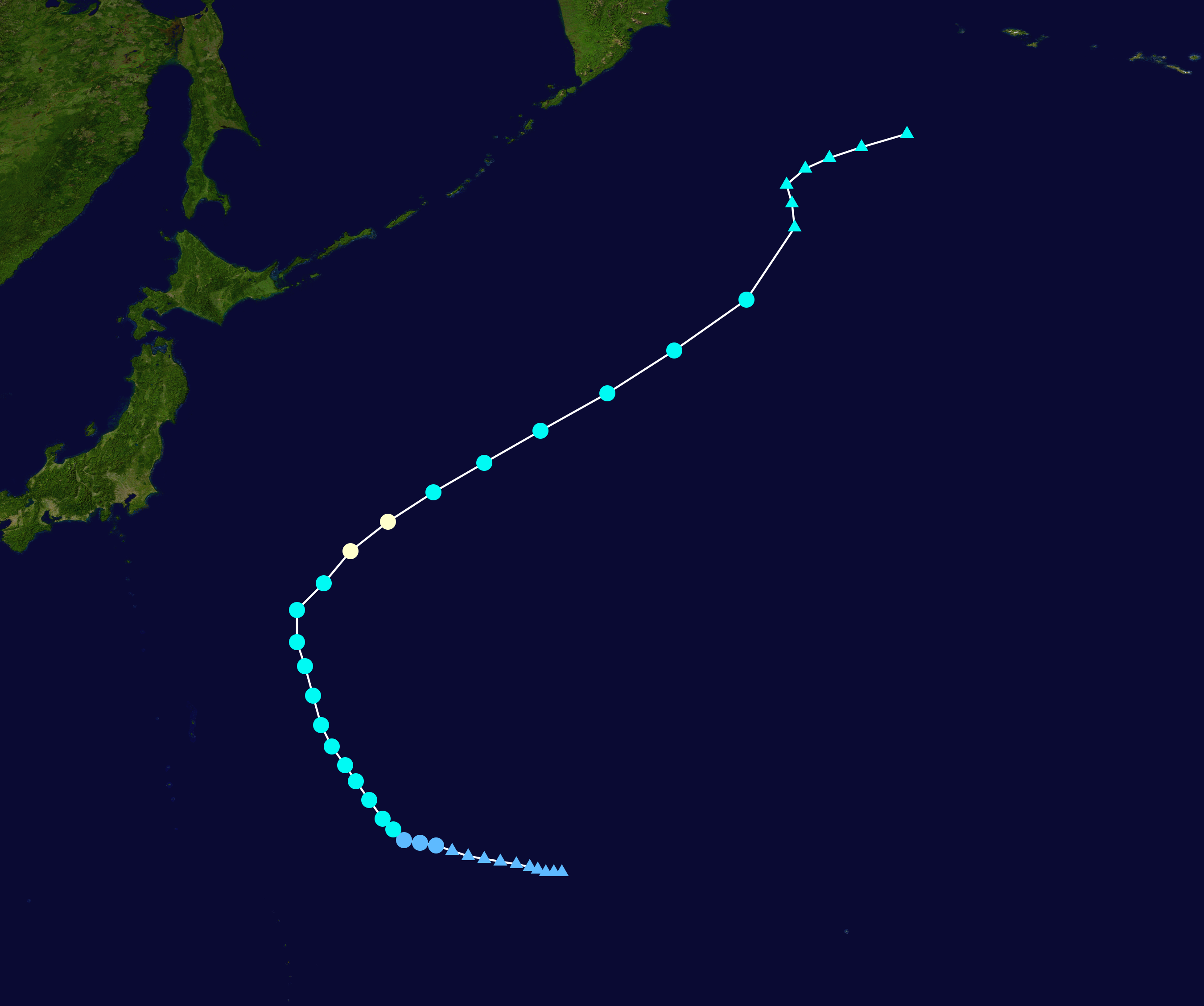
- Duration: August 17 – August 25
- Peak intensity: 100 km/h (65 mph) (10-min); 980 hPa (mbar)

Another tropical disturbance formed east of Tropical Depression 11W on August 18. In the same time where 11W became Mawar, the disturbance rapidly intensified into Tropical Depression 12W on the morning of August 20 at 0000 UTC (0900 JST) 190 nautical miles (350 kilometers) southwest of Marcus Island, Japan. It reached Tropical Storm strength the next day and was named Guchol, a Yapese name for the spice turmeric. It reached peak intensity late on August 23. Guchol curved to the northwest and never threatened land. It became extratropical August 25 at 0000 UTC (0900 JST) 735 nautical miles (1,361 kilometres) east-southeast of Nakashibetsu, Hokkaidō, Japan. The remnants of the storm dissipated and crossed the International Date Line on August 27.

=== Typhoon Mawar ===
- Very strong typhoon (JMA)
- Category 4 typhoon (SSHWS)
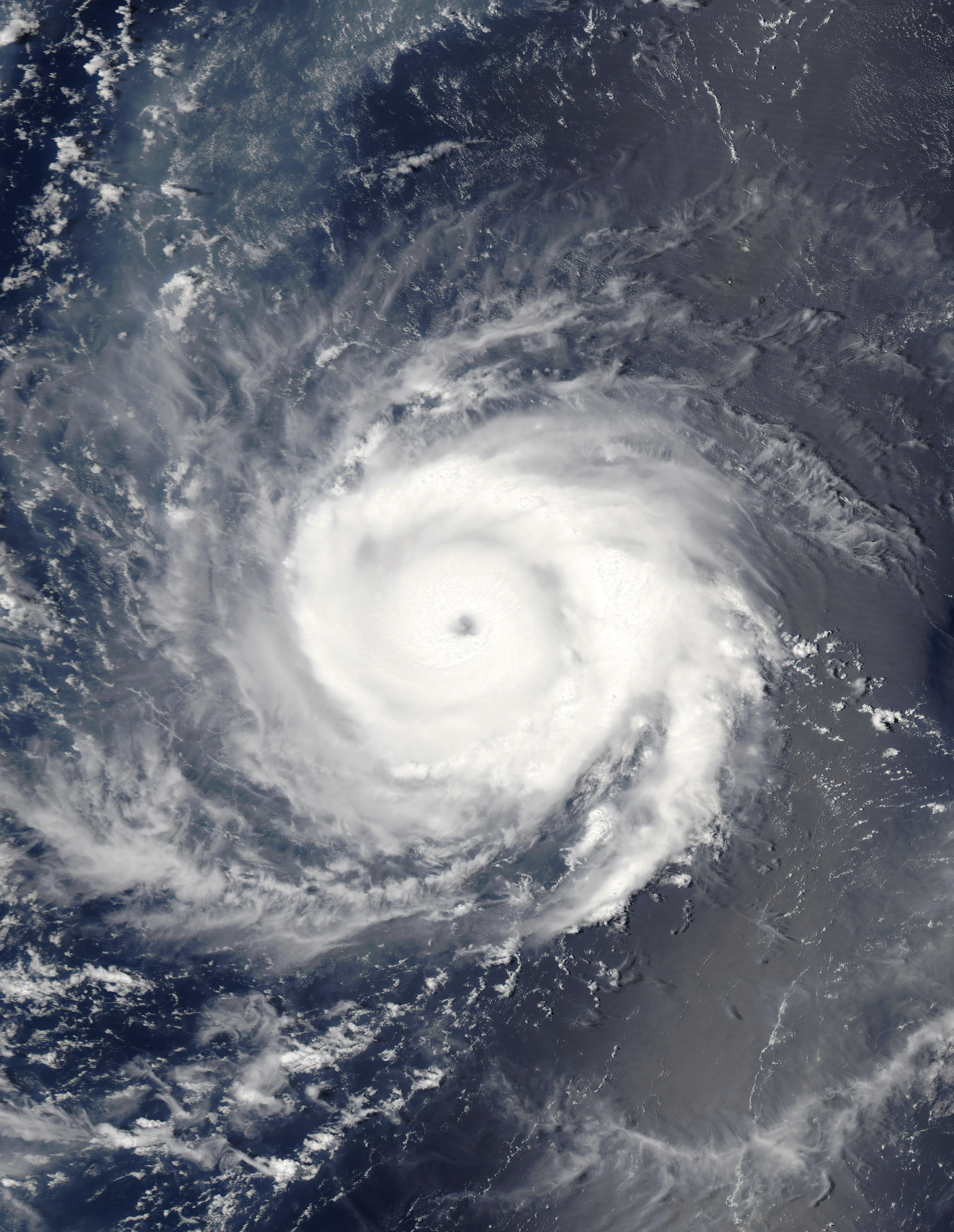
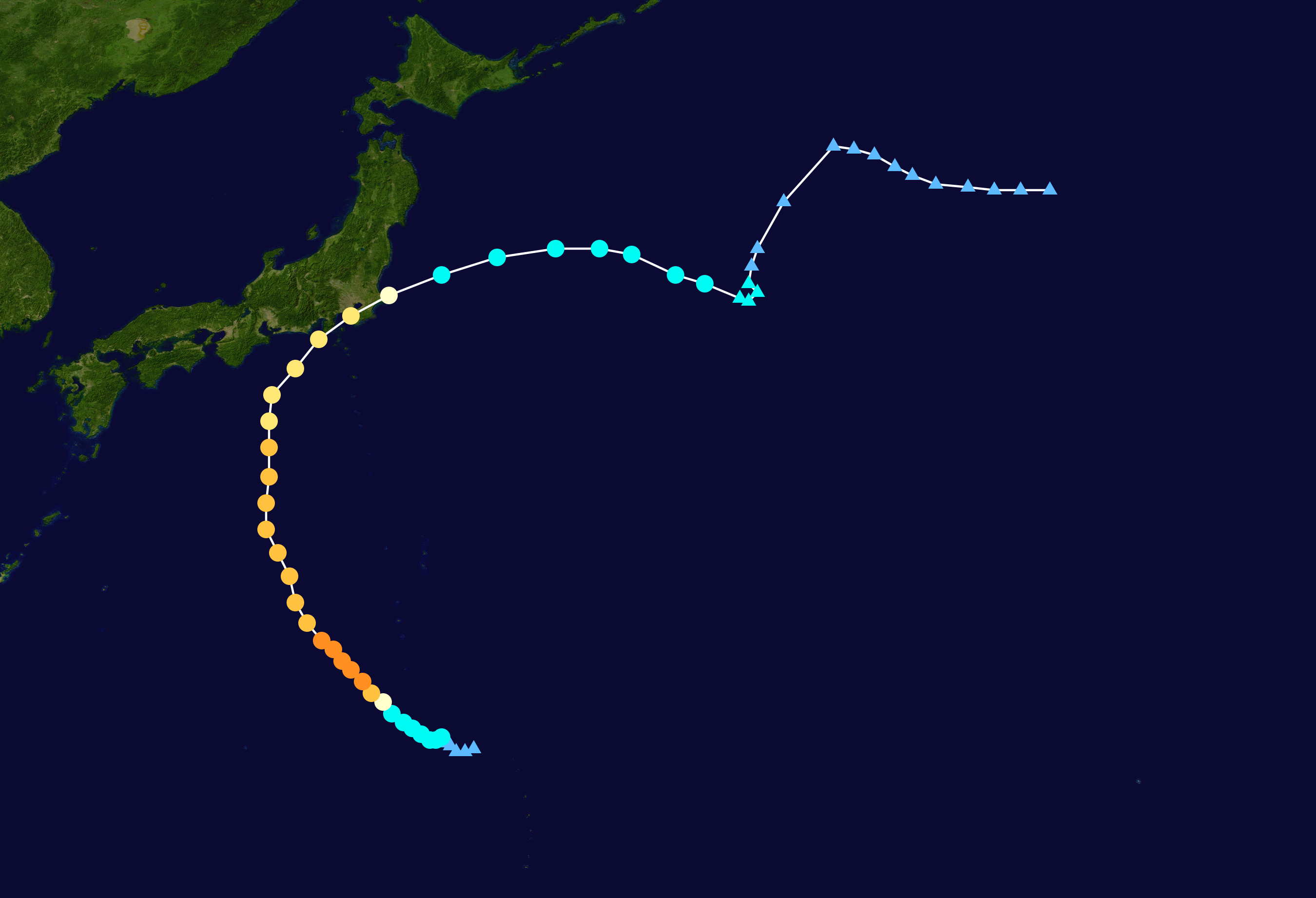
- Duration: August 17 – August 27
- Peak intensity: 175 km/h (110 mph) (10-min); 930 hPa (mbar)

A cluster of thunderstorms began to circulate into a tropical disturbance early on August 18. Its circulation became exposed and intensified again later that day. It became Tropical Depression 11W on the evening of August 19 at 1200 UTC (2100 JST) 245 nautical miles (455 kilometers) southeast of Iwo Jima. The storm intensified rapidly in two days to a Category 4 Super Typhoon but weakened as it approached Japan. Mawar made landfall on Honshū as a Category 2 Typhoon on August 25 at 1800 UTC (August 26 0300 JST) with winds of 95 mph (153 km/h). After moving inland to the northwest it was downgraded to a Category 1 typhoon before entering the Pacific Ocean. It was downgraded to a Tropical Storm on August 26 and became extratropical on August 27. The extratropical remnants of Mawar dissipated on August 30. One person was killed and seven were injured in relation to Mawar.

=== Typhoon Talim (Isang) ===
- Very strong typhoon (JMA)
- Category 4 super typhoon (SSHWS)
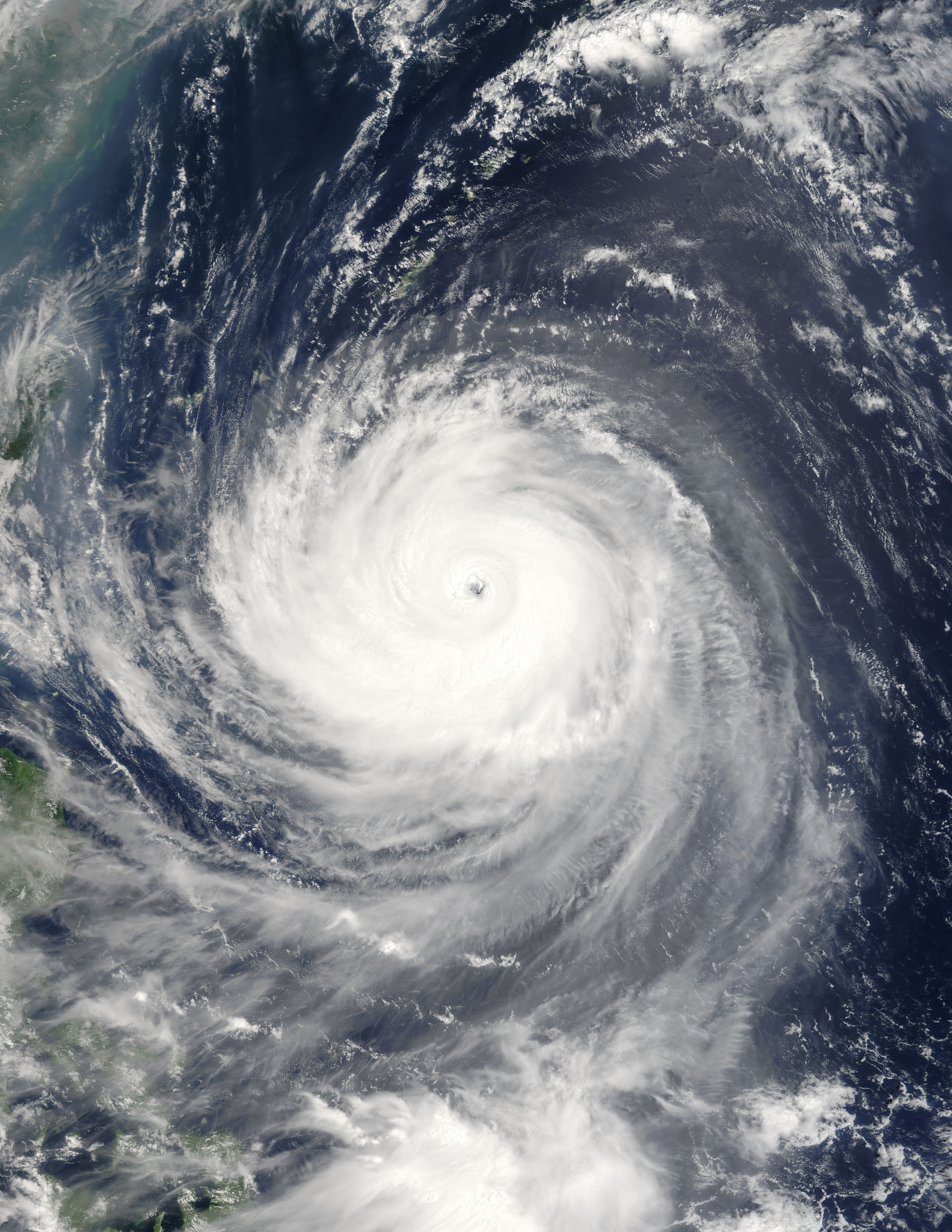
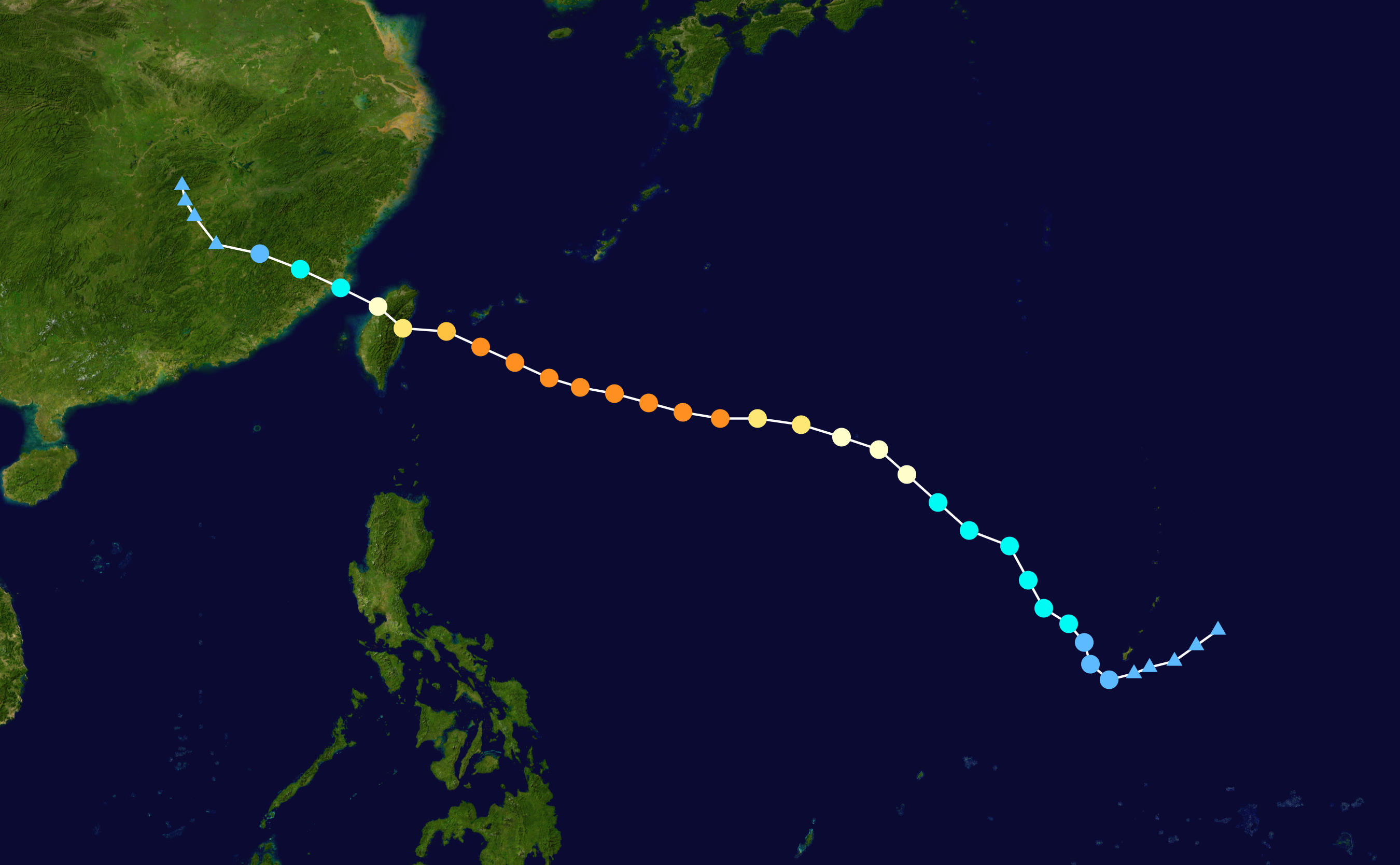
- Duration: August 24 – September 2
- Peak intensity: 175 km/h (110 mph) (10-min); 925 hPa (mbar)

Tropical Depression 13W formed on the afternoon of August 26 at 0600 UTC northeast of the island of Yap. Within 24 hours it was upgraded to Tropical Storm Talim and the next day became a Typhoon. Talim is a Philippine name for a knife or sharp cutting edge. Typhoon Talim was assigned the name Typhoon Isang for Philippine warnings when it entered the Philippine area of responsibility on August 29. Typhoon Talim (Isang) made landfall at 1800 UTC August 31 (0200 PHT September 1) as a Category 3 storm. Talim dissipated over southeastern China on September 1. Typhoon Talim left at least 110 people dead and 23 missing in Fujian, Zhejiang, Jiangxi & Anhui provinces, with at least 40 people dead in the latter province due to landslides.

There were 167 fatalities in China. It also left 5 dead in Taiwan.

=== Typhoon Nabi (Jolina) ===
- Very strong typhoon (JMA)
- Category 5 super typhoon (SSHWS)
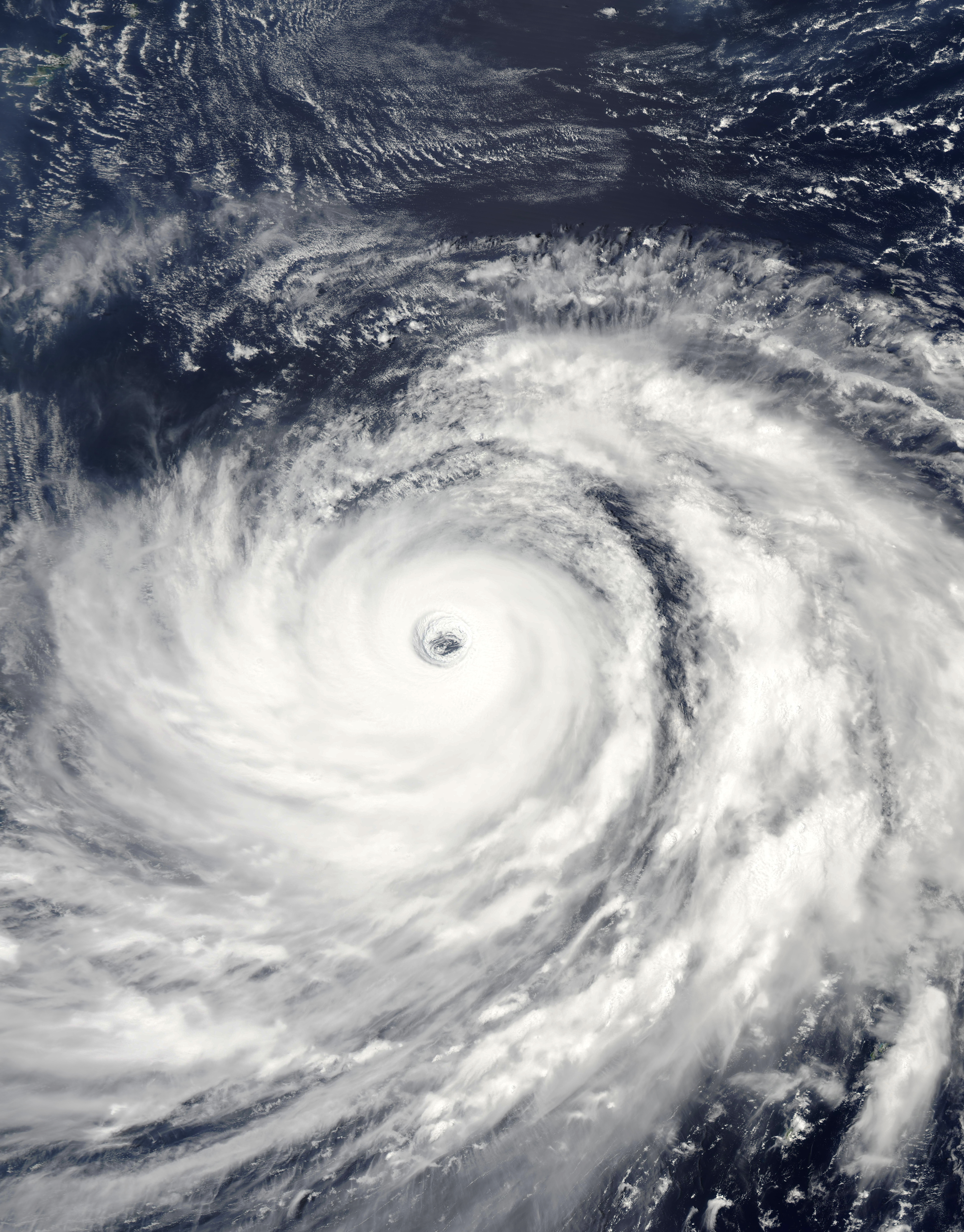
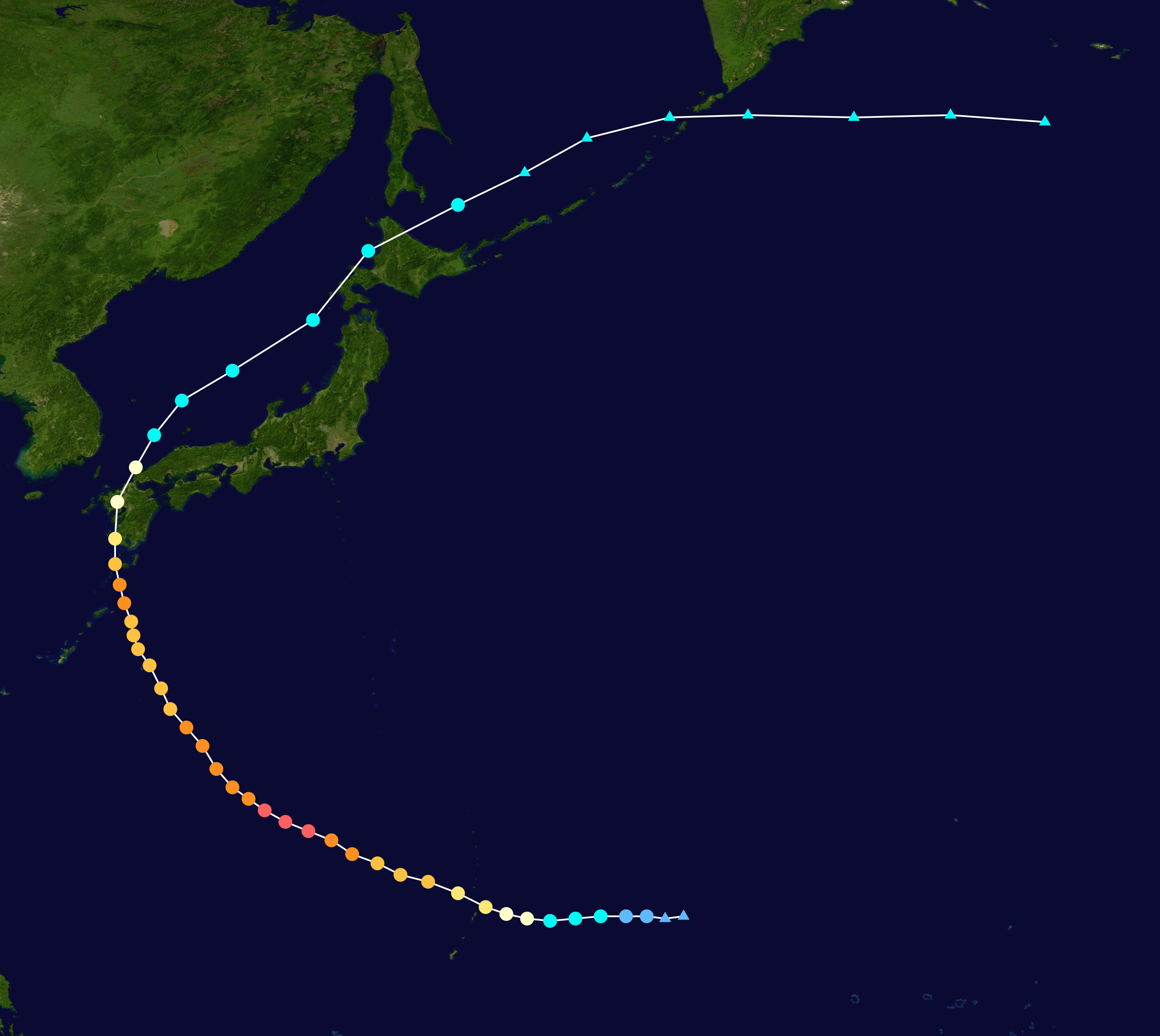
- Duration: August 28 – September 8
- Peak intensity: 175 km/h (110 mph) (10-min); 925 hPa (mbar)

Typhoon Nabi formed from a tropical depression on the afternoon of August 29 at 0600 UTC (1600 AEST) east of Saipan. 18 hours later it was upgraded to Tropical Storm Nabi. Nabi is a Korean word for a butterfly. It strengthened into a Typhoon on August 30 and passed near the islands of Saipan and Guam on August 31.After passing near the Marianas Islands, the storm continued to strengthen until reaching Category 5 intensity on September 1. Typhoon Nabi was assigned the name Jolina for Philippine warnings when it entered the Philippine area of responsibility on September 3. Typhoon Nabi (Jolina) passed to the east of the island of Okinawa, Japan, and made landfall in the Kagoshima Prefecture of Japan on September 6 as a Category 2 storm. It dissipated shortly after that.

Twenty-one deaths have been reported in Japan. On September 8, five people were missing in South Korea and fifty in Japan as a result of the storm. Japan also reported 143 injured. The storm damaged 10,000 homes in Japan, where 31 of 47 prefectures reported some damage. Eighty-eight roads in Japan were damaged, and 168 landslides were reported there. The heaviest damage was in Miyazaki prefecture on the island of Kyūshū. There were no deaths in the Marianas Islands. Saipan did experience heavy wind gusts of 120 km/h (75 mph). Guam experienced gale-force wind gusts in addition to approximately 75 mm (3.0 in) of rain.

=== Typhoon Khanun (Kiko) ===
- Very strong typhoon (JMA)
- Category 4 typhoon (SSHWS)
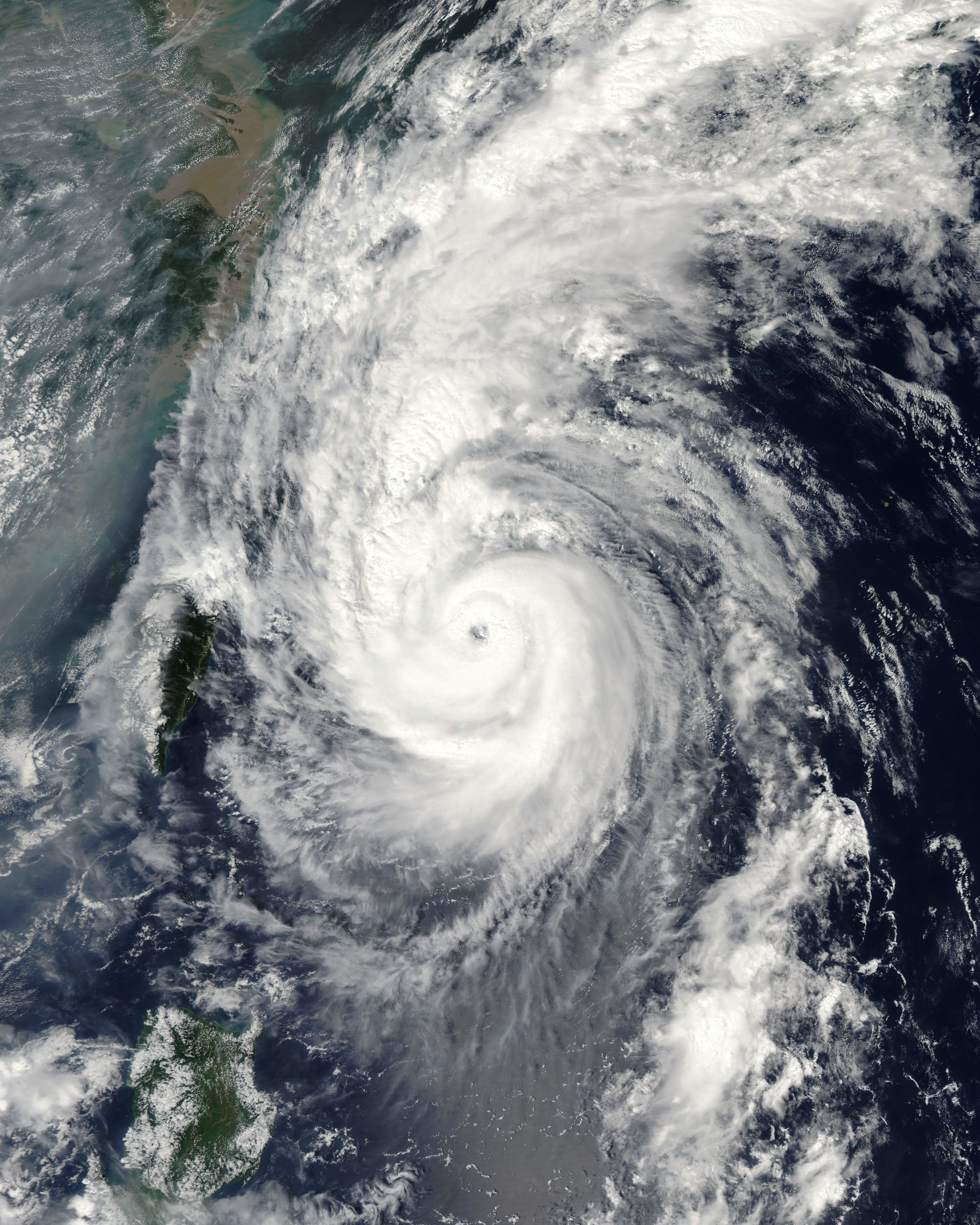
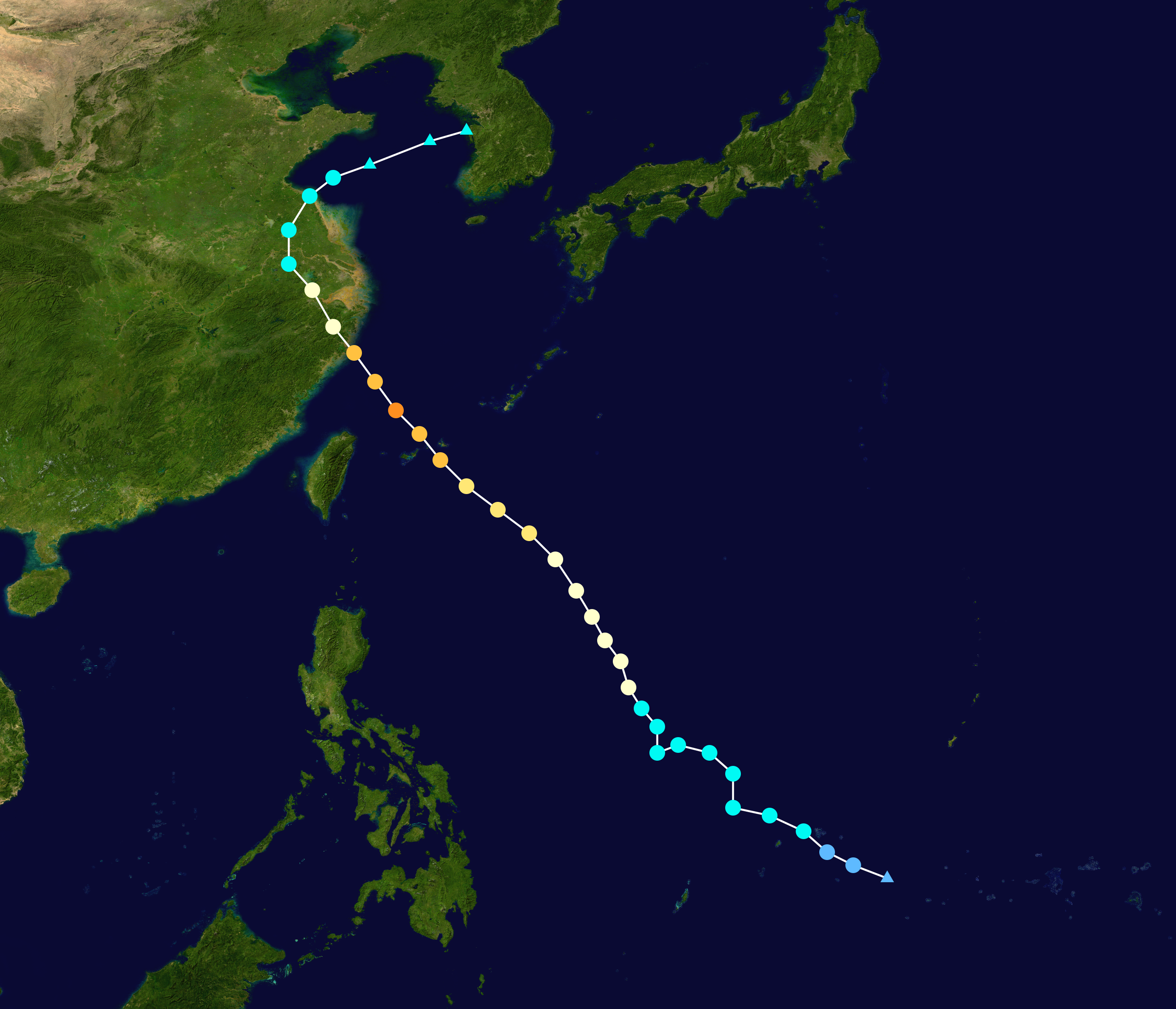
- Duration: September 5 – September 12
- Peak intensity: 155 km/h (100 mph) (10-min); 945 hPa (mbar)

Tropical Depression 15W formed from a well-defined low-pressure system located about 50 nautical miles (93 kilometres) east of Yap on September 6. It strengthened into a tropical storm later that day. The system was classified as a tropical storm by the Joint Typhoon Warning Center on September 6, while the Japan Meteorological Agency, the agency responsible for naming typhoons, did not upgrade the system until a day later. Tropical Storm 15W entered the Philippine area of responsibility on September 7. It was named Kiko by PAGASA first before being named Khanun by the JMA. Khanun is the Thai name for jackfruit. Typhoon Khanun (Kiko) made landfall in eastern China on September 11 at 0600 UTC (1400 HKT). Khanun dissipated the next day, September 12.

More than 800,000 people were evacuated from their homes as the storm neared. Many people, evacuated by the army, were taken to schools, railway stations, hotels and other solid buildings to take shelter from the approaching storm.

The city of Taizhou, Zhejiang bore the initial brunt of the storm as it was close to where the storm made landfall, 220 km south of Shanghai. Other coastal cities braced for the typhoon as it headed north.Damages totaled to $1.22 billion (2005 USD). There were 25 deaths in China.

Japan's southern Sakishima Islands suffered strong winds, high waves and heavy rains as the storm passed. Opening hours at some polling stations were altered to make sure citizens could still vote in the Japanese general election despite the weather.

=== Tropical Storm Vicente ===
- Tropical storm (JMA)
- Tropical storm (SSHWS)
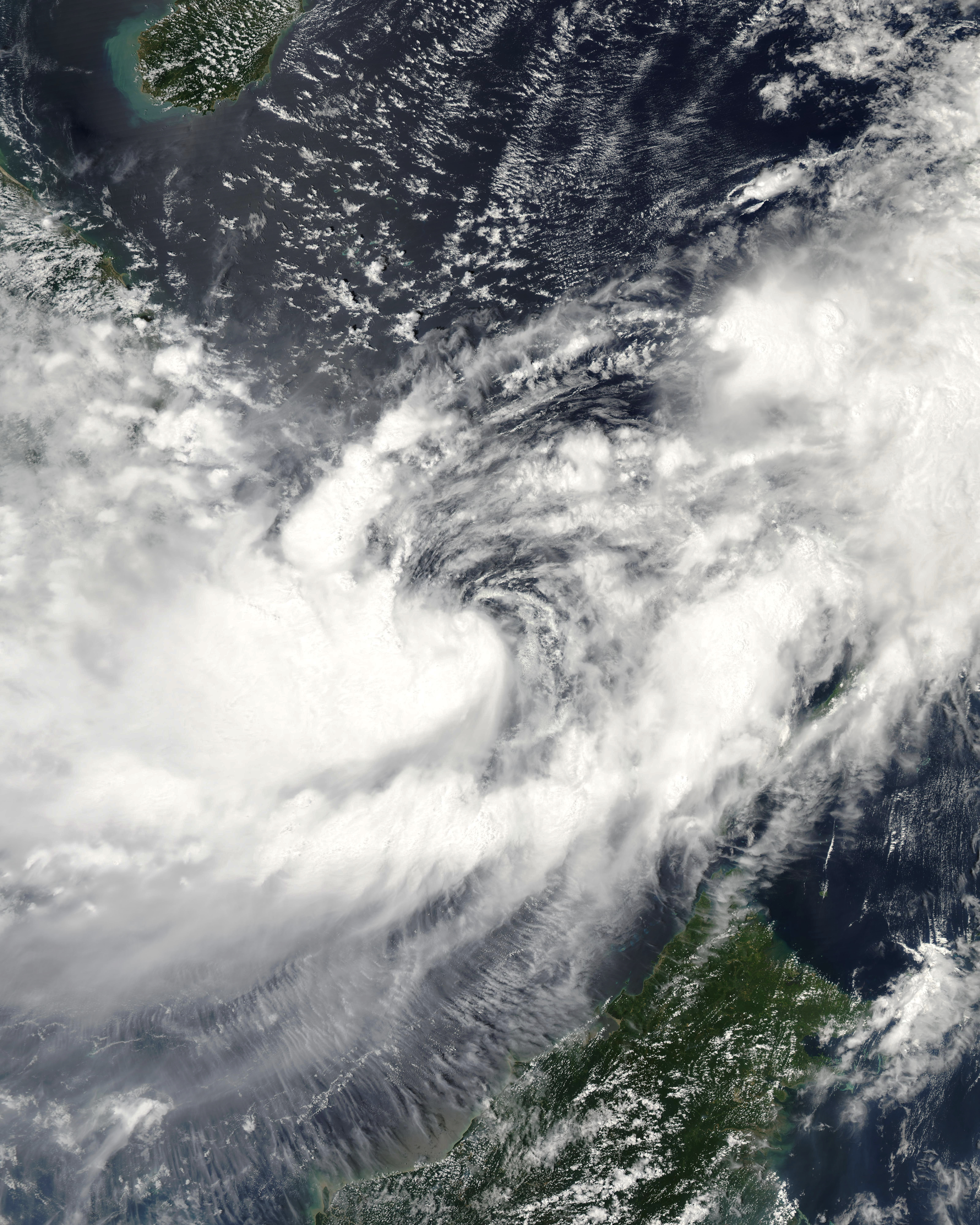
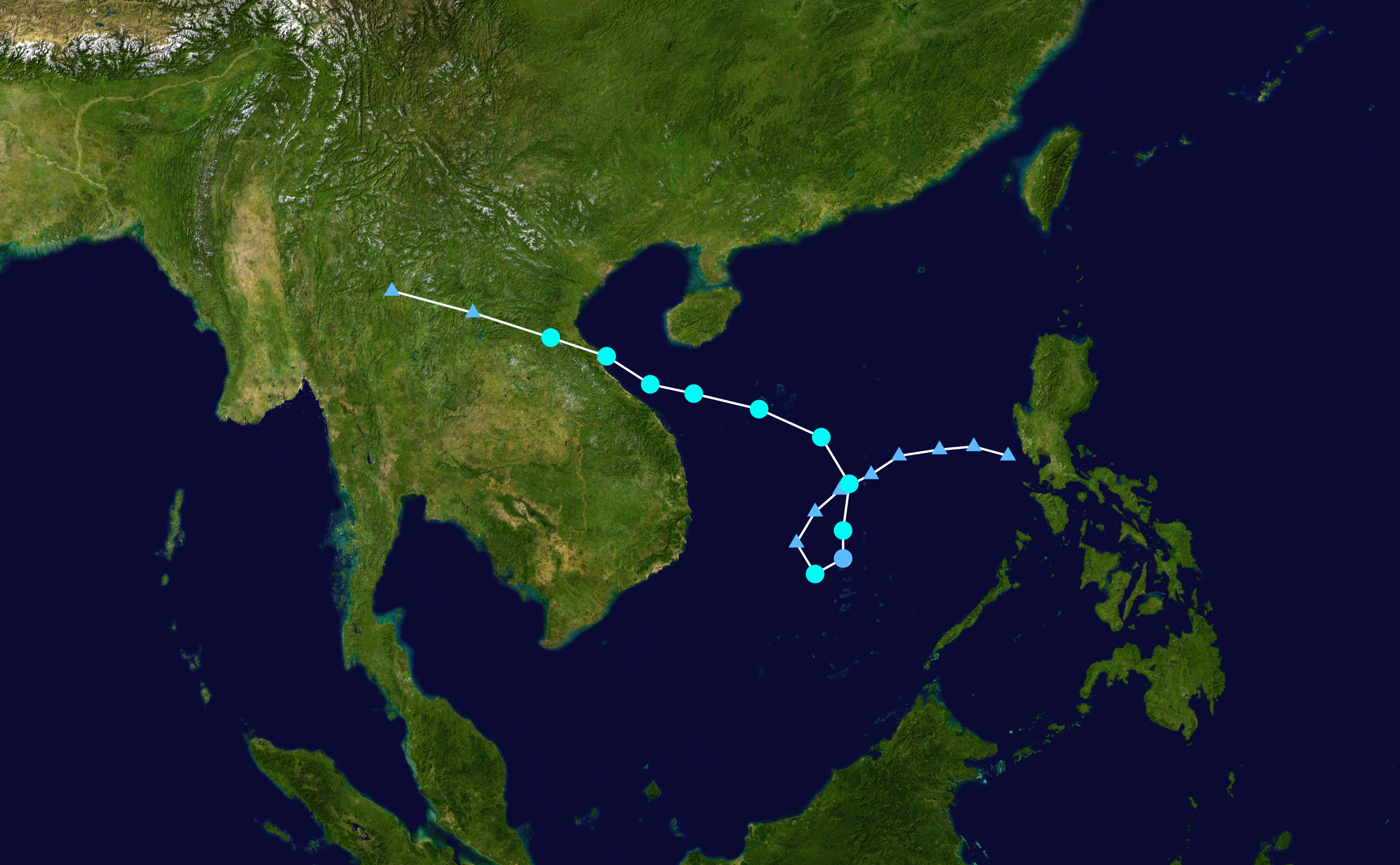
- Duration: September 16 – September 19
- Peak intensity: 85 km/h (50 mph) (10-min); 985 hPa (mbar)

Tropical Depression 16W formed 205 nautical miles (380 kilometres) east-southeast of Dong Tac Airport, Vietnam on the morning of September 16. It reached Tropical Storm strength overnight local time and was named Vicente, a Chamorro male name. Shortly after forming, Vicente interacted with a tropical disturbance west of Luzon and made a cyclonic loop. Vicente then absorbed the disturbance before passing just south of Hainan Island. Eventually, Vicente tracked into the Vietnam coast northwest of Huế on September 18 and gradually dissipated.

As the pressure gradient between Vicente and a ridge of high pressure over southeastern China brought a strong easterly airstream to the coastal areas of Guangdong and caused rough seas with swells, a swimmer was drowned on September 17. Another one drowned the following day in rough seas at Sai Kung, Hong Kong. Also, a ship from China struck a reef between Shangchuan and Xiachuan Islands. All seventeen crew members were rescued. In Vietnam, about 5 people were killed or reported missing.

=== Typhoon Saola ===
- Typhoon (JMA)
- Category 3 typhoon (SSHWS)
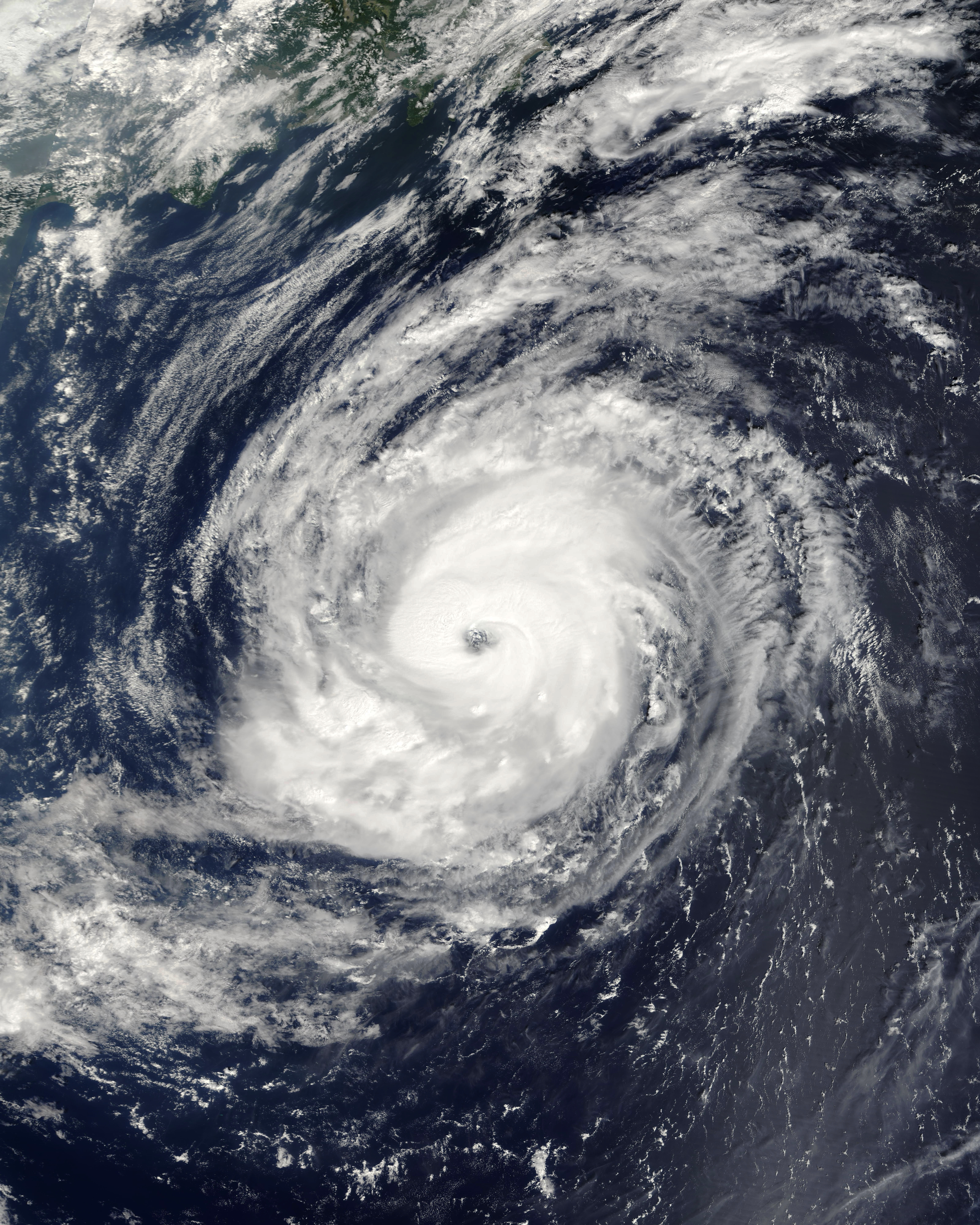
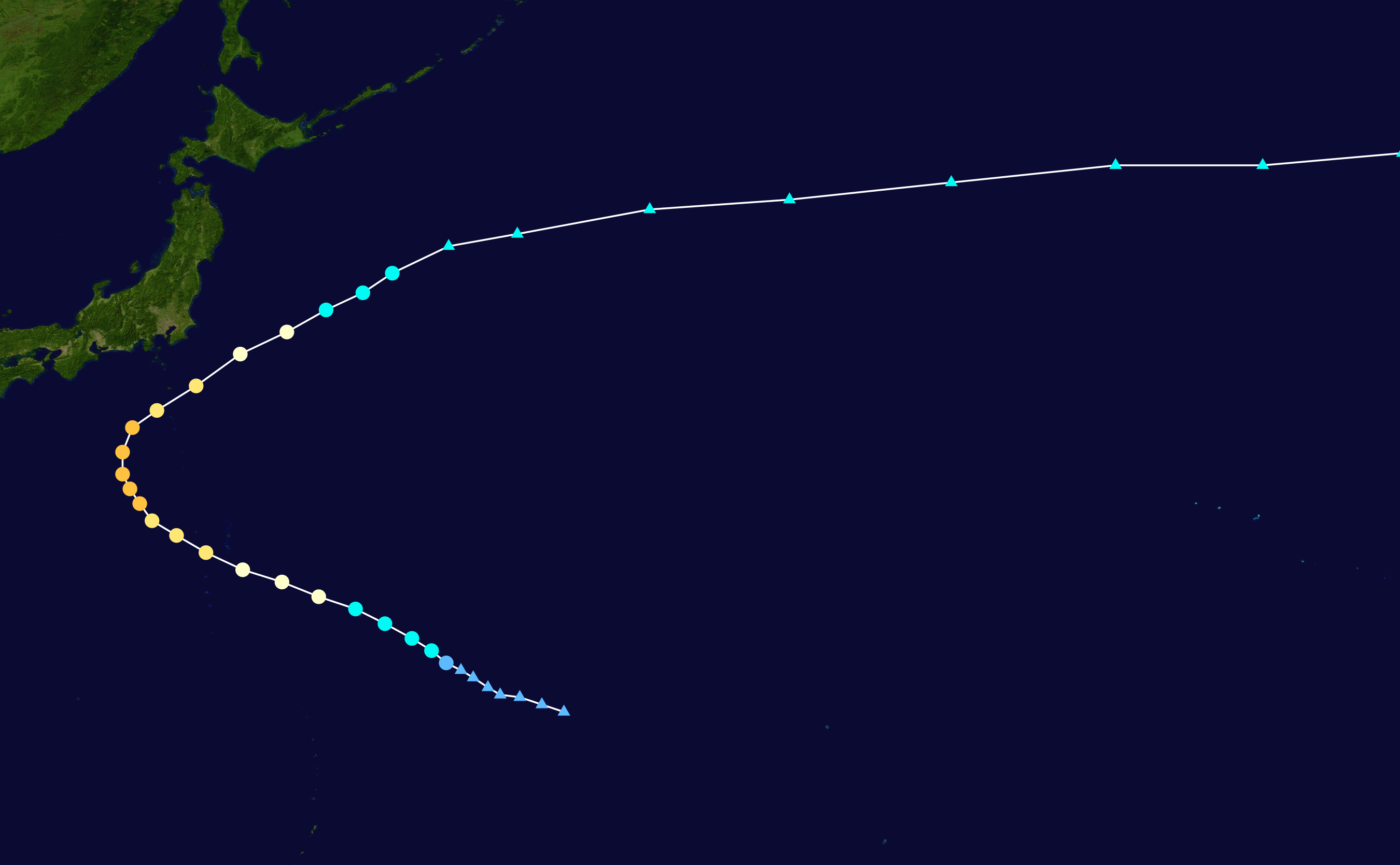
- Duration: September 19 – September 26
- Peak intensity: 150 km/h (90 mph) (10-min); 950 hPa (mbar)

A tropical disturbance formed from the monsoon and moved northwest on September 15. The next day, it became more organized and the Japan Meteorological Agency initiated a warning for Tropical Depression 18W southwest of Marcus Island, Japan at 0000 UTC (0900 JST), September 20. The depression was upgraded to Tropical Storm Saola 18 hours later as it continued to strengthen moving westward. Due to a normal speed of a typhoon and warm waters, Saola became a typhoon and reached peak intensity early on September 22. The storm didn't made landfall but it affect Japan from September 23 to 25 by bringing heavy rainfall. Saola weakened to a tropical storm and became extratropical on September 26.

=== Typhoon Damrey (Labuyo) ===
- Typhoon (JMA)
- Category 2 typhoon (SSHWS)
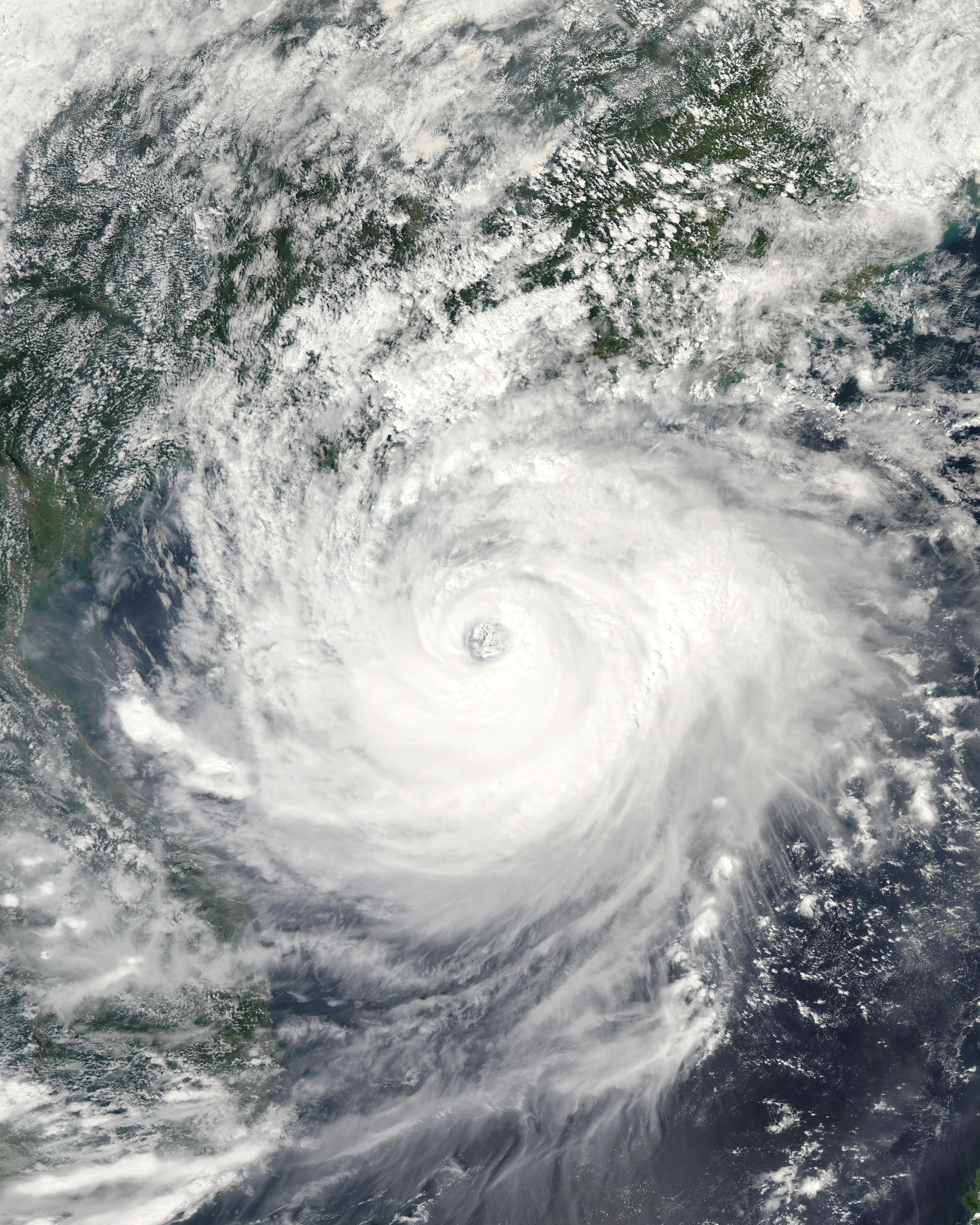
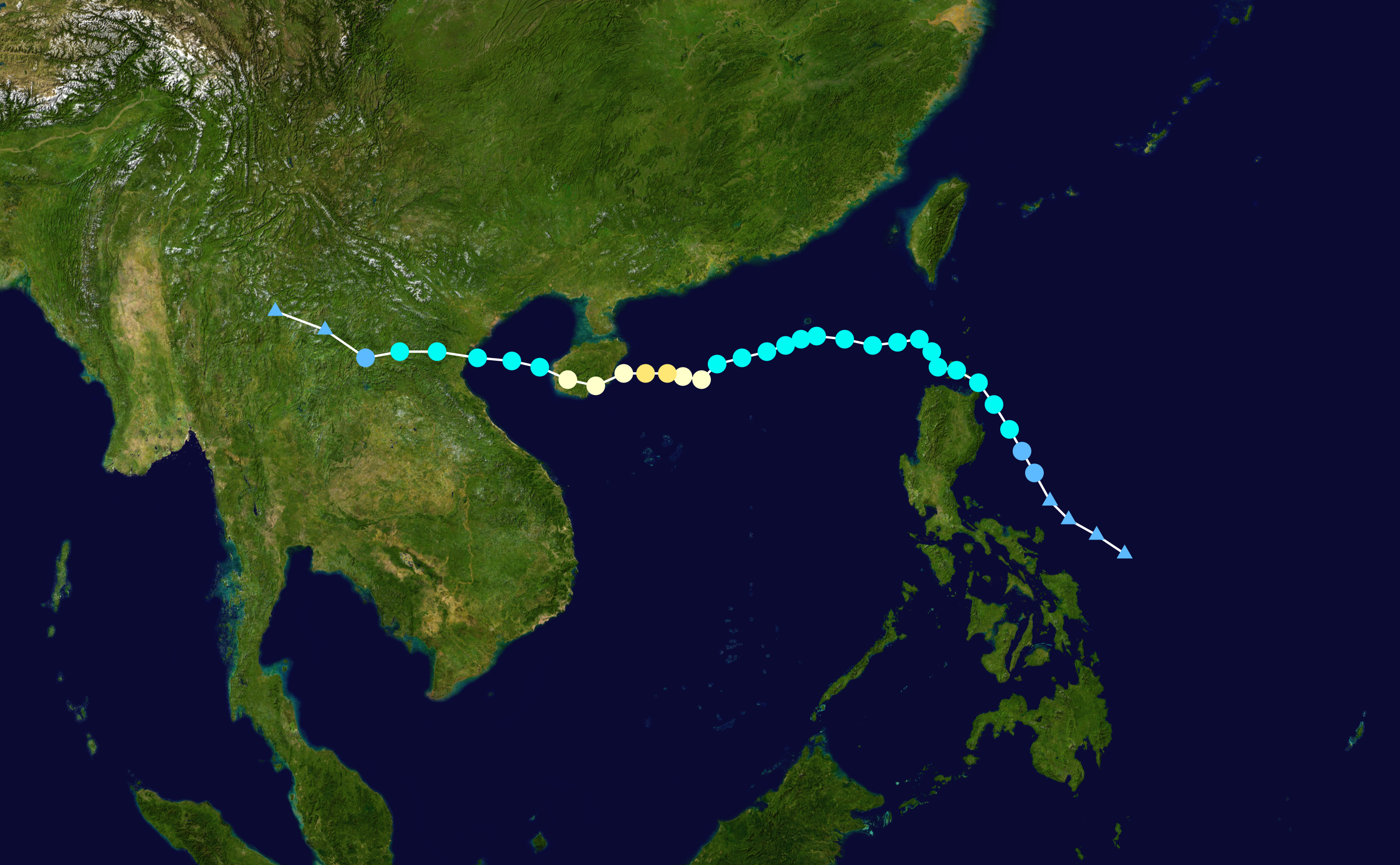
- Duration: September 19 – September 28
- Peak intensity: 150 km/h (90 mph) (10-min); 955 hPa (mbar)

Due to its proximity to the Philippines, PAGASA assigned it the name Labuyo and began issuing advisories on a disturbed area of tropical weather to the east of the islands on September 19. The JMA started to warn on the system on the same day. On September 20 it was classified as Tropical Depression 17W by the Joint Typhoon Warning Center. On September 21, it was upgraded to Tropical Storm Damrey. It strengthened into a typhoon on September 24. Damrey is a Cambodian word for elephant.

Typhoon Damrey (Labuyo) made landfall at Wanning, in China's Hainan province at 2000 UTC, September 25 (0400 September 26 local time) with maximum sustained winds up to 180 km/h. This made Damrey the strongest typhoon to strike Hainan since Typhoon Marge in September 1973. During the period when Typhoon Damrey affected Vietnam, the highest sustained wind speed recorded on land was 119 km/h (74 mph) at Văn Lý (Nam Định). In addition, several other locations in Northern Vietnam and Thanh Hóa province recorded sustained wind speeds ranging from level 9 to 10 on the Beaufort scale. At least 16 people are believed to have died in China, and the entire province of Hainan suffered power outages. Damrey then went on to impact Vietnam before losing tropical characteristics while a Tropical Storm. The Joint Typhoon Warning Center ceased advisories with the final one at 0900 UTC September 27 with the system 90 nautical miles (170 km) south-southwest of Hanoi, Vietnam.

=== Typhoon Longwang (Maring) ===
- Very strong typhoon (JMA)
- Category 4 typhoon (SSHWS)
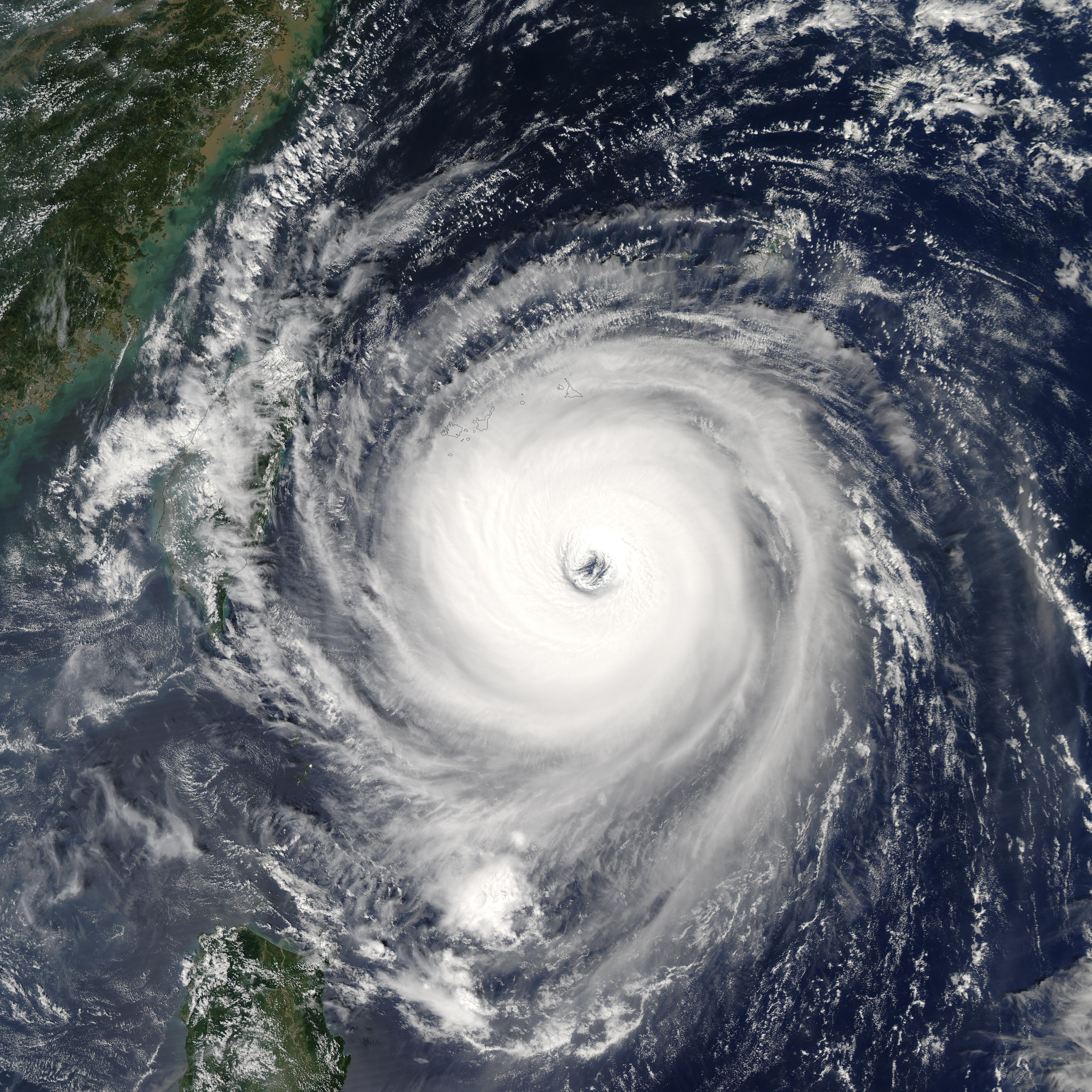
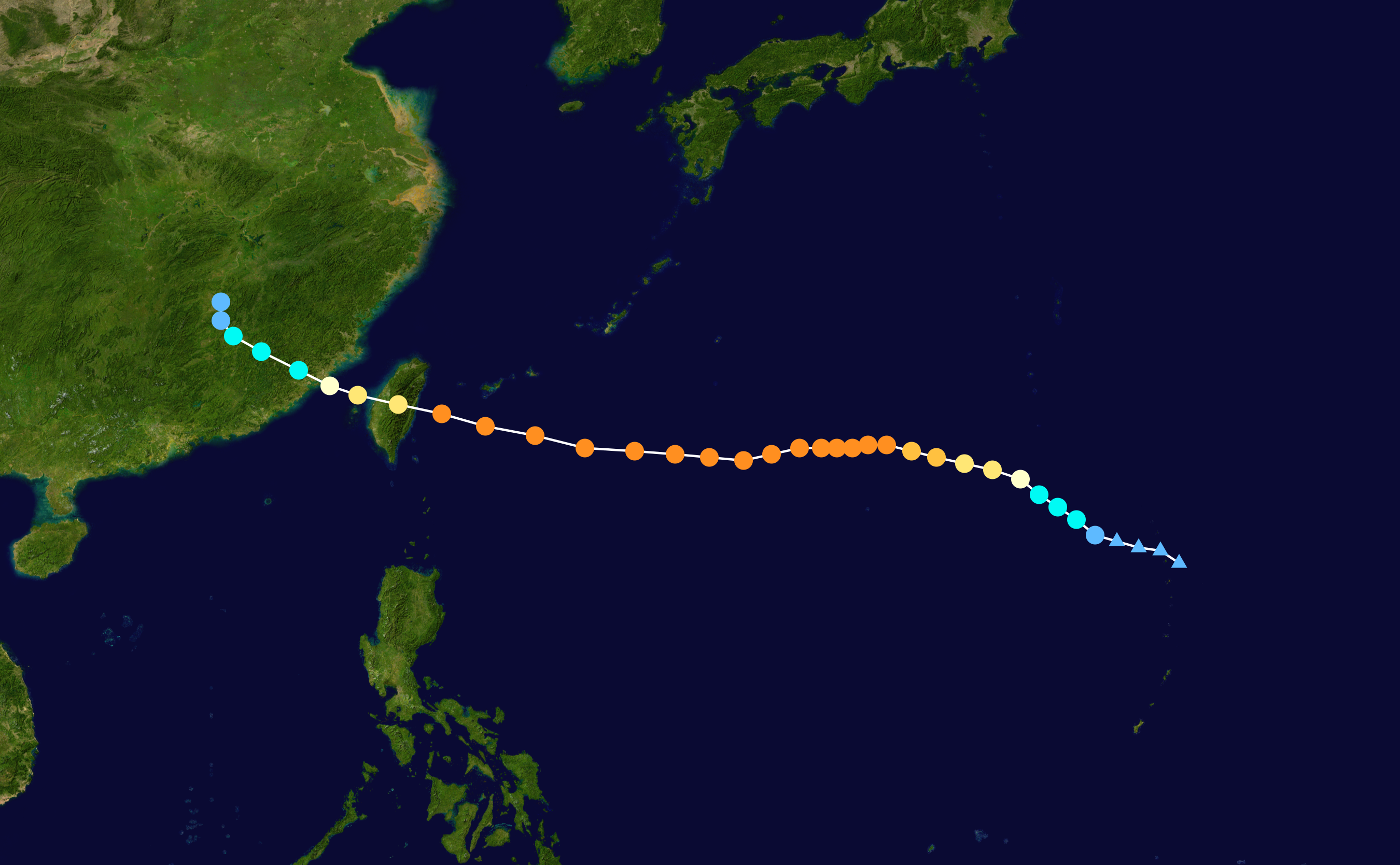
- Duration: September 25 – October 3
- Peak intensity: 175 km/h (110 mph) (10-min); 930 hPa (mbar)

Tropical Depression 19W formed about 335 nautical miles (620 km) south-southeast of Iwo Jima, Japan on September 26. The Joint Typhoon Warning Center initiated a warning for it at 0000 UTC the same day, and was upgraded to Tropical Storm Longwang six hours later. Longwang is Chinese for Dragon King. At 0300 UTC September 27, the Joint Typhoon Warning Center upgraded it to a typhoon. It continued to increase in strength as it tracked west to west-northwest towards Taiwan, and was upgraded to a super typhoon on September 29, acquiring annular characteristics. PAGASA named the storm Maring for Philippine warnings on September 29. Longwang made landfall at 0515 local time on October 2 south of Hualien City, Taiwan as a Category 4 storm. Half a day later, at 2135 local time (1335 UTC), it made second landfall in Fujian Province, China as a minimal typhoon. Longwang dissipated on the next day.

Despite its intensity, Longwang caused mostly property damage, and claimed only one life in Taiwan.

=== Typhoon Kirogi (Nando) ===
- Very strong typhoon (JMA)
- Category 4 typhoon (SSHWS)
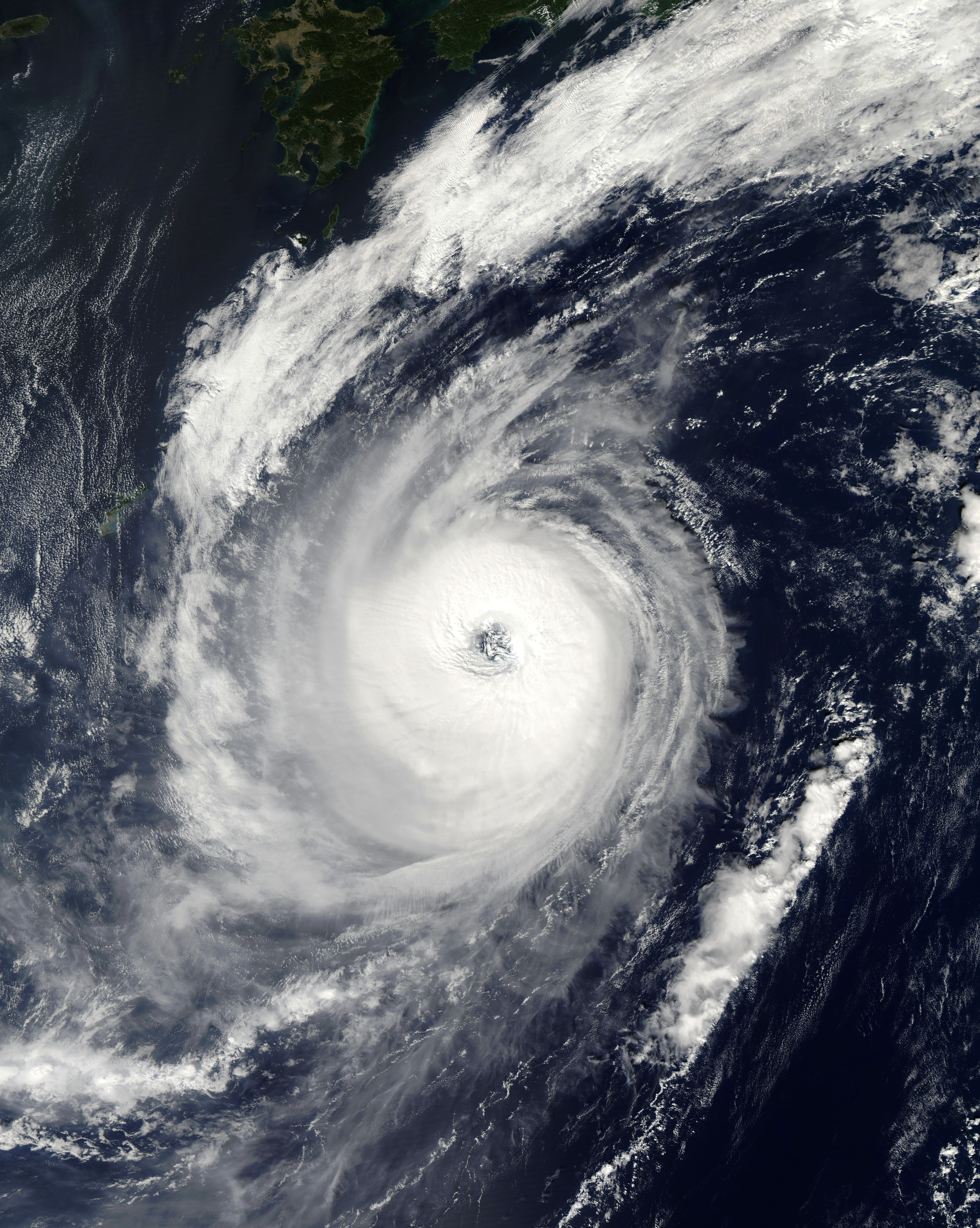
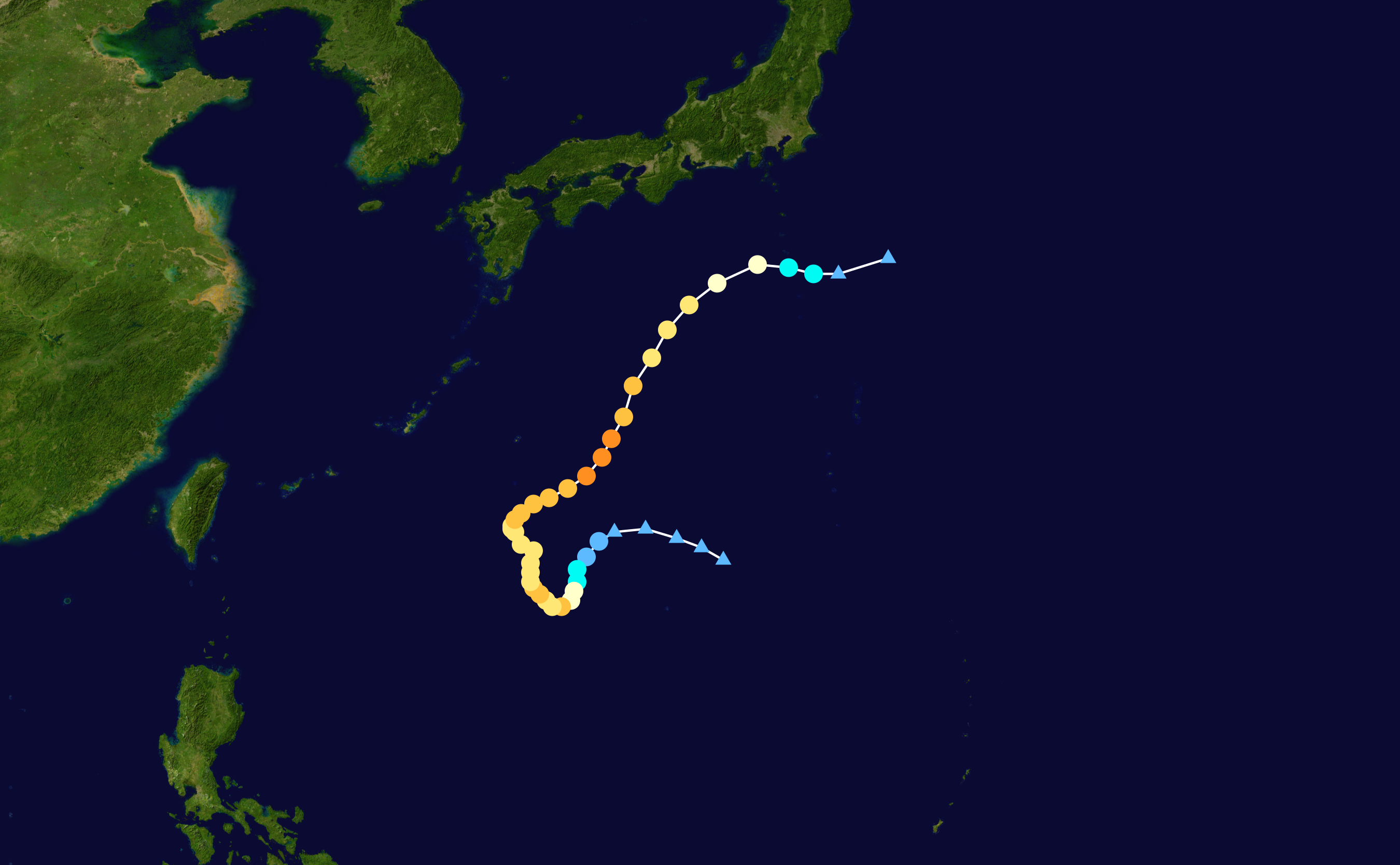
- Duration: October 9 – October 19
- Peak intensity: 185 km/h (115 mph) (10-min); 930 hPa (mbar)

A large cluster of thunderstorms formed with convection developed and separated into three low-pressure areas on October 6. But due to warm waters in the western side, two failed to become storms and the Japan Meteorological Agency began issuing warnings for the other disturbance. This disturbance became Tropical Depression 21W while located southeast of Okinawa. At 1200 UTC, October 9 and assigned the name Kirogi to it at 0600 UTC next day. Prior to becoming a Tropical Storm, it entered the Philippine area of responsibility and was assigned the name Nando by PAGASA for Philippine warnings. JTWC finally issued a warning for Kirogi at 0900 UTC, October 10, despite listing it as a Tropical Depression. It was upgraded to a typhoon at 0000 UTC October 12, and reached Category 4 strength about nine hours later. On October 16, Kirogi weakened was it pushes northeast. Kirogi was declared extratropical at 0300 UTC October 19. Kirogi is a Korean word for a type of migrating bird that lives in North Korea from autumn to spring.

=== Typhoon Kai-tak ===
- Typhoon (JMA)
- Category 2 typhoon (SSHWS)
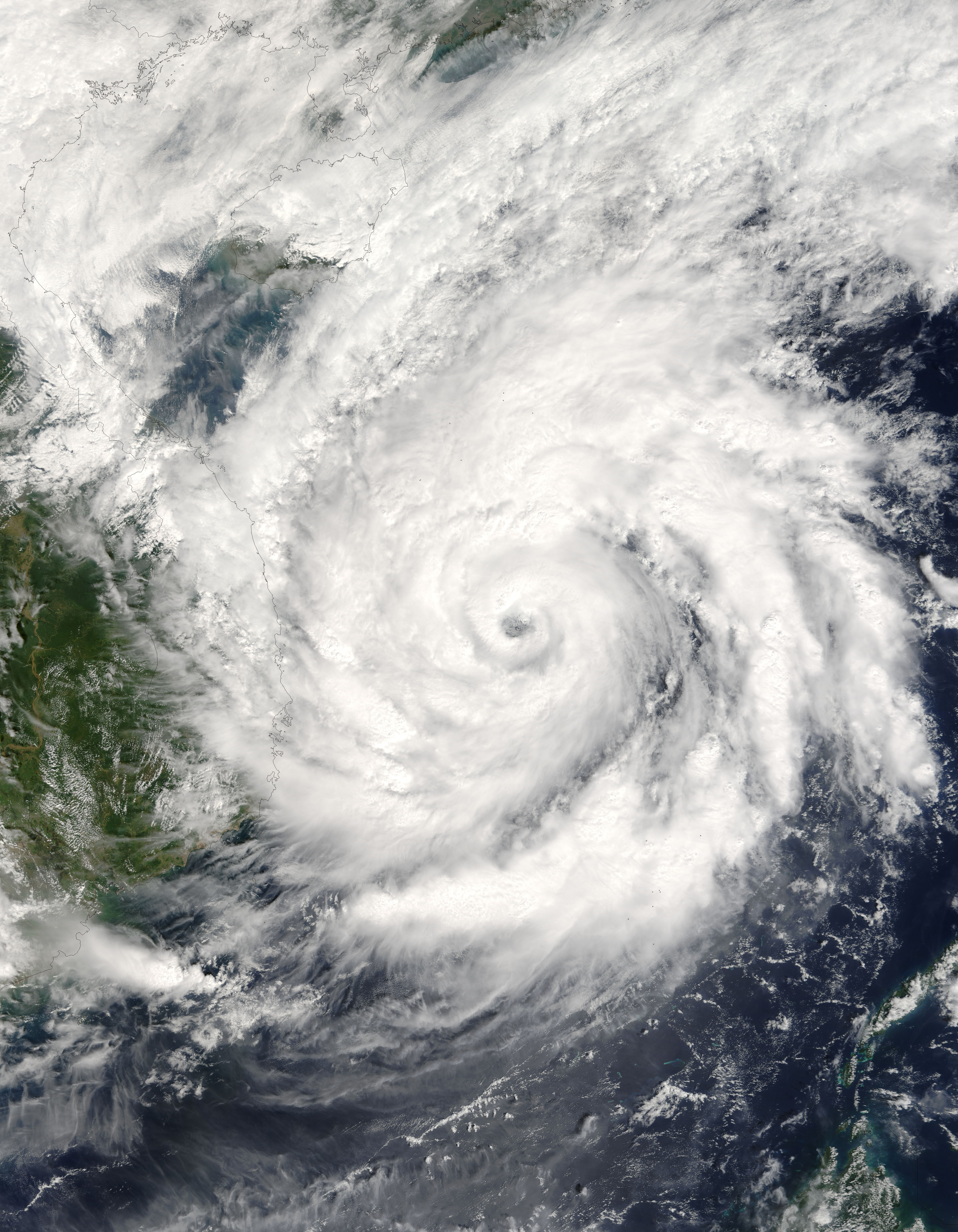
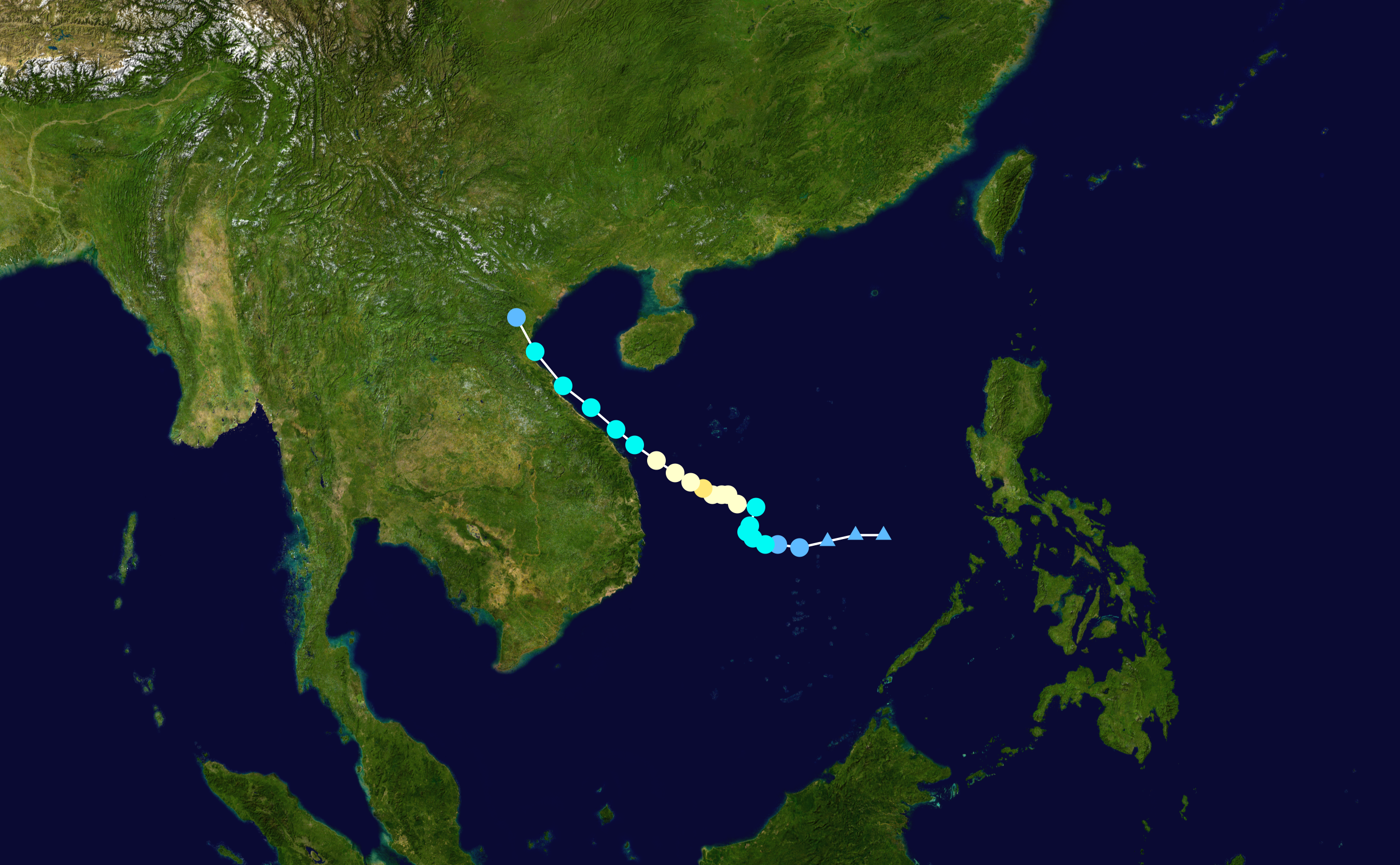
- Duration: October 28 – November 2
- Peak intensity: 150 km/h (90 mph) (10-min); 950 hPa (mbar)

A tropical disturbance developed north of Papua New Guinea on October 20. It entered in an area of favorable environments on October 23, as it slowly intensified. On October 25, it affected the Philippines and rapidly moved to the South China Sea on October 27. The next day, the Japan Meteorological Agency initiated marine warnings for a Tropical Depression. Fifteen hours later, the Joint Typhoon Warning Center issued the number 22W to the system. The next day it was upgraded to Tropical Storm Kai-tak. Kai-tak was a name submitted by Hong Kong in honor of their former airport. On October 30 it was upgraded to a Typhoon. Kai-tak made landfall north of Huế, Vietnam, early on the morning of November 2. At least 19 people were killed and 10 others were left missing in Vietnam. Damages from the storm were estimated to be at least $11 million (2005 USD).

=== Tropical Storm Tembin (Ondoy) ===
- Tropical storm (JMA)
- Tropical storm (SSHWS)
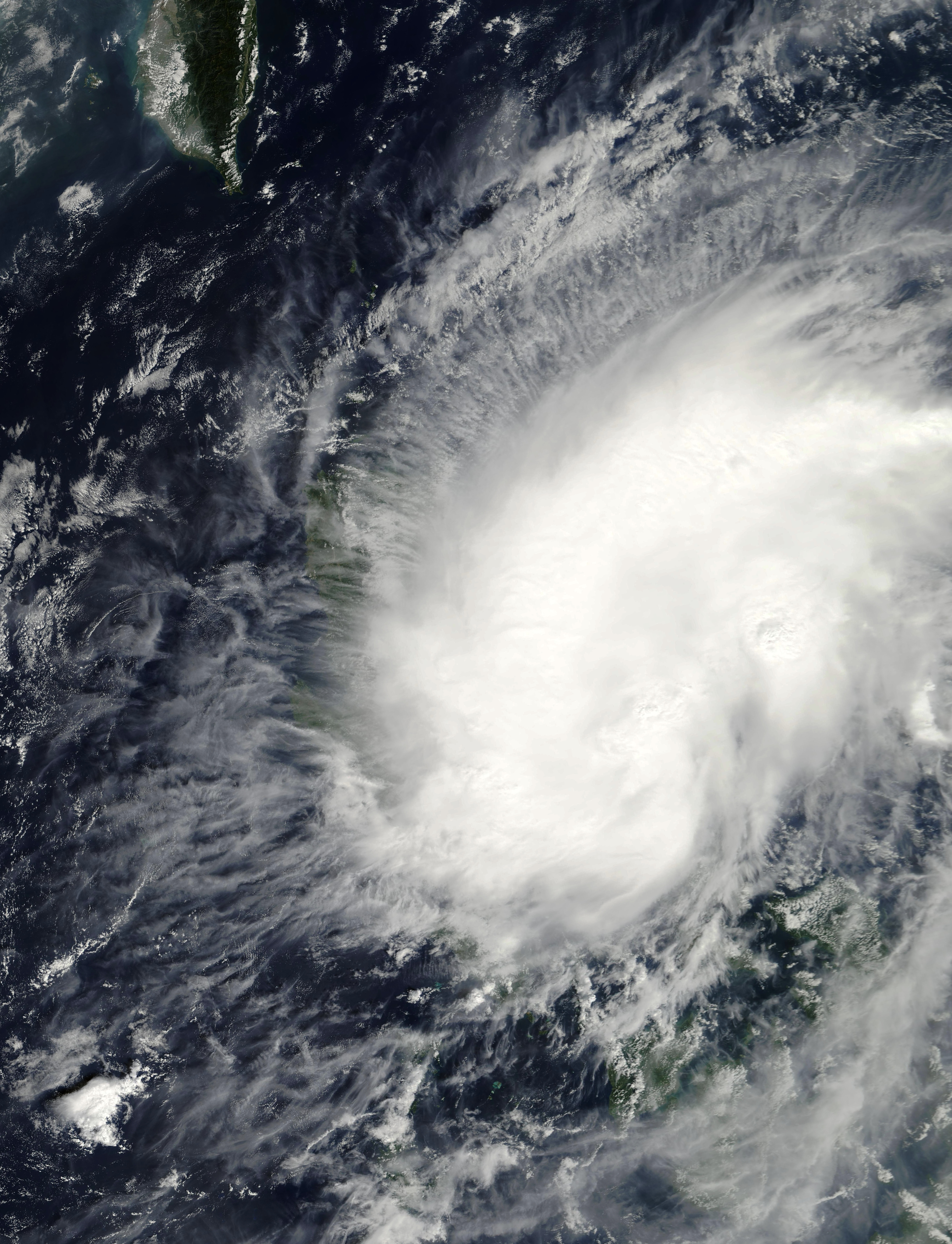
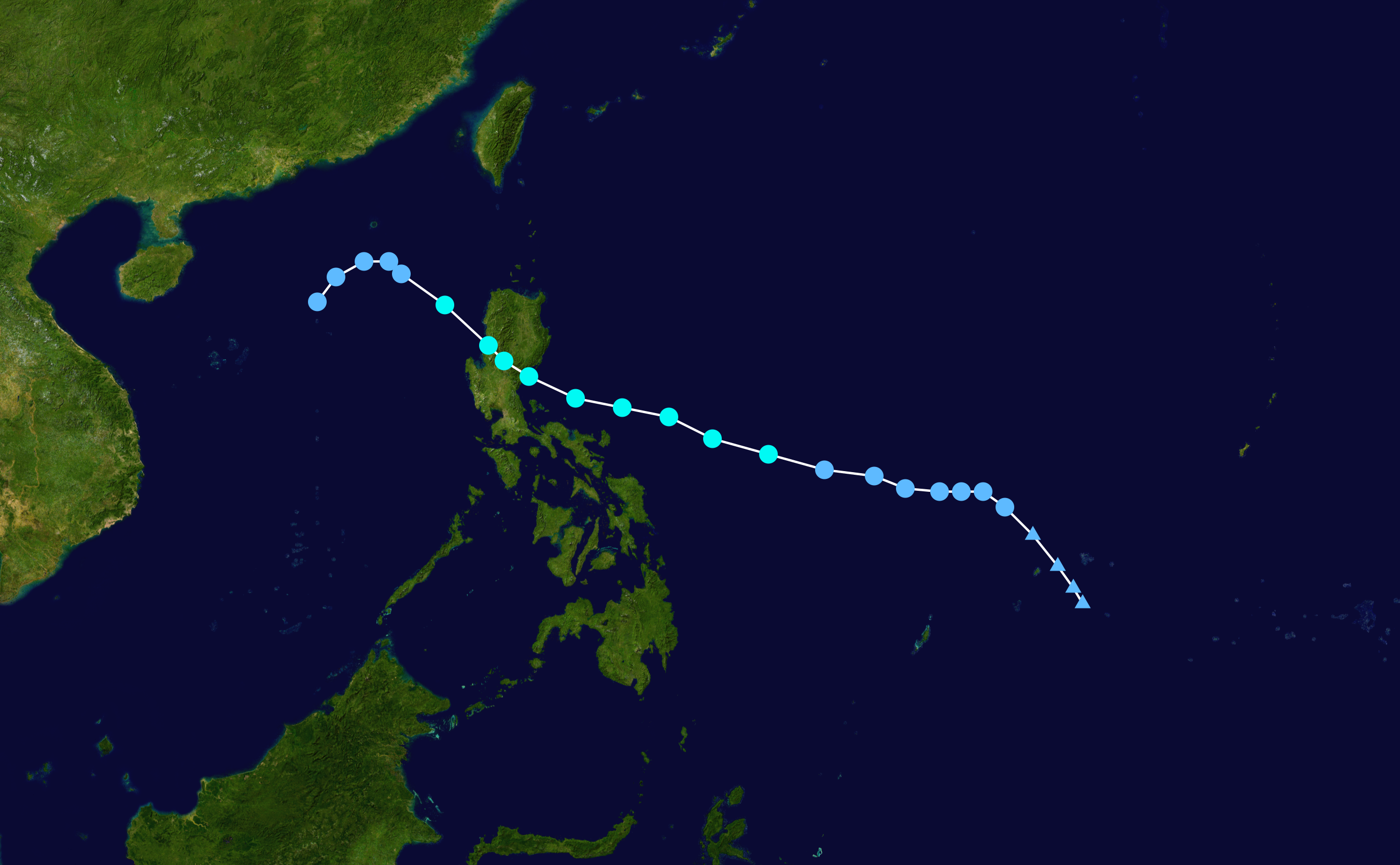
- Duration: November 7 – November 12
- Peak intensity: 65 km/h (40 mph) (10-min); 1002 hPa (mbar)

The Joint Typhoon Warning Center initiated warning for Tropical Depression 23W at 0900 UTC November 7, north-northwest of the Micronesian island of Yap. The storm gained enough power to warrant upgrading to a Tropical Storm 12 hours later. The system entered the Philippine area of responsibility on the morning of November 8 and was named Ondoy by PAGASA. The storm encountered shear as it moved west, and lost organisation on November 8, being downgraded to a tropical depression. On November 9 it regained tropical storm strength and had a better LLCC (low-level circulation centre). On November 10 it was named Tembin by the JMA. Tembin is a Japanese constellation for the group of stars known in the west as Libra. Tembin then made landfall near midnight November 11 local time in the northern Philippines and lost much of its circulation and convection. Tembin dissipated rapidly the next day.

=== Severe Tropical Storm Bolaven (Pepeng) ===
- Severe tropical storm (JMA)
- Category 1 typhoon (SSHWS)
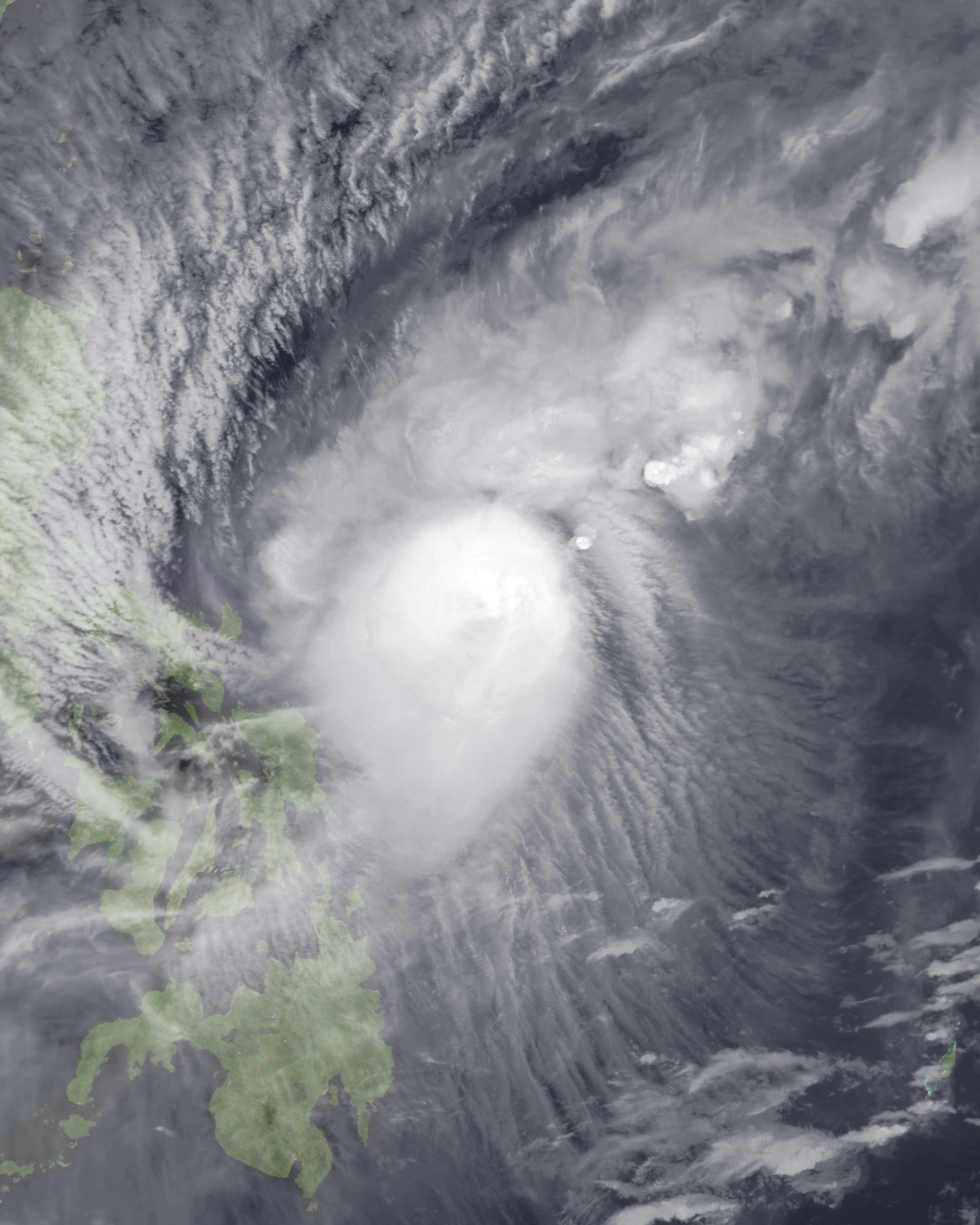
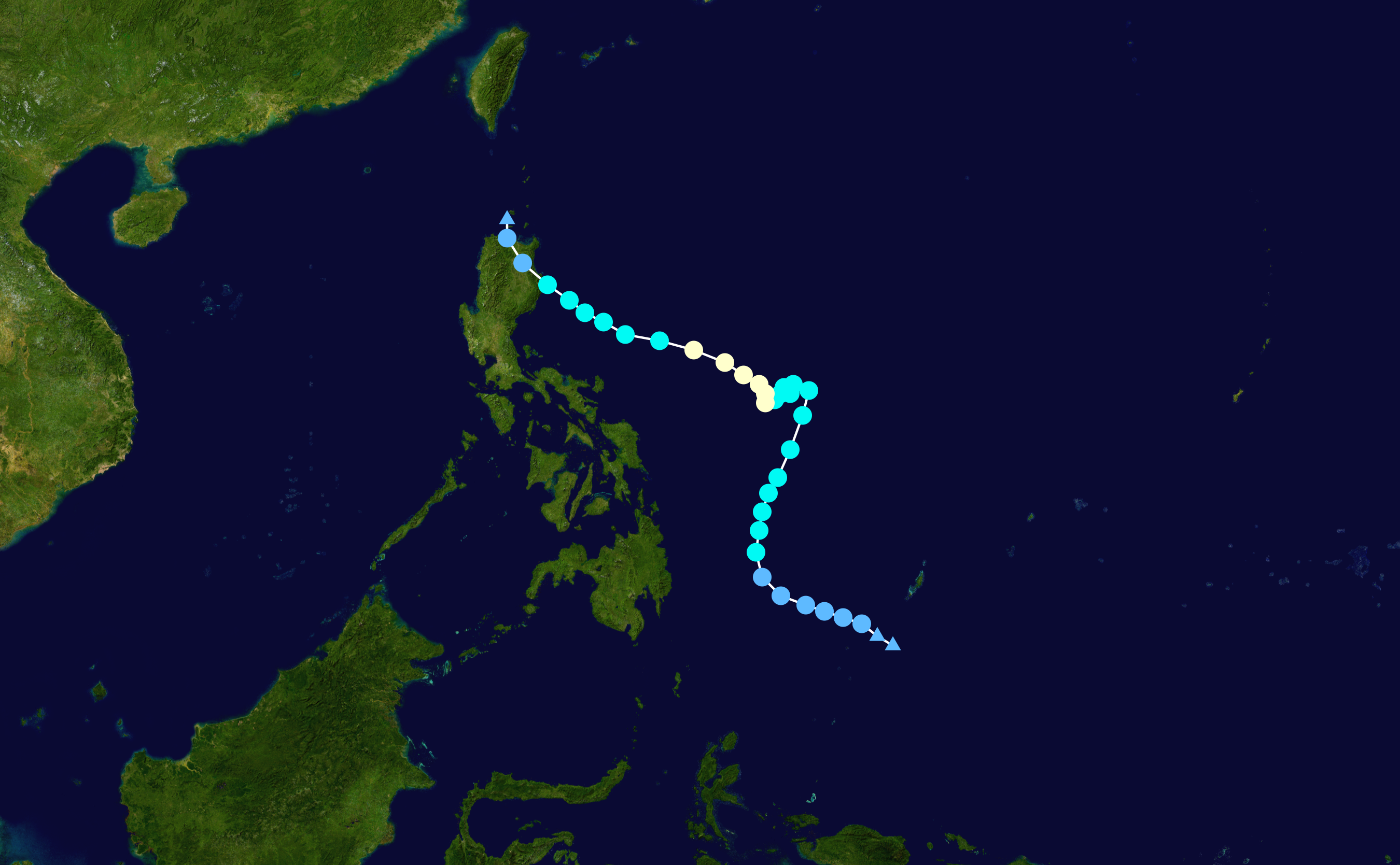
- Duration: November 14 – November 20
- Peak intensity: 100 km/h (65 mph) (10-min); 985 hPa (mbar)

A low-pressure area formed along from the outflow of Tropical Storm Tembin on November 10. The Joint Typhoon Warning Center initiated a TCFA warning for a low-pressure system about 150 nautical miles (280 kilometres) west-southwest of Palau late on November 12. This was upgraded to a tropical depression the next afternoon, 290 nautical miles (540 kilometres) west of Palau. Forming inside the Philippine area of responsibility it has been named Pepeng by PAGASA. It was named Bolaven on November 16 by the JMA. Bolaven is a Laotian word meaning plateau or mesa. Although it strengthened into a Category 1 typhoon on November 17, it weakened to a tropical storm before making landfall on November 20 at about 800 local time in Cagayan Valley in the northern Philippines. Bolaven rapidly dissipated that same day north of the Philippines on November 21.

=== Other systems ===
- On May 8, a parade of tropical disturbances formed and affected southern Philippines from an ITCZ. As the ITCZ weakened on May 13, the last disturbance formed southeast of Mindanao, Philippines. It moved north until it became a tropical depression on May 16 at 0000 UTC (0800 PHT) 180 nautical miles (330 kilometres) east of Surigao on Mindanao Island. It was assigned the name Crising by PAGASA. The storm never organized into a tropical storm and did not receive the more recognized International name for West Pacific storms. The storm drifted northwest then southwest and began losing convection. PAGASA stopped tracking the storm 24 hours later on the 17th at 0000 UTC (0800 PHT) 145 nautical miles (269 kilometres) east of Surigao.
- A large tropical disturbance formed on July 2. The PAGASA issued a tropical depression strength near the Philippines on July 4 at 0600 UTC (1400 PHT) about 35 nautical miles (65 kilometres) northeast of Catarman on Samar Island, giving the name Emong. It was assigned the name Emong by PAGASA. The storm never organized into a tropical storm and did not receive the more recognized International name for West Pacific storms. As a poorly organized depression it drifted over Luzon on July 5. Upper-level shear and the depression's landfall caused the storm to lose organization on July 6 while located about 40 nautical miles (74 kilometres) south of Hong Kong.
- The meteorological agencies is now operated of Guangdong and Hainan upgraded a low-pressure center over South China Sea to a tropical depression at 0800 local time, October 6. The Hong Kong Observatory followed suit 30 hours later. The JTWC finally issued a warning for this system at 1500 UTC October 7 (2300 local time), and tropical depression number 20W was issued to the system. The JTWC issued its final advisory on the system just six hours later, 55 nautical miles (102 km) west-northwest of Huế, Vietnam. As the system never reached Tropical Storm strength, it was not given a name from the list. The only damage it did, if any, however, was that massive rainfall amounts were recorded – over 230 mm (9.1 in) were recorded in some parts of Hainan.
- On December 16, a tropical disturbance developed and was given the name Quedan by PAGASA. Quedan organized into Tropical Depression 25W on December 18 off the northern coast of Borneo. On December 19, the JTWC classified it as a Tropical Storm. The JMA upgraded it to a tropical depression, but they warned it for a brief time. The storm dissipated early on December 20, as wind shear increased on the system.

== Storm names ==
Within the North-western Pacific Ocean, both the Japan Meteorological Agency (JMA) and the Philippine Atmospheric, Geophysical and Astronomical Services Administration assign names to tropical cyclones that develop in the Western Pacific, which can result in a tropical cyclone having two names. The Japan Meteorological Agency's RSMC Tokyo — Typhoon Center assigns international names to tropical cyclones on behalf of the World Meteorological Organization's Typhoon Committee, should they be judged to have 10-minute sustained windspeeds of 65 km/h (40 mph). While the Philippine Atmospheric, Geophysical and Astronomical Services Administration assigns names to tropical cyclones which move into or form as a tropical depression in their area of responsibility located between 135°E and 115°E and between 5°N-25°N even if the cyclone has had an international name assigned to it. The names of significant tropical cyclones are retired, by both PAGASA and the Typhoon Committee. Should the list of names for the Philippine region be exhausted then names will be taken from an auxiliary list of which the first ten are published each season. Unused names are marked in gray.

=== International names ===
During the season 23 named tropical cyclones developed in the Western Pacific and were named by the Japan Meteorological Agency, when it was determined that they had become tropical storms. These names were contributed to a list of a 140 names submitted by the fourteen members nations and territories of the ESCAP/WMO Typhoon Committee. Each of the names in this list, except for Damrey, Longwang, Kirogi, Kai-tak, Tembin, and Bolaven, were assigned to storms for the first time (and only, in the cases of Matsa, and Nabi).

Kulap	Roke	Sonca	Nesat	Haitang	Nalgae	Banyan	Washi	Matsa	Sanvu	Mawar	Guchol
Talim	Nabi	Khanun	Vicente	Saola	Damrey	Longwang	Kirogi	Kai-tak	Tembin	Bolaven	

=== Philippines ===
Auring	Bising	Crising	Dante	Emong
Feria	Gorio	Huaning	Isang	Jolina
Kiko	Labuyo	Maring	Nando	Ondoy
Pepeng	Quedan	Ramil (unused)	Santi (unused)	Tino (unused)
Undang (unused)	Vinta (unused)	Wilma (unused)	Yolanda (unused)	Zoraida (unused)
Auxiliary list
Alamid (unused)	Bruno (unused)	Conching (unused)	Dolor (unused)	Ernie (unused)
Florante (unused)	Gerardo (unused)	Hernan (unused)	Isko (unused)	Jerome (unused)

During this season, PAGASA used its own naming scheme for the 22 tropical cyclones, that either developed within or moved into their self-defined area of responsibility. Names not retired would be used again during the 2009 season. This was the same list used during 2001, except Bising, Dante, Nando, Pepeng, Ramil, Santi, Tino, Undang, Yolanda, Zoraida, Ernie, Florante, Gerardo, Hernan and Jerome, which replaced Barok, Darna, Nanang, Pabling, Roleta, Sibak, Talahib, Ubbeng, Yaning, Zuma, Ekis, Fuerza, Gimbal, Hampas, and Juego. The names Dante, Nando and Pepeng were used for the first time this year; Bising was previously included in the old lists.

=== Retirement ===
Following the season, the ESCAP/WMO Typhoon Committee would retire Matsa, Nabi, and Longwang from the naming lists. They would be replaced by Pakhar, Doksuri, and Haikui for future seasons. No PAGASA names were retired this year, although the unused name Undang was later changed to Urduja, as it was already retired in 1984.

== Season effects ==
This table summarizes all the systems that developed within or moved into the North Pacific Ocean, to the west of the International Date Line during 2005. The tables also provide an overview of a system's intensity, duration, land areas affected and any deaths or damages associated with the system.

Name	Dates	Peak intensity			Areas affected	Damage (USD)	Deaths	Ref(s).
Name	Dates	Category	Wind speed	Pressure	Areas affected	Damage (USD)	Deaths	Ref(s).
Kulap	January 13–19	Severe tropical storm	95 km/h (59 mph)	985 hPa (29.09 inHg)	Caroline Islands	None	None	
Roke (Auring)	March 13–19	Severe tropical storm	100 km/h (62 mph)	980 hPa (28.94 inHg)	Caroline Islands, Philippines	$166,000	7	
Sonca (Bising)	April 21–27	Very strong typhoon	165 km/h (103 mph)	935 hPa (27.61 inHg)	Caroline Islands	None	None	
Crising	May 16–17	Tropical depression	Not specified	1,008 hPa (29.77 inHg)	Philippines	None	None	
Nesat (Dante)	May 29 – June 11	Very strong typhoon	175 km/h (109 mph)	930 hPa (27.46 inHg)	Caroline Islands	None	None	
Emong	July 4–7	Tropical depression	Not specified	1,004 hPa (29.65 inHg)	Philippines, China	None	None	
Haitang (Feria)	July 10–21	Violent typhoon	195 km/h (121 mph)	920 hPa (27.17 inHg)	Mariana Islands, Ryukyu Islands, Taiwan, China	$1.1 billion	20	
Nalgae	July 18–24	Tropical storm	85 km/h (53 mph)	990 hPa (29.23 inHg)	None	None	None	
Banyan	July 20–27	Severe tropical storm	100 km/h (62 mph)	975 hPa (28.79 inHg)	Japan	None	None	
Washi	July 28–31	Tropical storm	85 km/h (53 mph)	985 hPa (29.09 inHg)	South China, Vietnam	None	None	
Matsa (Gorio)	July 30 – August 8	Typhoon	150 km/h (93 mph)	950 hPa (28.05 inHg)	Taiwan, China, Korea	$2.23 billion	25	
TD	August 9–12	Tropical depression	Not specified	996 hPa (29.41 inHg)	China, Vietnam, Laos	Unknown	13	
Sanvu (Huaning)	August 9–14	Severe tropical storm	95 km/h (59 mph)	985 hPa (29.09 inHg)	Philippines, Taiwan, China	None	36	
Guchol	August 18–25	Severe tropical storm	100 km/h (62 mph)	980 hPa (28.94 inHg)	None	None	None	
Mawar	August 19–27	Very strong typhoon	175 km/h (109 mph)	930 hPa (27.46 inHg)	Japan	None	1	
Talim (Isang)	August 25 – September 2	Very strong typhoon	175 km/h (109 mph)	925 hPa (27.32 inHg)	Taiwan, China	$1.59 billion	172	
TD	August 27–31	Tropical depression	Not specified	1,000 hPa (29.53 inHg)	China, Vietnam, Laos	$1.26 million	7	
Nabi (Jolina)	August 28 – September 8	Very strong typhoon	175 km/h (109 mph)	925 hPa (27.32 inHg)	Caroline Islands, Mariana Islands, Korea, Japan, Russian Far East, Alaska	$972 million	35	
Khanun (Kiko)	September 6–12	Very strong typhoon	155 km/h (96 mph)	945 hPa (27.91 inHg)	Caroline Islands, Taiwan, China, Korea	$1.22 billion	16	
TD	September 11–14	Tropical depression	Not specified	998 hPa (29.47 inHg)	Vietnam, Cambodia, Thailand	None	None	
TD	September 15–16	Tropical depression	Not specified	1,004 hPa (29.65 inHg)	Philippines	None	None	
Vicente	September 16–19	Tropical storm	85 km/h (53 mph)	985 hPa (29.09 inHg)	Philippines, China, Vietnam, Laos, Thailand	$3.48 million	22	
Saola	September 19–26	Typhoon	150 km/h (93 mph)	950 hPa (28.05 inHg)	Japan	None	None	
Damrey (Labuyo)	September 19–28	Typhoon	150 km/h (93 mph)	955 hPa (28.20 inHg)	Philippines, Taiwan, China, Vietnam, Laos, Thailand	$1.73 billion	179	
Longwang (Maring)	September 25 – October 3	Very strong typhoon	175 km/h (109 mph)	930 hPa (27.46 inHg)	Ryukyu Islands, Taiwan, China	$963 million	149	
20W	October 6–8	Tropical depression	Not specified	1,006 hPa (29.71 inHg)	Vietnam, Cambodia, Laos	None	None	
TD	October 7–17	Tropical depression	Not specified	1,004 hPa (29.65 inHg)	None	None	None	
Kirogi (Nando)	October 9–19	Very strong typhoon	185 km/h (115 mph)	930 hPa (27.46 inHg)	None	None	None	
TD	October 10–12	Tropical depression	Not specified	1,004 hPa (29.65 inHg)	None	None	None	
Kai-tak	October 28 – November 2	Typhoon	150 km/h (93 mph)	950 hPa (28.05 inHg)	Vietnam, China	$11 million	20	
Tembin (Ondoy)	November 7–12	Tropical storm	65 km/h (40 mph)	1,002 hPa (29.59 inHg)	Caroline Islands, Philippines	None	None	
Bolaven (Pepeng)	November 14–20	Severe tropical storm	100 km/h (62 mph)	985 hPa (29.09 inHg)	Philippines	None	None	
25W (Quedan)	December 16–21	Tropical depression	55 km/h (34 mph)	1,000 hPa (29.53 inHg)	Philippines, Vietnam	None	None	
Season aggregates
33 systems	January 13 – December 21, 2005		195 km/h (120 mph)	920 hPa (27.17 inHg)		$9.89 billion	702	

== See also ==
- Tropical cyclones in 2005
- Pacific typhoon season
- 2005 Pacific hurricane season
- 2005 Atlantic hurricane season
- 2005 North Indian Ocean cyclone season
- South-West Indian Ocean cyclone seasons: 2004–05, 2005–06
- Australian region cyclone seasons: 2004–05, 2005–06
- South Pacific cyclone seasons: 2004–05, 2005–06
