= List of South-West Indian Ocean very intense tropical cyclones =

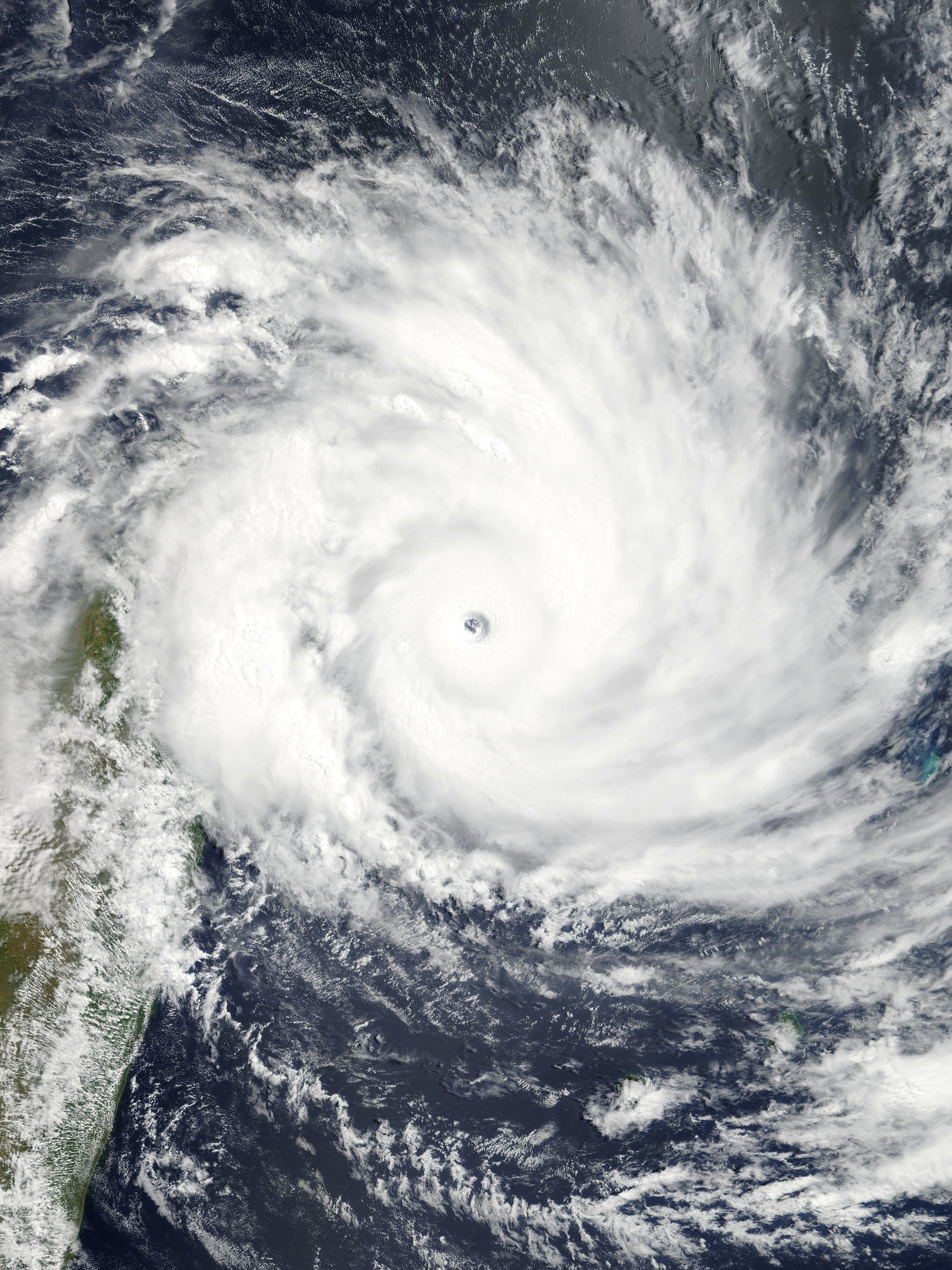
Satellite image of Cyclone Gafilo nearing Madagascar as one of the most intense tropical cyclones in the South-West Indian Ocean

In the South-West Indian Ocean, Météo-France's La Réunion tropical cyclone centre (MFR, RSMC La Réunion) monitors all tropical cyclones. A very intense tropical cyclone (VITC) is the highest category on the South-West Indian Ocean Tropical Cyclone scale, and has winds of over 115 knots (212 kilometres per hour, 132 miles per hour). The most recent very intense tropical cyclone was Vince in 2025.

== Background ==
The South-West Indian Ocean tropical cyclone basin is located to the south of the Equator between Africa and 90°E. The basin is officially monitored by Météo-France who run the Regional Specialised Meteorological Centre in La Réunion, while other meteorological services such as the Australian Bureau of Meteorology, Mauritius Meteorological Service as well as the United States Joint Typhoon Warning Center also monitor the basin. Within the basin a very intense tropical cyclone is a tropical cyclone that has 10-minute mean maximum sustained wind speeds of over 115 kn (215 km/h; 130 mph).

== Systems ==
Name	Duration	Peak intensity		Areas affected	Damage (USD)	Deaths	Refs
Name	Duration	Wind speed	Pressure	Areas affected	Damage (USD)	Deaths	Refs
Lydie	March 6–8, 1973	220 km/h (140 mph)	910 hPa (26.87 inHg)	Réunion	$2 million	10	
Gervaise	February 1 – 10, 1975	280 km/h (175 mph)	951 hPa (28.08 inHg)	Mauritius, Reunion			
Clotilde	January 7 – 21, 1976	250 km/h (155 mph)	980 hPa (28.94 inHg)	None	None	None	
Terry–Danae	January 10 – 29, 1976	260 km/h (160 mph)	955 hPa (28.20 inHg)	None	None	None	
Florine	January 7, 1981	220 km/h (140 mph)	935 hPa (27.61 inHg)	Réunion			
Chris-Damia		240 km/h (150 mph)	920 hPa (27.17 inHg)				
Hudah	April 2, 2000	220 km/h (140 mph)	905 hPa (26.72 inHg)	Madagascar, Mozambique		114	
Hary	March 10, 2002	220 km/h (140 mph)	905 hPa (26.72 inHg)	Madagascar, Réunion		4	
Gafilo	March 6–7, 2004	230 km/h (145 mph)	895 hPa (26.43 inHg)	Seychelles, Madagascar, Mayotte	$250 million	363	
Juliet	April 9–10, 2005	220 km/h (140 mph)	905 hPa (26.72 inHg)	Rodrigues	—N/a	—N/a	
Edzani	January 8, 2010	220 km/h (140 mph)	910 hPa (26.87 inHg)	None	None	None	
Bruce	December 20–22, 2013	220 km/h (140 mph)	920 hPa (27.17 inHg)	None	None	None	
Hellen	March 30, 2014	230 km/h (145 mph)	915 hPa (27.02 inHg)	Comoros, Mozambique, Madagascar	≥$1 million	17	
Bansi	January 13, 2015	220 km/h (140 mph)	920 hPa (27.17 inHg)	Rodrigues	—N/a		
Eunice	January 29–30, 2015	230 km/h (145 mph)	915 hPa (27.02 inHg)	None	None	None	
Fantala	April 17–18, 2016	250 km/h (155 mph)	910 hPa (26.87 inHg)	Seychelles, Tanzania	$3.73 million	13	
Ambali	December 6, 2019	220 km/h (140 mph)	930 hPa (27.46 inHg)	None	None	None	
Faraji	February 8–9, 2021	220 km/h (140 mph)	935 hPa (27.61 inHg)	None	None	None	
Habana	March 10, 2021	220 km/h (140 mph)	935 hPa (27.61 inHg)	None	None	None	
Darian	December 21, 2022	220 km/h (140 mph)	920 hPa (27.17 inHg)	None	None	None	
Freddy	February 19–20, 2023	230 km/h (145 mph)	927 hPa (27.37 inHg)	Mauritius, Réunion, Mascarene Islands, Madagascar, Mozambique, Zimbabwe, Malawi	≥$1.53 billion	1,434	
Vince	February 7–8, 2025	220 km/h (140 mph)	923 hPa (27.26 inHg)	None	None	None	

=== Other systems ===
The Mauritius Meteorological Service classifies Dina in 2002 as a Very Intense Tropical Cyclone. The Australian Bureau of Meteorology estimates that Severe Tropical Cyclone Daryl–Agnielle 1995 peaked with 10-minute sustained winds of 220 km/h (140 mph), which would make it a Very Intense Tropical Cyclone. However, RSMC La Réunion shows that the system peaked with 10-minute sustained winds of 175 km/h (110 mph) which makes it an Intense Tropical Cyclone.

== Climatology ==
Very intense tropical cyclones by month
Month	Number of storms
January	3
February	4
March	3
April	3
December	2

Very intense tropical cyclones by period
Period	Number of storms
1970s	4
1980s	1
2000s	4
2010s	7
2020s	6

== See also ==
- List of Category 5 Atlantic hurricanes
- List of Category 5 Pacific hurricanes
