= Cyclone Ernest =

South-West Indian cyclone in 2005

Intense Tropical Cyclone Ernest
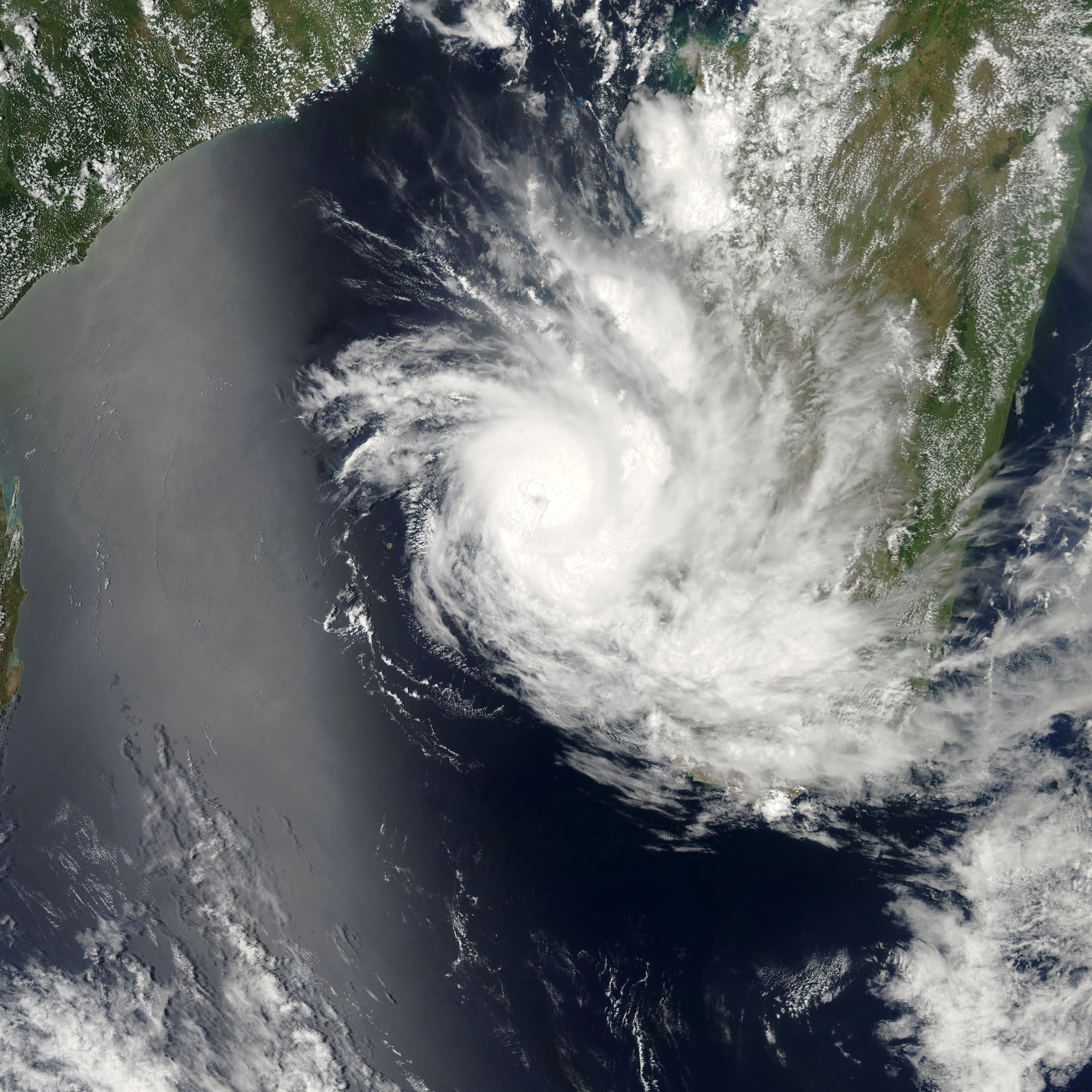
- Cyclone Ernest west of Madagascar

Meteorological history
- Formed: January 16, 2005
- Extratropical: January 24, 2005
- Dissipated: January 25, 2005

Intense tropical cyclone
- 10-minute sustained (MFR)
- Highest winds: 165 km/h (105 mph)
- Lowest pressure: 950 hPa (mbar); 28.05 inHg

Category 3-equivalent tropical cyclone
- 1-minute sustained (SSHWS/JTWC)
- Highest winds: 185 km/h (115 mph)
- Lowest pressure: 944 hPa (mbar); 27.88 inHg

Overall effects
- Fatalities: 78 total
- Areas affected: Mayotte, Madagascar
- IBTrACS
- Part of the 2004–05 South-West Indian Ocean cyclone season

Intense Tropical Cyclone Ernest was one of two intense tropical cyclones in the 2004–05 South-West Indian Ocean cyclone season. The eighth tropical disturbance of the season, Ernest formed from a persistent area of thunderstorms in the central Indian Ocean. It initially moved southwestward, intensifying into Tropical Storm Ernest on January 20 while moving into the Mozambique Channel. After hitting Mayotte, the storm quickly intensified to reach peak winds of 165 km/h (105 mph 10 minute winds) off the western coast of Madagascar. Ernest weakened slightly before striking the southwest portion of that country on January 23, producing widespread flooding and gusty winds. The next day the cyclone became extratropical before dissipating on January 25.

On Mayotte, Ernest produced peak wind gusts of 98 km/h (61 mph). The storm drew moisture away from Malawi, causing a nine-day period of dry conditions. A few days after Ernest struck Madagascar, Tropical Storm Felapi affected the same region and produced further flooding. The combined effects of the storms killed 78 people and left over 32,000 homeless. Widespread crop damage sparked food protests, although the World Food Programme provided an emergency supply of rice to affected residents.

== Meteorological history ==
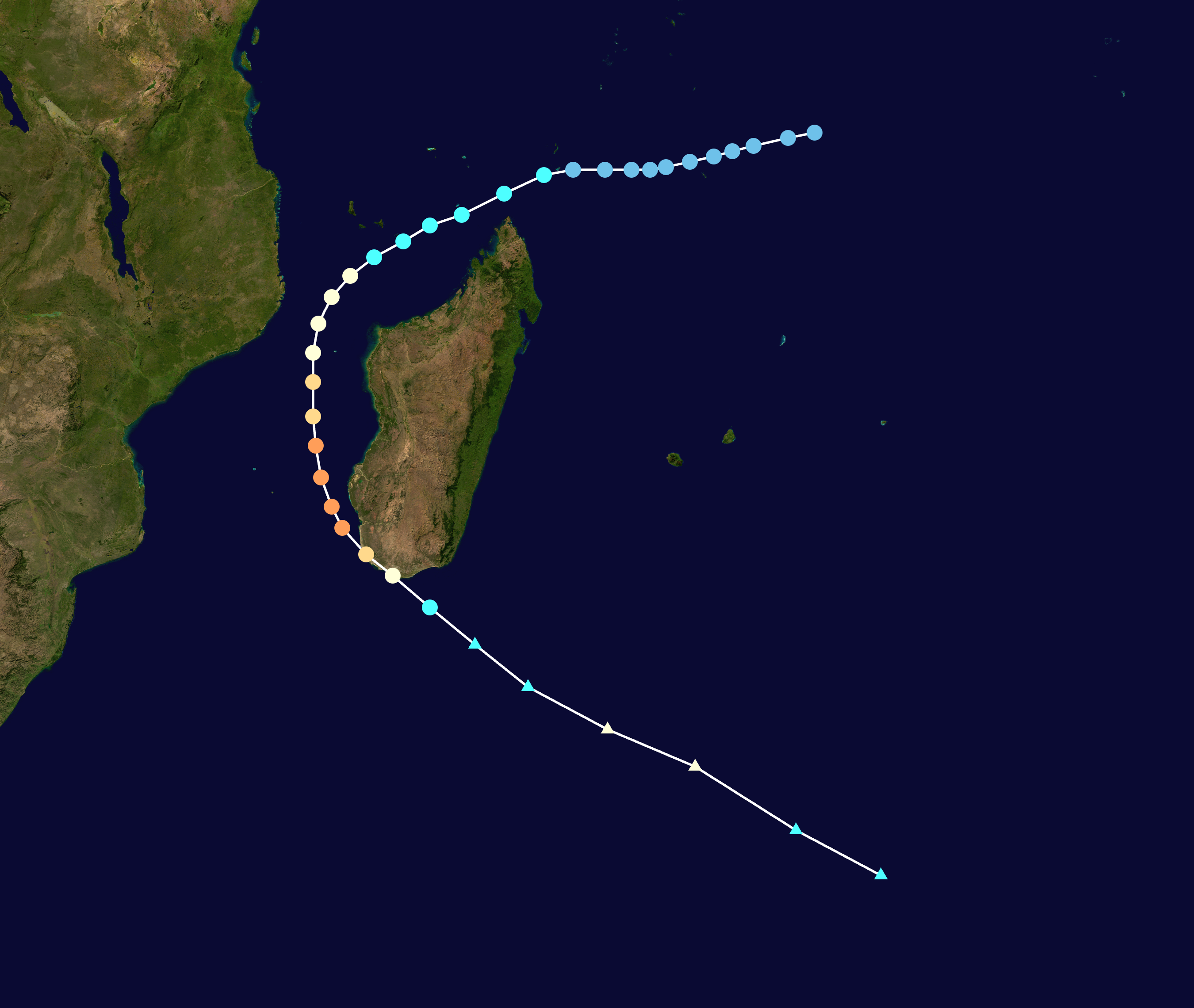
Map plotting the storm's track and intensity, according to the Saffir–Simpson scale Map key Saffir–Simpson scale Tropical depression (≤38 mph, ≤62 km/h) Tropical storm (39–73 mph, 63–118 km/h) Category 1 (74–95 mph, 119–153 km/h) Category 2 (96–110 mph, 154–177 km/h) Category 3 (111–129 mph, 178–208 km/h) Category 4 (130–156 mph, 209–251 km/h) Category 5 (≥157 mph, ≥252 km/h) Unknown Storm type Tropical cyclone Subtropical cyclone Extratropical cyclone, remnant low, tropical disturbance, or monsoon depression

An area of convection persisted on January 16 to the west of Diego Garcia, and that day Météo-France (MF) classified the system as Tropical Disturbance 08. The system maintained thunderstorms over a developing circulation, located in an area of weak to moderate wind shear. It developed outflow and gradually organized, prompting the Joint Typhoon Warning Center (JTWC) to issue a tropical cyclone formation alert on January 17. That day, the MF discontinued advisories after the system briefly halted its development trend. The disturbance continued its movement to the west-southwest, and on January 19 began intensifying. That day, the JTWC classified it as Tropical Cyclone 12S to the north of the northern coast of Madagascar. After continued development, MF upgraded the system to Tropical Storm Ernest on January 20.

After attaining tropical storm status, Ernest entered the Mozambique Channel and turned to the southwest. It developed outflow on opposite sides of the storm, and an eye gradually became evident. While strengthening, Ernest moved over Mayotte and passed southeast of Comoros. By late on January 20, the storm rapidly intensified over warm waters into a tropical cyclone – the equivalent of a 120 km/h (75 mph) hurricane. Around that time, Ernest had turned to the south, along the western periphery of a ridge. On January 22, MF upgraded the storm into an intense tropical cyclone with peak winds of 165 km/h (105 mph 10 minute winds) when it was located off the west coast of Madagascar. At around the same time, the JTWC estimated Ernest attained peak winds of 185 km/h (115 mph 1 minute sustained).

While at peak intensity, Ernest was a small cyclone with gales extending 130 km (80 mi) outward from the well-defined eye. After maintaining peak winds for about 12 hours, the cyclone began weakening while turning to the southeast. On January 23, Ernest made landfall on the southwest coast of Madagascar at Itampolo, with winds estimated at 130 km/h (80 mph). The cyclone accelerated to the southeast across the island and quickly weakened into a tropical storm. Late on January 23, the JTWC issued its last advisory after Ernest began transitioning into an extratropical cyclone. Early the next day, MF declared Ernest extratropical, and continued tracking it until the storm dissipated on January 25 in the southern Indian Ocean.

== Impact and aftermath ==
The storm first struck Mayotte, affecting the island with gale-force gusts for about six hours. Sustained winds reached 78 km/h (48 mph), and wind gusts peaked at 98 km/h (61 mph). Effects on the island were minimal. Cyclone Ernest indirectly affected Malawi, located inland in southeast Africa. The storm's circulation removed moisture from the country and prevented any rainfall from occurring in the southern part of the country during a nine-day period.

In southern Madagascar, the cyclone produced high winds and heavy rainfall. The highest rainfall was a 24‑hour total of 237.2 mm (9.34 in), and the highest wind gust was 180 km/h (110 mph), both of which observed in Toliara. Many fishermen in the area were not aware of the storm's approach, and several of them died as a result. About five days after Cyclone Ernest struck Madagascar, Tropical Storm Felapi struck the same general area, causing additional flooding. The combined effects of Ernest and Felapi killed 39 people, injured 104, and left 214 people missing as of February 25, 2005. Later, the death toll was finalized at 78 in the International Disaster Database. The storms damaged 5,792 buildings, and there were 32,191 people left homeless. The floods damaged about 4,483 hectares (11,078 acres) of crop fields in southern Madagascar.

Portions of the country faced shortages of rice due to crop damage from Ernest, as well as from Cyclone Gafilo in the previous year. This caused prices to increase, resulting in street protests. As a result, the World Food Programme provided 45 tons of rice to affected residents, although persistent flooding disrupted relief work. In general, damage from Ernest and Felapi were less than that from Gafilo in the previous year. Madagascar's National Emergency Centre deployed workers to do search and rescue missions and provide water to storm victims.

== See also ==
- Weather of 2005
- Tropical cyclones in 2005
- Cyclone Dikeledi (2025) – took a similar track
