= Tropical cyclones in 2005 =

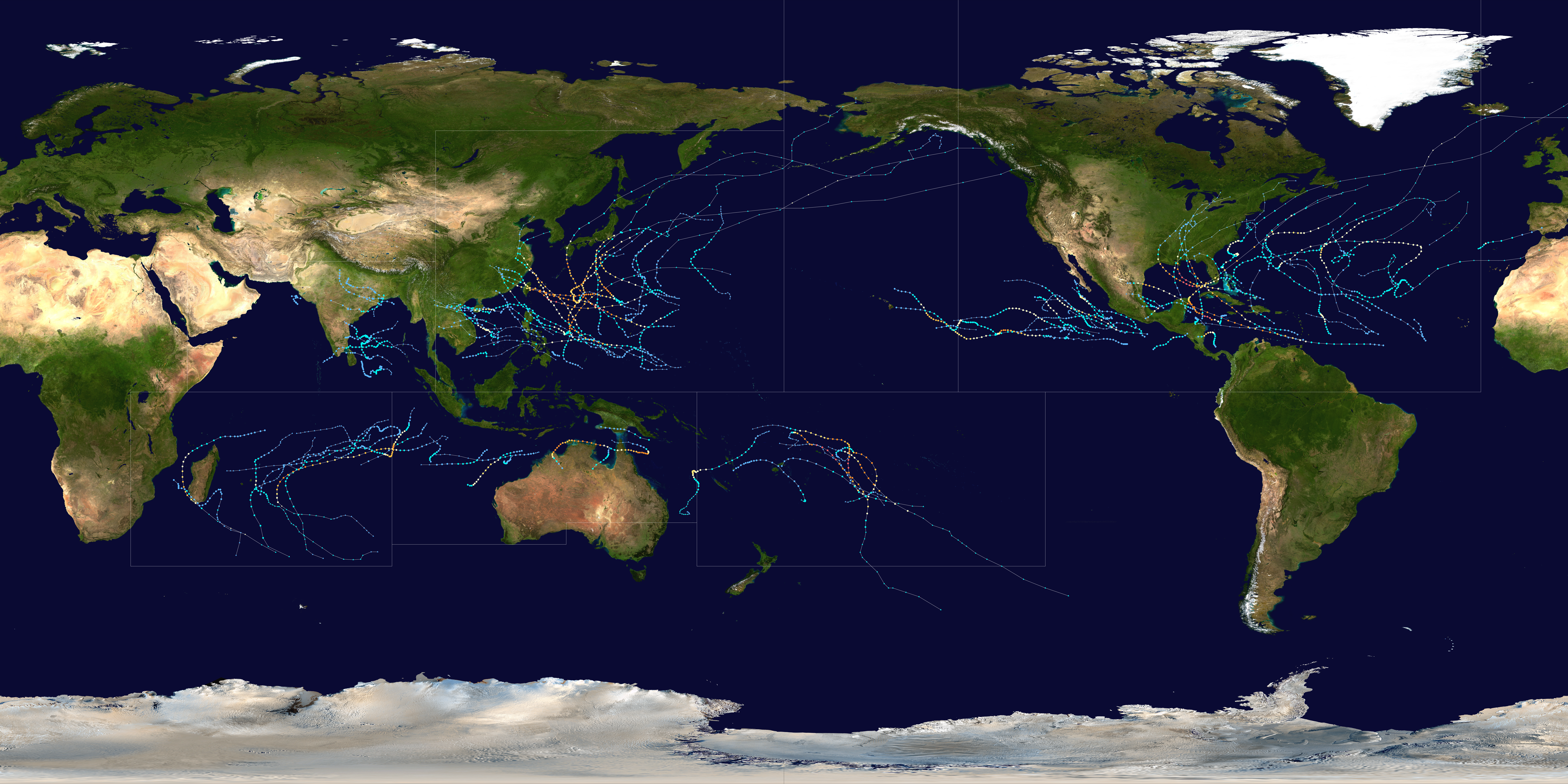
- Year summary map

Year boundaries
- First system: Raymond
- Formed: December 30, 2004
- Last system: Zeta
- Dissipated: January 6, 2006

Strongest system
- Name: Wilma
- Lowest pressure: 882 mbar (hPa); 26.05 inHg

Longest lasting system
- Name: Kenneth
- Duration: 16 days

Year statistics
- Total systems: 137
- Named systems: 93
- Total fatalities: 4,531 total
- Total damage: $189.204 billion (2005 USD)
Related articles
- 2005 Atlantic hurricane season
- 2005 Pacific hurricane season
- 2005 Pacific typhoon season
- 2005 North Indian Ocean cyclone season
- 2004–05 South-West Indian Ocean cyclone season
- 2005–06 South-West Indian Ocean cyclone season
- 2004–05 Australian region cyclone season
- 2005–06 Australian region cyclone season
- 2004–05 South Pacific cyclone season
- 2005–06 South Pacific cyclone season

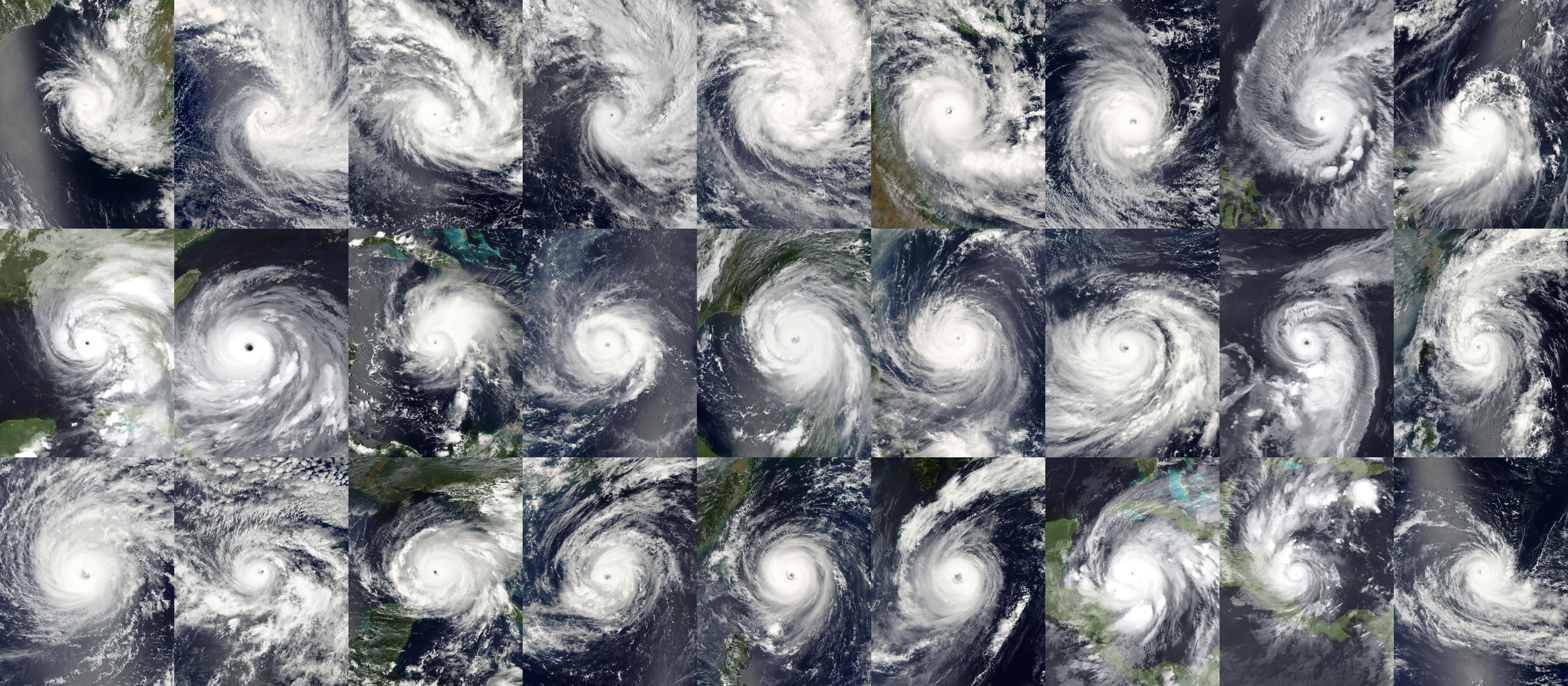
Satellite photos of the 27 tropical cyclones worldwide that reached Category 3 or higher on the Saffir–Simpson scale during 2005, from Ernest in January to Bertie-Alvin in November. Among them, Wilma (third image from the right in the bottom row) was the most intense, with a minimum central pressure of 882 hPa.

During 2005, tropical cyclones formed within seven different tropical cyclone basins, located within various parts of the Atlantic, Pacific and Indian Oceans. During the year, a total of 141 systems formed with 94 of these developing further and were named by the responsible warning centre. The strongest tropical cyclone of the year was Hurricane Wilma, which was estimated to have a minimum barometric pressure of 882 hPa (26.05 inHg). 2005 was above-average in terms of the number of storms. The most active basin in the year was the North Atlantic, which documented 28 named systems.

The Western Pacific had a near-average season with 23 named storms. The Eastern Pacific hurricane season experienced an above-average number of tropical storm intensity systems, numbering 15. Activity across the southern hemisphere's three basins – South-West Indian, Australian, and South Pacific – was fairly significant, with the regions recording 23 named storms altogether, with the most intense Southern Hemisphere cyclone of the year, Cyclone Percy from the South Pacific Ocean basin peaking at 145 mph (235 km/h) and 900 millibars. Throughout the year, 28 Category 3 tropical cyclones formed, including eight Category 5 tropical cyclones in the year. The accumulated cyclone energy (ACE) index for the 2005 (seven basins combined), as calculated by Colorado State University was 899.6 units.

The deadliest tropical cyclone of the year was Hurricane Stan in the North Atlantic Ocean, which killed more than 1,600 people in Central America. Hurricane Katrina, also in the North Atlantic Ocean, was the costliest tropical cyclone of the season and all time (tied with Hurricane Harvey in 2017), causing more than $125 billion in damage after striking the United States, especially New Orleans and its surrounding areas.

== Global atmospheric and hydrological conditions ==
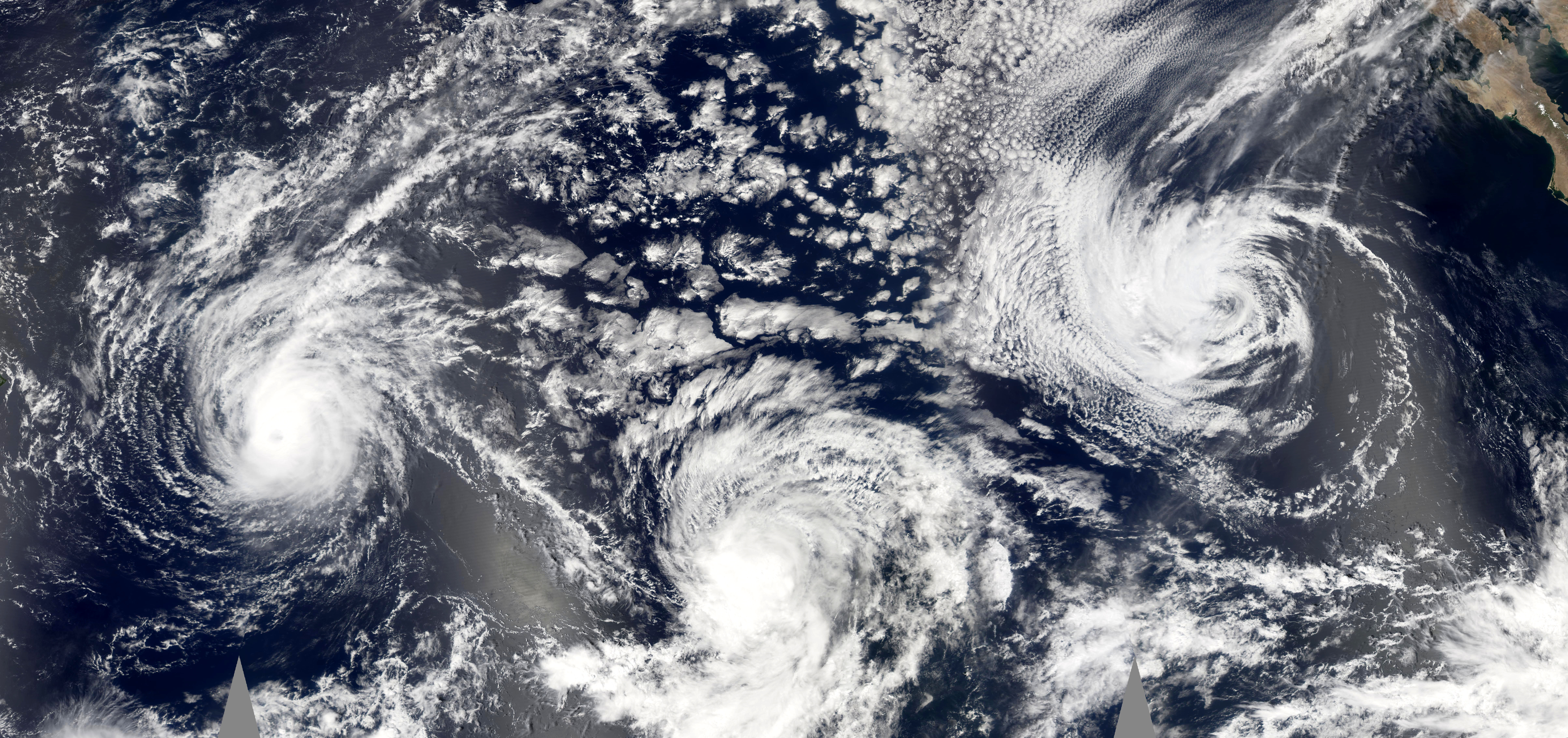
On the Eastern and Central Pacific, three simultaneous tropical cyclones existed on September 22. Jova, Kenneth and Max

The 2005 tropical cyclone season was marked by record-breaking activity, particularly in the North Atlantic, which saw 28 named storms, 15 hurricanes, and 7 major hurricanes, including Hurricane Katrina. This was driven by unusually warm sea surface temperatures, low wind shear, and favorable atmospheric pressure patterns. Globally, the Western Pacific and Indian Oceans experienced near-average activity, while the Eastern Pacific was slightly below average due to cooler waters. The season was shaped by neutral ENSO conditions, warm ocean temperatures, and high ocean heat content, contributing to cyclone intensity in several regions.

A strong La Niña existed throughout 2005.

== Summary ==
=== North Atlantic Ocean ===
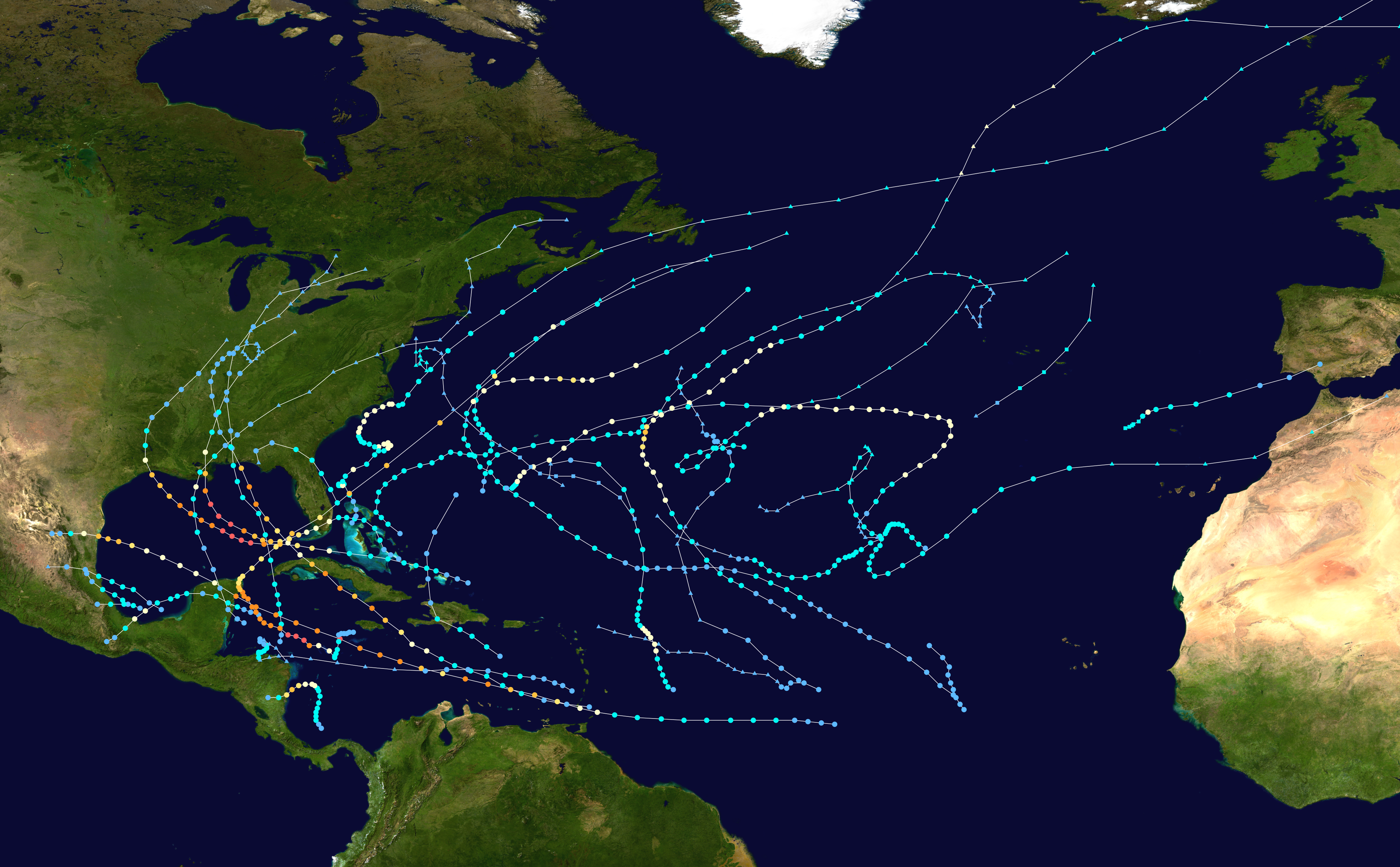
2005 Atlantic hurricane season summary map

The activity was the most active Atlantic hurricane season in recorded history at the time, shattering numerous records, with 31 tropical or subtropical cyclones recorded. The United States National Hurricane Center (Note: The United States National Hurricane Center is the official Regional Specialized Meteorological Center for the North Atlantic basin.) named 27 storms, exhausting the annual pre-designated list and resulting in the usage of six Greek letter names. A record 15 storms attained hurricane status, with maximum sustained winds of at least 74 mph (119 km/h); of those, a record seven became major hurricanes, which are a Category 3 or higher on the Saffir–Simpson scale. The season's impact was widespread and catastrophic. Its storms caused an estimated 3,468 deaths and approximately $171.7 billion in damage. It was the costliest season on record at the time, until its record was surpassed 12 years later.

It also produced the second-highest accumulated cyclone energy (ACE) in the Atlantic basin, surpassed only by the 1933 season. The season officially began on June 1, 2005, and the first storm – Arlene – developed on June 8. Hurricane Dennis in July inflicted heavy damage to Cuba. Hurricane Stan in October was part of a broader weather system that killed 1,668 people and caused $3.96 billion in damage to eastern Mexico and Central America, with Guatemala hit the hardest. The final storm – Zeta – formed in late December and lasted until January 6, 2006.

=== Eastern Pacific Ocean ===
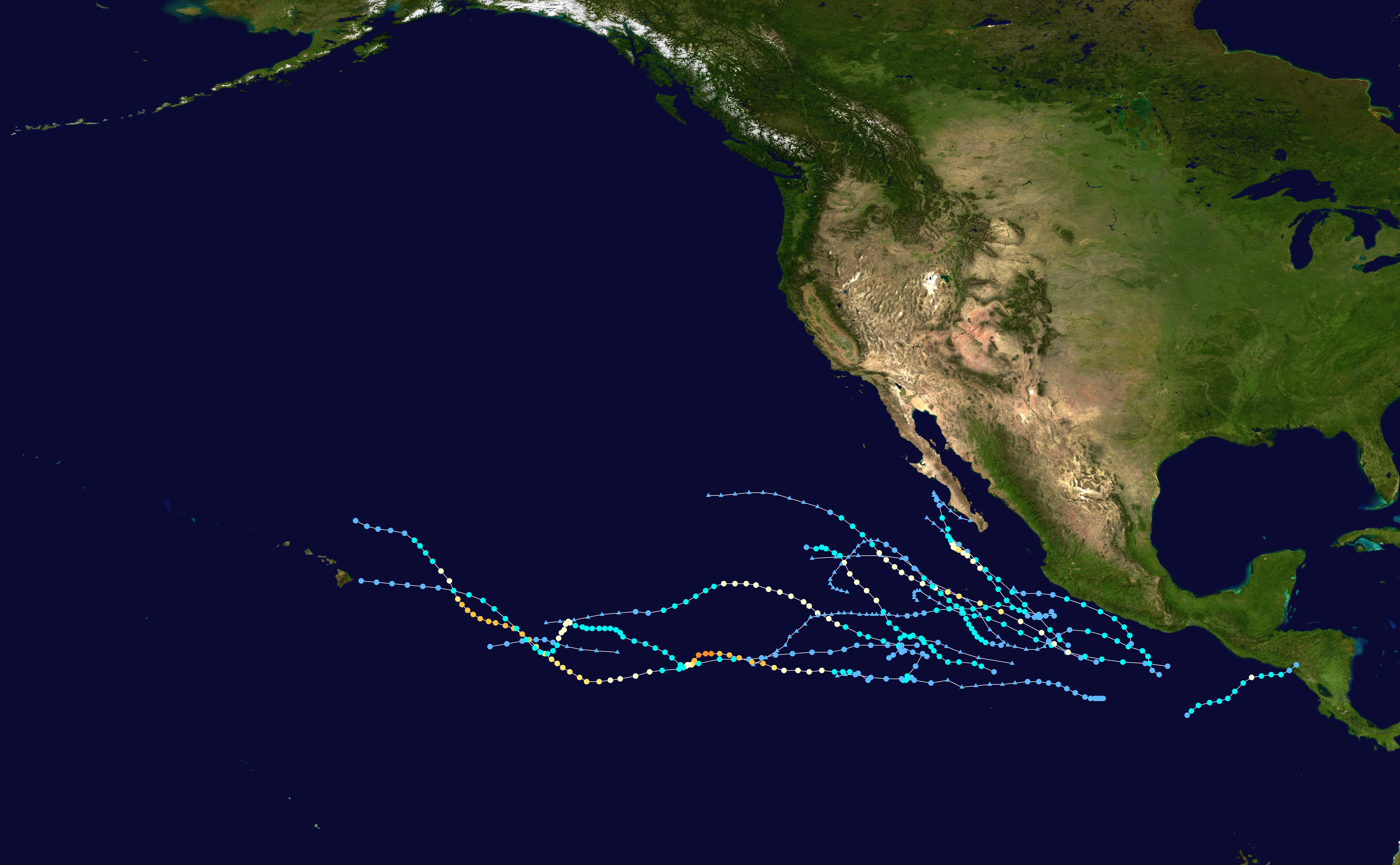
2005 Pacific hurricane season summary map

The activity continued the trend of generally below-average activity that began a decade prior. The season's first tropical cyclone, Adrian, developed on May 17 and reached its peak as a Category 1 hurricane. Named storms are infrequent in May, with one tropical storm every two years and a hurricane once every four years. At the time, Adrian was the fourth earliest tropical cyclone to form in the eastern Pacific since reliable record-keeping began in 1971. Activity throughout the remainder of the season was far less notable, with 16 tropical cyclones, 15 named storms, 7 hurricanes, and 2 major hurricanes. The long-term 1971–2004 average suggests an average season to feature 15 named storms, 9 hurricanes, and 4 major hurricanes. October, in particular, was notably quiet, with the formation of only one tropical depression; only three other seasons, 1989, 1995, and 1996, ended the month without the designation of a named storm.

=== Western Pacific Ocean ===
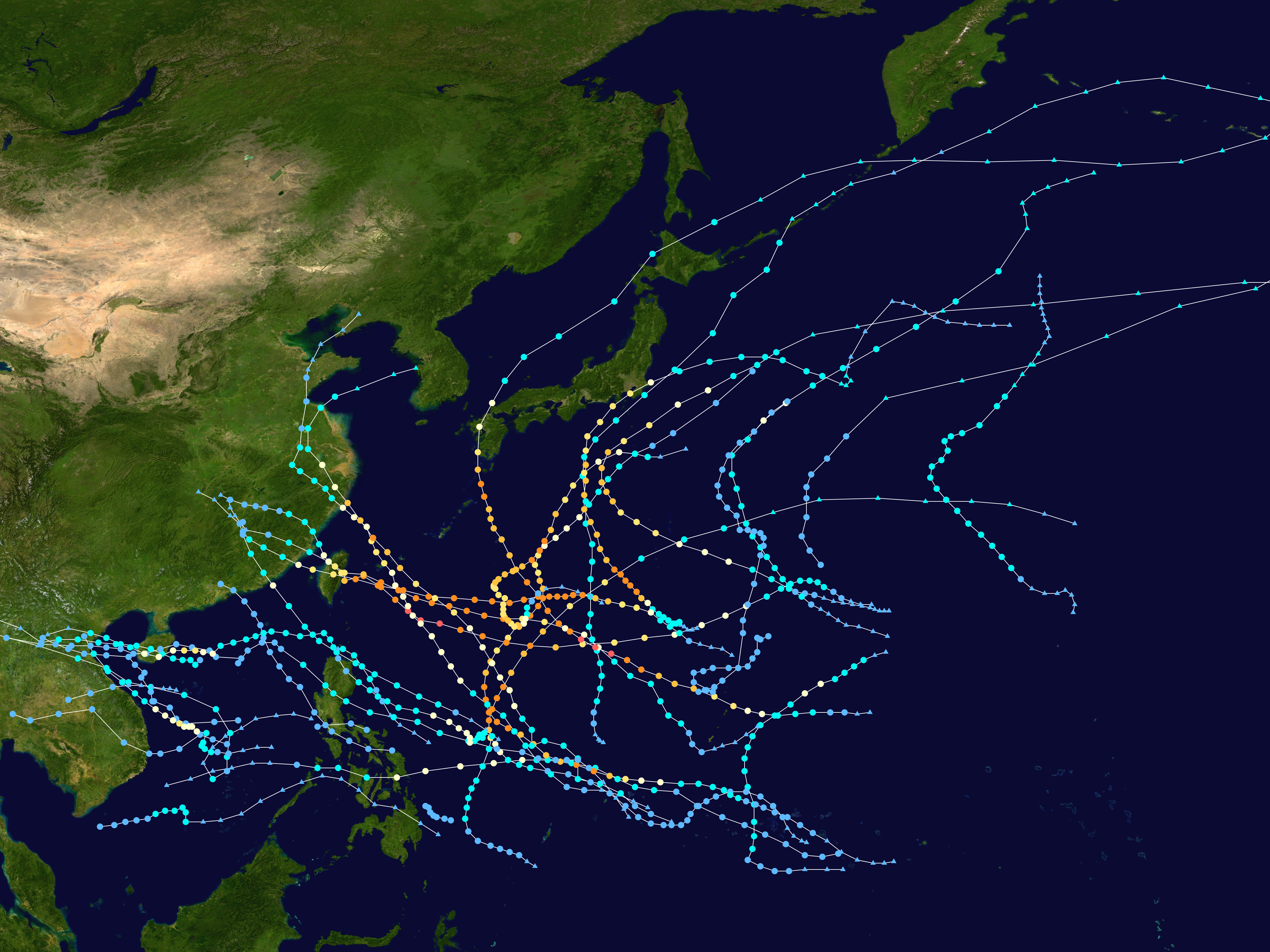
2005 Pacific typhoon season summary map

Although the season was quiet, some typhoons caused extensive damages in many places, especially in China where eight typhoons struck the country. First, Typhoon Haitang became the strongest storm in the basin this year and caused about $1.1 billion in damages in Taiwan and China in mid July. In August, Typhoon Matsa made landfall in Eastern China and caused about $2.23 billion in damages. Later that same month, two powerful typhoons made landfall, causing extreme damage and some casualties.

Similar to Haitang, Typhoon Longwang made landfall in Taiwan and China at a strong intensity causing damages. The season also marked the first time the Atlantic hurricane season was more active than the Pacific typhoon season (the others being 2010 and 2020). However, the 2005 Atlantic hurricane season featured record high activity while the Pacific typhoon season featured near average activity.

=== North Indian Ocean ===
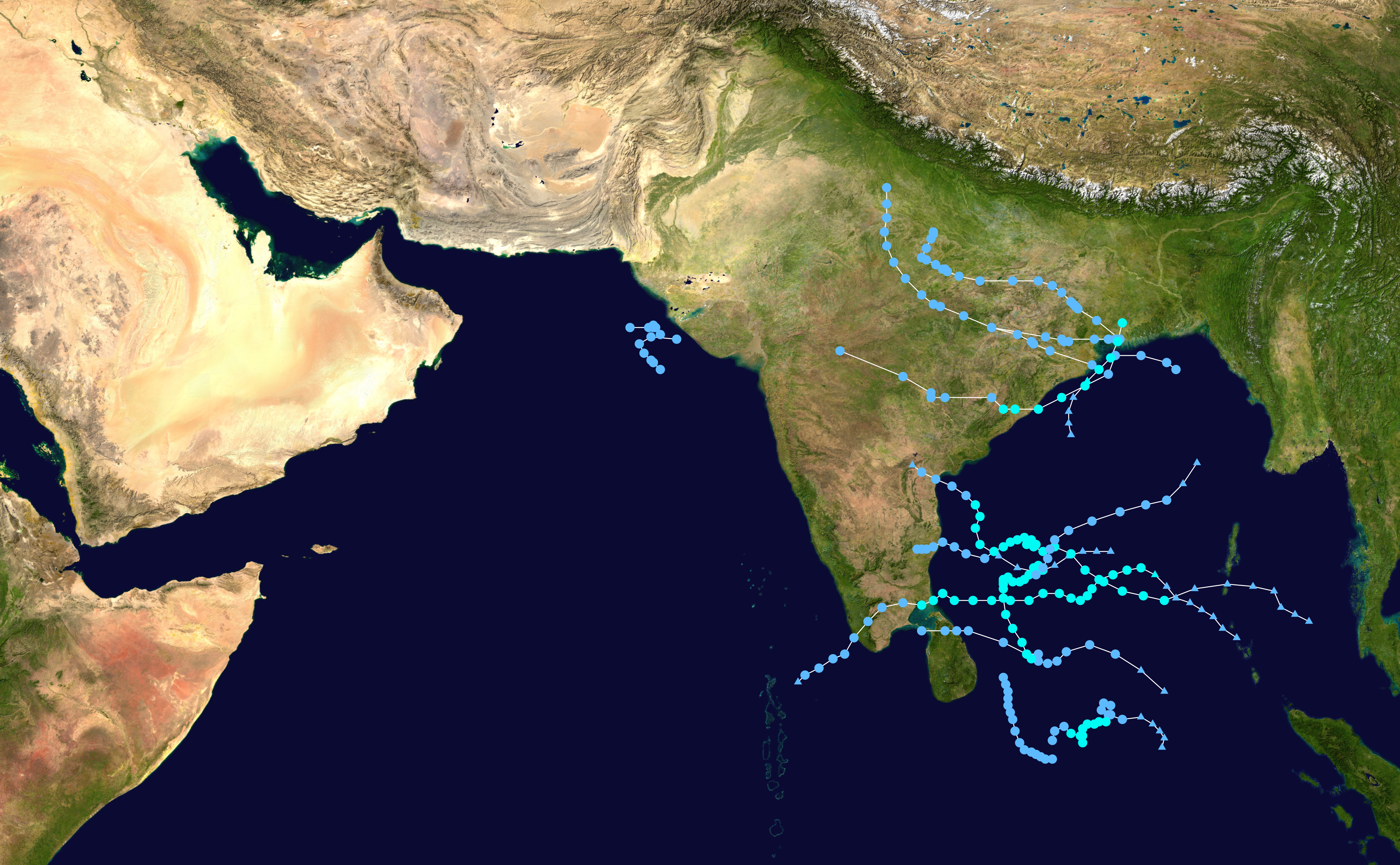
2005 North Indian Ocean cyclone season map

There were a total of 12 depressions during the year, three less than normal, although the highest since 1992. The IMD named four cyclonic storms, a process they initiated in 2004, which was also below normal. No systems strengthened beyond cyclonic storm status. The season was the sixth in a row with below normal activity, based on the seasonal accumulated cyclone energy. Storms generally develop when the monsoon trough is located over tropical waters, with a peak from May to June and another peak in November. The monsoon developed 11 distinct low-pressure areas by the end of September, including five monsoon depressions, and the monsoon season was more active than usual.

== Systems ==
=== January ===
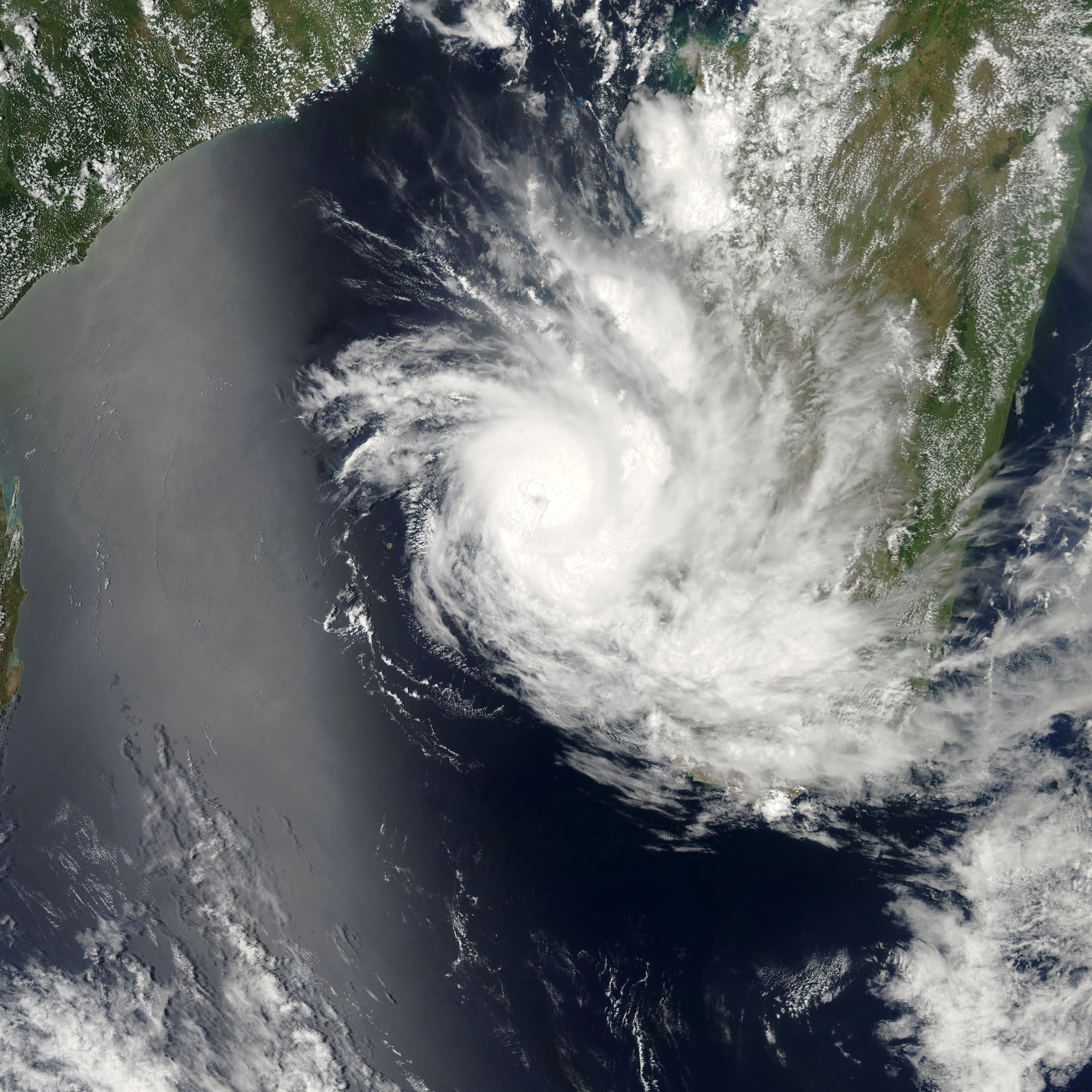
Cyclone Ernest

January was above average featuring thirteen tropical cyclones, of which ten of them being named. The month started off with a tropical low which was short lived in the Mozambique Channel. The month's first named storm Cyclone Sally formed on the 7th in the Australian basin, however it dissipated two days later. The South-West Indian Ocean basin also had two notable storms Cyclone Ernest and Tropical Storm Felapi which both impacted Madagascar. The North Indian Ocean had an early start with a depression and Cyclone Hibaru forming. The Northwest Pacific basin also had an early start with Tropical Storm Kulap forming near the Caroline Islands.

Tropical cyclones formed in January 2005
Storm name	Dates active	Max wind mph	Pressure (hPa)	Areas affected	Damage (USD)	Deaths	Refs
07	January 4–5			Mozambique, Madagascar	None	None	
Sally	January 7–9	95 (60)	985	None	None	None	
01B	January 8–10	55 (35)	1000	None	None	None	
Kerry	January 8–14	140 (90)	955	None	None	None	
10S	January 11–17	55 (35)	998	None	None	None	
Hibaru	January 13–17	65 (40)	1000	None	None	None	
Kulap	January 13–19	95 (50)	985	Caroline Islands	None	None	
Ernest	January 16–23	165 (105)	950	Madagascar	Minimal	78	
Daren	January 17–23	95 (60)	986	None	None	None	
Tim	January 23–25	85 (50)	990	None	None	None	
Felapi	January 26 – February 3	65 (40)	995	Madagascar	None	None	
Lola	January 26–February 2	75 (45)	990	None	None	None	
Gerard	January 29 – February 5	115 (70)	973	None	None	None	

=== February ===
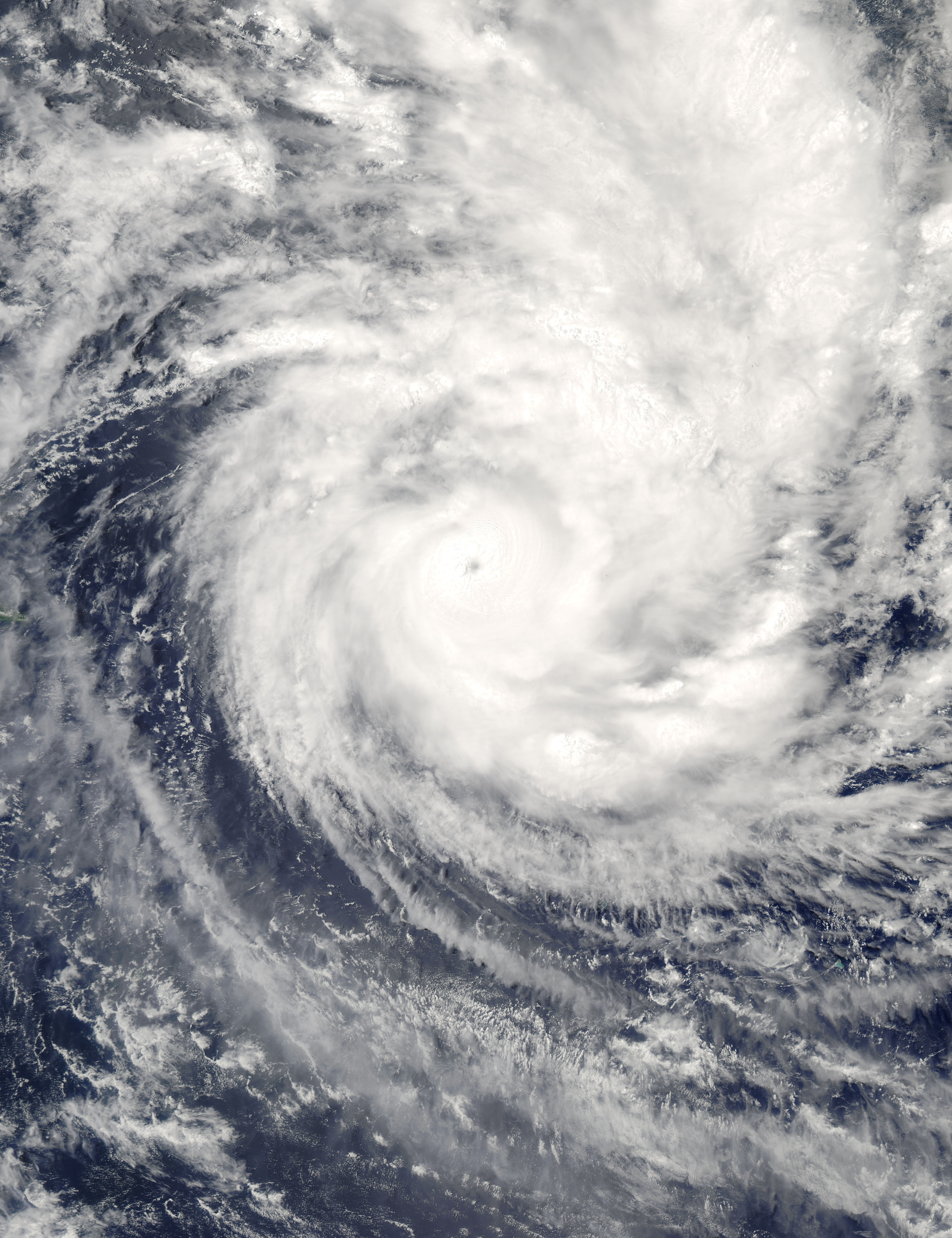
Cyclone Percy

February was slightly below-average featuring nine tropical cyclones, of which seven were named. The Australian region featured Cyclone Harvey and Tropical Low Vivienne. Harvey formed in the Gulf of Carpentaria before making landfall on Queensland and the Northern Territory while Vivienne caused minor oil and gas disruptions in the Timor Sea. The Southern Pacific basin featured seven cyclones of which three of them became Category 5 cyclones. Cyclones Meena, Olaf, Nancy, and Percy all affected the Cook Islands with Percy becoming the strongest storm of the month.

Tropical cyclones formed in February 2005
Storm name	Dates active	Max wind km/h (mph)	Pressure (hPa)	Areas affected	Damage (USD)	Deaths	Refs
Meena	February 1–8	215 (130)	915	Cook Islands	$20 million	None	
Harvey	February 3–8	140 (90)	967	Northern Territory, Queensland	$797 000	None	
Vivienne	February 4–9	65 (40)	990	None	None	None	
Olaf	February 10–20	215 (130)	915	Samoan Islands, Cook Islands	$10 million	None	
Nancy	February 10–17	175 (110)	935	Samoan Islands, Cook Islands	None	None	
Percy	February 24 – March 5	230 (145)	900	Tokelau, Samoan Islands, Cook Islands	$25 million	None	
11F	February 26–27	55 (35)	998	French Polynesia	None	None	
Rae	February 27 – March 6	75 (45)	990	None	None	None	
13F	February 27 – March 4	Not specified	1001	None	None	None	

=== March ===
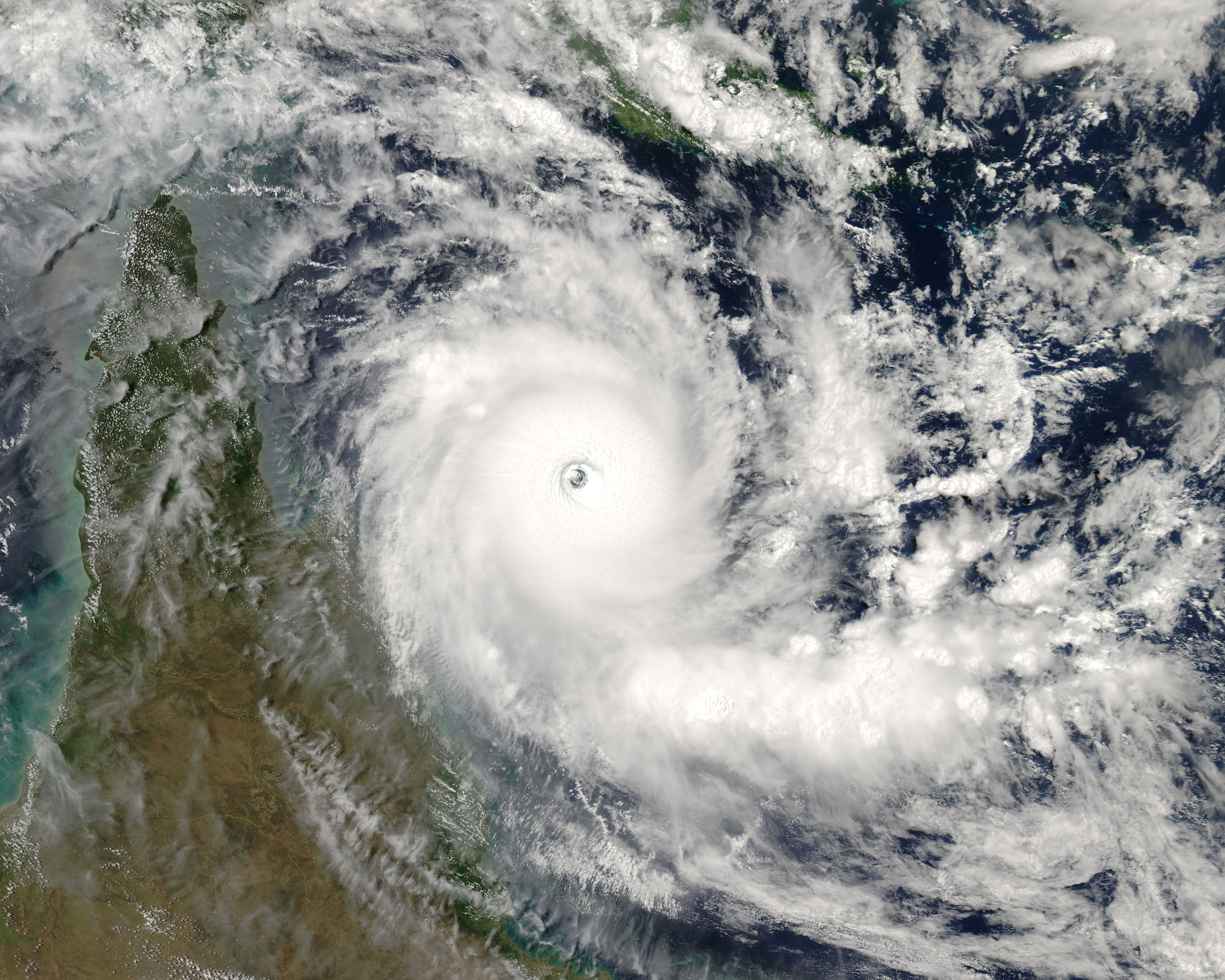
Cyclone Ingrid

March was very inactive, featuring five tropical cyclones with all of them being named. The month started off with Cyclone Ingrid, which formed north of the Gulf of Carpentaria. Ingril was a erratic cyclone which effected much of Northern Australia as a Category 4 tropical storm. The storm made landfall on the town of Nhulunbuy as a Category 5 on the Australian scale. It then made a slow approach on Kimberley before dissipating. While Ingril was a Category 5 cyclone, another storm named Cyclone Willy formed northwest of Australia. Willy only caused minor oil distruption in the Timor Sea but had no effect on land.

The Western Pacific basin featured its second storm Tropical Storm Roke. Roke struck the Philippines as a minimal typhoon killing 7 people. The South-West Indian Ocean featured two storms named Hennie and Isang. Hennie caused minor damage on Mauritius, and Réunion before accelerating towards the southeastern Indian Ocean. Isang on the other hand took a similar route with Hennie but had no effect on land.

Tropical cyclones formed in March 2005
Storm name	Dates active	Max wind km/h (mph)	Pressure (hPa)	Areas affected	Damage (USD)	Deaths	Refs
Ingrid	March 4–16	230 (140)	924	Papua New Guinea, Northern Australia	$14.4 million	5	
Willy	March 8–14	140 (85)	960	None	None	None	
Roke (Auring)	March 13–19	100 (65)	980	Caroline Islands, Philippines	$166 thousand	7	
Hennie	March 19–26	100 (65)	978	Mauritius, Réunion	None	None	
Isang	March 29 – April 6	115 (75)	970	None	None	None	

=== April ===
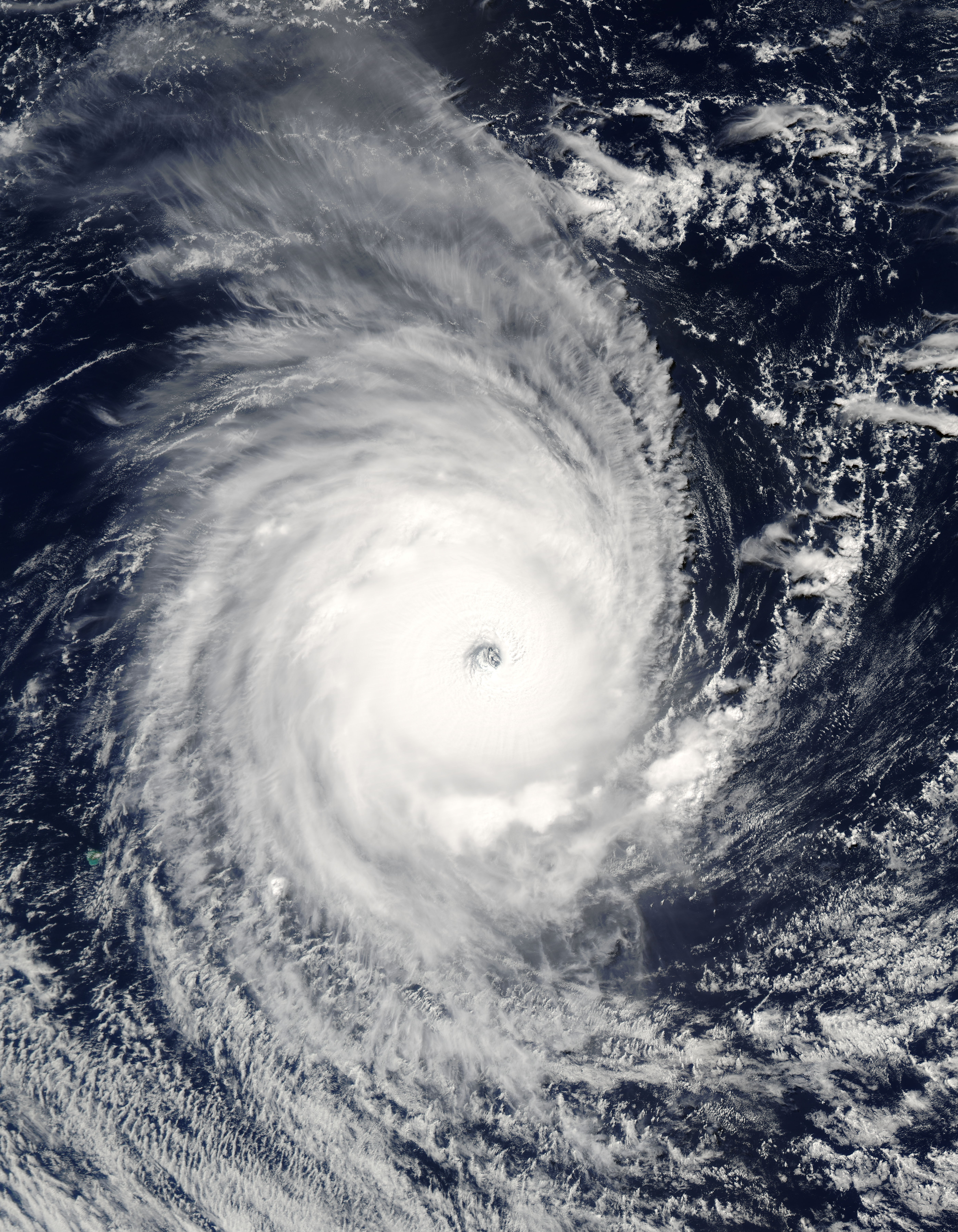
Cyclone Adeline-Juliet

April was average featuring eight tropical cyclones, of which three were named. The month started off with Cyclone Adeline-Juliet which became the strongest storm of the month. The storm was first noted near the Cocos Islands and was upgraded into Tropical Storm Adeline. It then entered the South-West Indian Ocean basin where the storm was renamed Juliet. It then intensified into an Intense Tropical Cyclone until the system weakened and became extratropical. Later 11U formed over the Arafura Sea and made landfall on Papua New Guinea.

11U was the last storm of the 2004–05 Australian region cyclone season. The second named storm was Cyclone Sheila which formed over Fiji. The storm then curved away from Fiji where the storm dissipated shortly after being named. The third named storm was Typhoon Sonca which formed in the Western Pacific. It then intensified into a Category 4 typhoon. Despite its strength, the typhoon stayed at sea and dissipated. The other unnamed storms were rather weak and short-lived as not much information is known.

Tropical cyclones formed in April 2005
Storm name	Dates active	Max wind km/h (mph)	Pressure (hPa)	Areas affected	Damage (USD)	Deaths	Refs
Adeline–Juliet	April 2–11	220 (140)	905	Cocos (Keeling) Islands	Minimal	None	
11U	April 13–15	Not specified	990	Papua New Guinea	None	None	
14F	April 14 – May 1	55 (35)	1000	None	None	None	
Sheila	April 20–22	75 (45)	990	Fiji	None	None	
16F	April 20–22	Not specified	1000	Niue	None	None	
Sonca (Bising)	April 21–27	165 (105)	935	Caroline Islands	None	None	
17F	April 26 – May 1	Not specified	1007	None	None	None	
18F	April 29 – May 1	Not specified	1006	None	None	None	

=== May ===
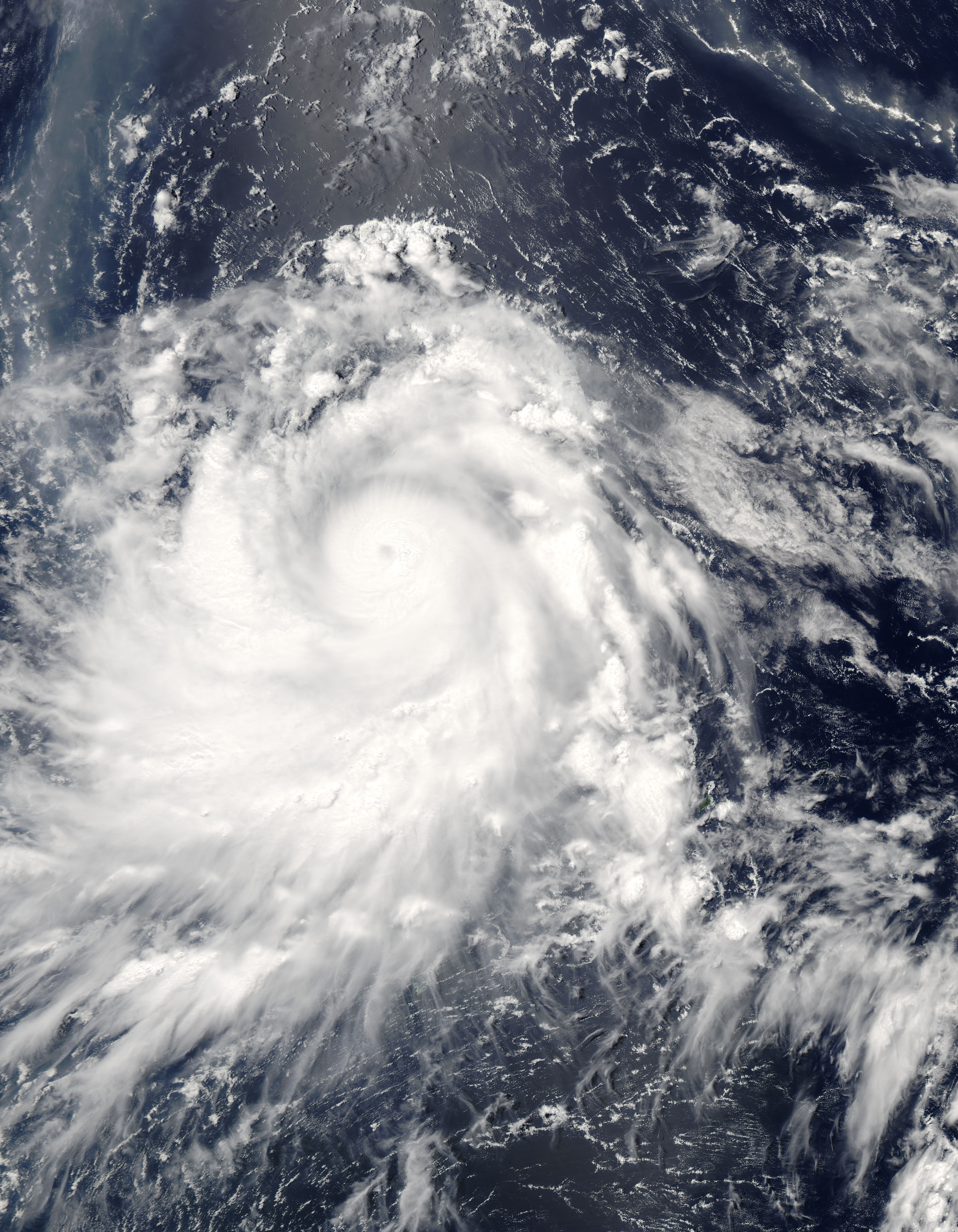
Typhoon Nesat

May was a very inactive season featuring only three tropical cyclones with two of them being named. The month's first storm started in the Western Pacific with the formation of a tropical depression named Crising which was named by the PAGASA. Crising formed east of the Philippine island of Mindanao however, the storm never organized into a tropical storm and did not receive an International name. It then dissipated east of the Philippines. The Eastern Pacific featured its first storm of the year, Hurricane Adrian. Adrian formed very early shortly after the season started and took an unusually northeast route towards El Salvador making it the closest hurricane ever to approach the country. It then made landfall on Honduras before dissipating. The last storm of the month was Nesat which formed near Guam. Nesat then intensified into a Category 4 typhoon before passing south of Japan before becoming extratropical southeast of Japan.

Tropical cyclones formed in May 2005
Storm name	Dates active	Max wind km/h (mph)	Pressure (hPa)	Areas affected	Damage (USD)	Deaths	Refs
Crising	May 15–18	55 (35)	1004	Philippines	None	None	
Adrian	May 17–21	130 (80)	982	El Salvador, Guatemala, Honduras, Nicaragua	$12 million	5	
Nesat (Dante)	May 27 – June 11	175 (110)	930	Caroline Islands, Japan, Philippines	None	None	

=== June ===
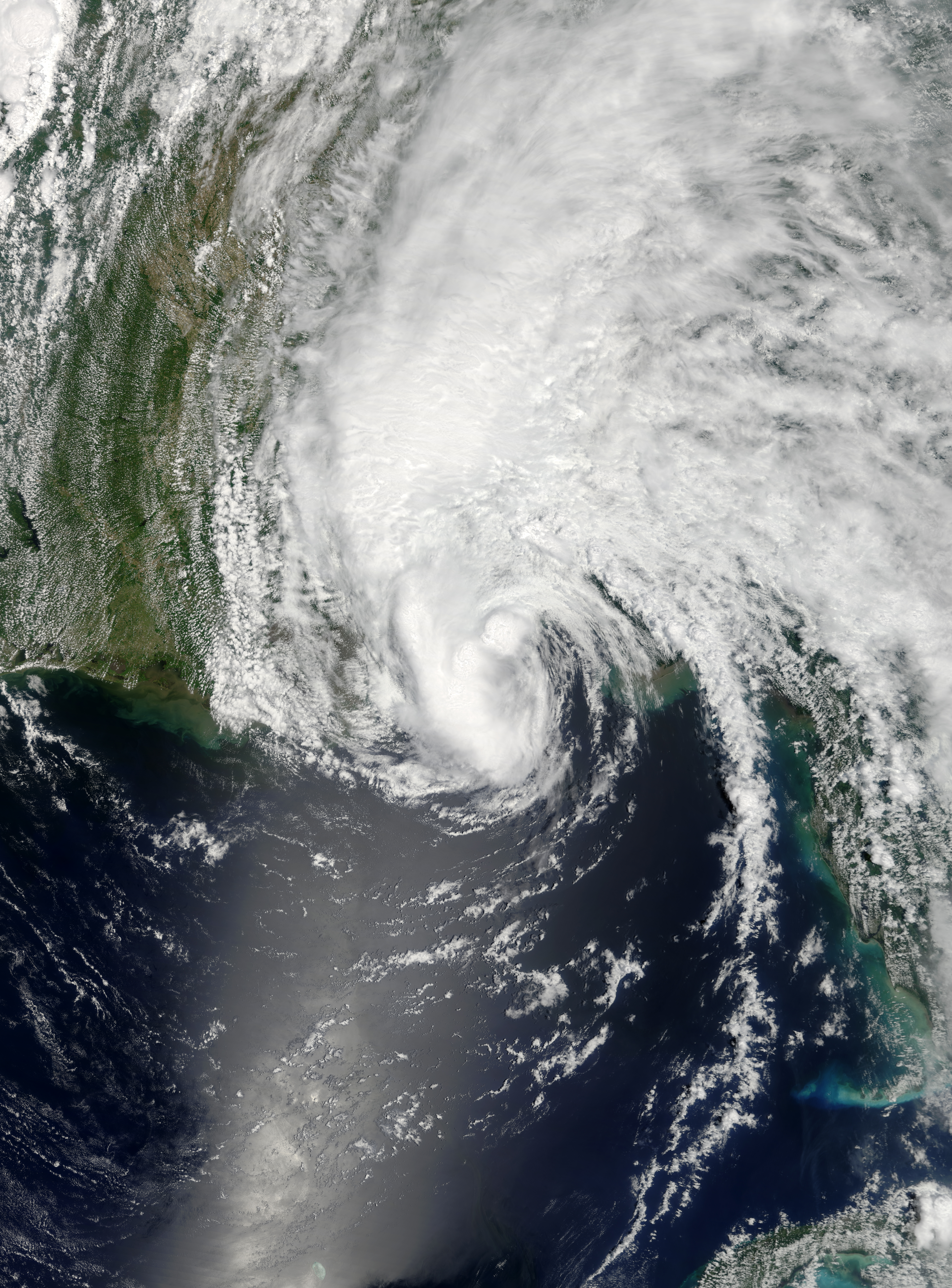
Tropical Storm Arlene

June was an inactive month featuring only six tropical storms with four of them being named. The Eastern Pacific featured Tropical Storm Calvin which formed south of Mexico. However, the storm weren't much of a threat to the country. The Atlantic featured Tropical Storm Arlene and Tropical Storm Bret. Arlene, which became the first storm of the 2005 Atlantic hurricane season and the strongest storm of the month, formed very early north of Honduras. It traveled north in the Gulf of Mexico then made landfall near the Alabama-Florida border. Bret was a short lived storm that made landfall Veracruz in Mexico causing minor damage. The North Indian Ocean featured two depressions with one depression forming over India causing minor flooding.

Tropical cyclones formed in June 2005
Storm name	Dates active	Max wind km/h (mph)	Pressure (hPa)	Areas affected	Damage (USD)	Deaths	Refs
Arlene	June 8–13	110 (70)	989	Cayman Islands, Cuba, Florida	$11.8 million	1	
ARB 01	June 21–22	45 (30)	992	Gujarat	None	None	
Beatriz	June 21–24	85 (50)	1000	None	None	None	
Calvin	June 26–29	85 (50)	1000	Mexico	Minimal	None	
LAND 01	June 27 – July 5	45 (30)	990	India	Unknown	26	
Bret	June 28–30	65 (40)	1002	Mexico	$9.2 million	2	

=== July ===
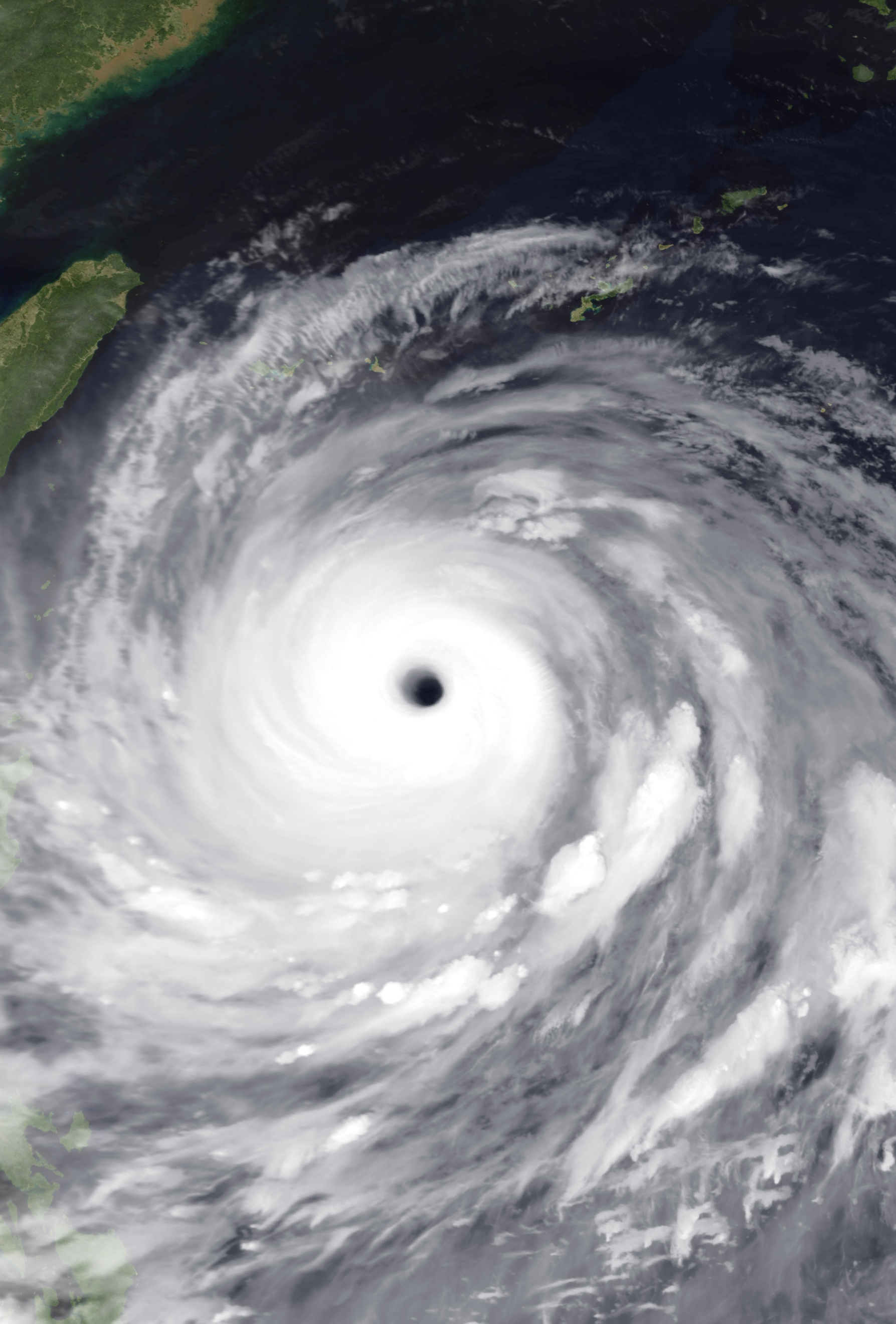
Typhoon Haitang

July was average featuring fourteen tropical cyclones, with twelve of them being named. The East Pacific featured two tropical storms named Dora and Eugene. The two storms made a close approach to the Mexican coastline however, the damage was minimal. The Western Pacific saw the formation of Typhoons Haitang, Matsa and Tropical Storms Nalgae, Banyan, and Washi and Emong. Typhoon Haitang, which became the strongest storm of the month made landfall on China and Taiwan along with Typhoon Matsa which made landfall near Shanghai. Washi made landfall in Vietnam while Banyan made a close approach to Japan but missed the country and became extratropical east of Japan. The Atlantic featured three hurricanes and two tropical storms.

Some notable storms include Dennis and Hurricane Emily. Dennis was an early-forming Category 4 hurricane that traveled across the Caribbean and eventually striking Alabama inflicting severe damage and killing at least 70 people. Dennis was then followed by Emily which also formed near Windward Islands. It then became the earliest-forming hurricane with a Category 5 strength. It was also the costliest Category 5 hurricane to not have its name retired. The North Indian Ocean featured the only non-named storm of the month classified as BOB 02 which was short lived.

Tropical cyclones formed in July 2005
Storm name	Dates active	Max wind km/h (mph)	Pressure (hPa)	Areas affected	Damage (USD)	Deaths	Refs
Cindy	July 3–7	120 (75)	991	Yucatán Peninsula, East Coast of the United States	$320 million	3	
Dora	July 4–6	75 (45)	1002	Mexico	Minimal	None	
Dennis	July 4–13	240 (150)	930	Windward Islands, Greater Antilles, Gulf Coast of the United States, Great Lakes region	$4.26 billion	88	
Emong	July 4–7	Not specified	1004	Philippines China	None	None	
Haitang (Feria)	July 10–21	195 (120)	920	Mariana Islands, Ryukyu Islands, Taiwan, China	$1.1 billion	13	
Emily	July 11–21	260 (160)	929	Lesser Antilles, Greater Antilles, South America, Yucatán Peninsula, Mexico, Texas	$1.01 billion	17	
Eugene	July 18–20	110 (70)	989	Baja California Peninsula	Minimal	1	
Nalgae	July 18–24	85 (50)	990	None	None	None	
Banyan	July 20–27	100 (65)	975	Japan	None	None	
Franklin	July 21–29	110 (70)	997	The Bahamas, Bermuda, Newfoundland and Labrador	None	None	
Gert	July 23–25	75 (45)	1005	Central America	$6 million	1	
Washi	July 28–31	85 (50)	985	China, Vietnam	None	None	
BOB 02	July 29–31	55 (35)	988	India	Unknown	1	
Matsa (Gorio)	July 30 – August 8	150 (90)	950	Taiwan, China, Korea	$2.23 billion	29	

=== August ===
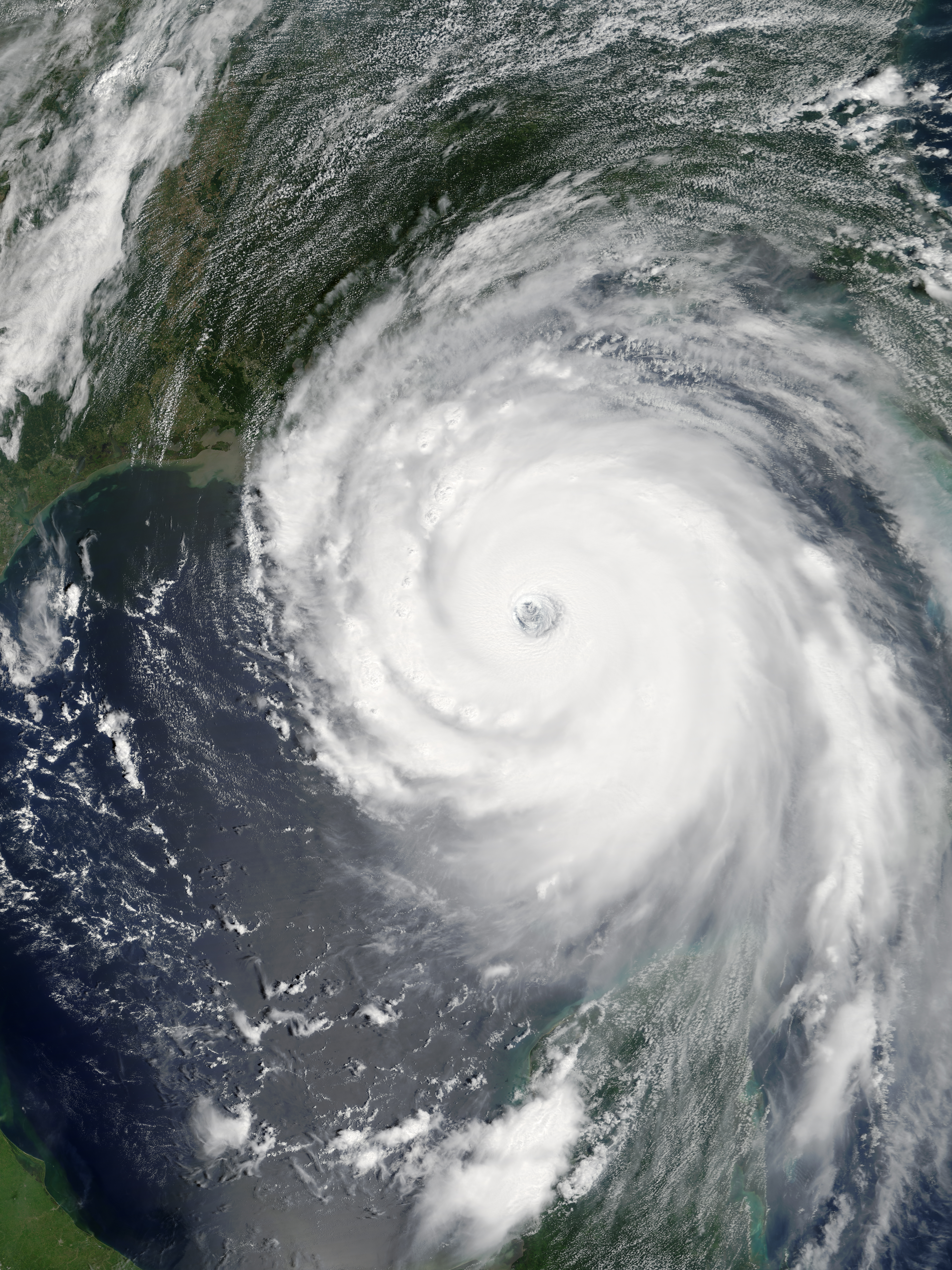
Hurricane Katrina

August was average, featuring eighteen tropical cyclones with fourteen of them being named. The Eastern Pacific featured Hurricanes Fernanda, and Hilary, Tropical Storms Greg, and Irwin along with one depression classified as One-C. The five storms all stayed away from any landmass however, One-C's remnants dropped moderate rain on Hawaii causing minor damage. The Western Pacific featured three typhoons named Mawar, Talim, and Nabi and Severe Tropical Storms Sanvu and Ghuchol. Sanvu and Talim struck China while Mawar and Nabi affected Japan.

The Atlantic featured Tropical Storms Harvey, Jose, and Lee and Hurricanes Irene and Katrina. Jose was short lived but struck Central Mexico causing minor damage. Hurricane Katrina on the other hand struck Florida and intensified into the season's second Category 5 hurricane. Katrina then struck New Orleans causing a large storm surge leaving the city completely flooded. The hurricane killed at least 1,800 people and inflicted 125 billion dollars' worth of damage making it at the time the costliest tropical storm on record until it tied with Hurricane Harvey in 2017.

Tropical cyclones formed in August 2005
Storm name	Dates active	Max wind km/h (mph)	Pressure (hPa)	Areas affected	Damage (USD)	Deaths	Refs
Harvey	August 2–8	100 (65)	994	Bermuda	None	None	
One-C	August 3–4	45 (30)	1008	None	None	None	
Irene	August 4–18	165 (105)	970	East Coast of the United States	None	1	
TD	August 9–12	Not specified	996	China, Vietnam, Laos	None	None	
Fernanda	August 9–16	140 (85)	978	None	None	None	
Sanvu (Huaning)	August 9–14	95 (60)	985	Philippines Taiwan, China	None	None	
Greg	August 11–15	85 (50)	1000	None	None	None	
Ten	August 13–14	55 (35)	1008	None	None	None	
Ghuchol	August 18–25	100 (65)	980	None	None	None	
Mawar	August 19–27	175 (110)	930	Japan	None	2	
Hilary	August 19–25	165 (105)	970	None	None	None	
Jose	August 22–23	95 (65)	998	Mexico	$45 million	16	
Katrina	August 23–30	280 (175)	902	The Bahamas, Florida, Gulf Coast of the United States	$125 billion	1,836	
Irwin	August 25–28	85 (50)	1000	Mexico	None	None	
Talim (Isang)	August 25 – September 2	175 (110)	925	Taiwan, China	$1.5 billion	150	
TD	August 27–31	Not specified	1000	China, Vietnam, Laos	None	None	
Lee	August 28 – September 3	65 (40)	1006	None	None	None	
Nabi (Jolina)	August 28 – September 8	175 (110)	925	Caroline Islands, Mariana Islands, Korea, Japan, Russia, Alaska	$972 million	35	

=== September ===
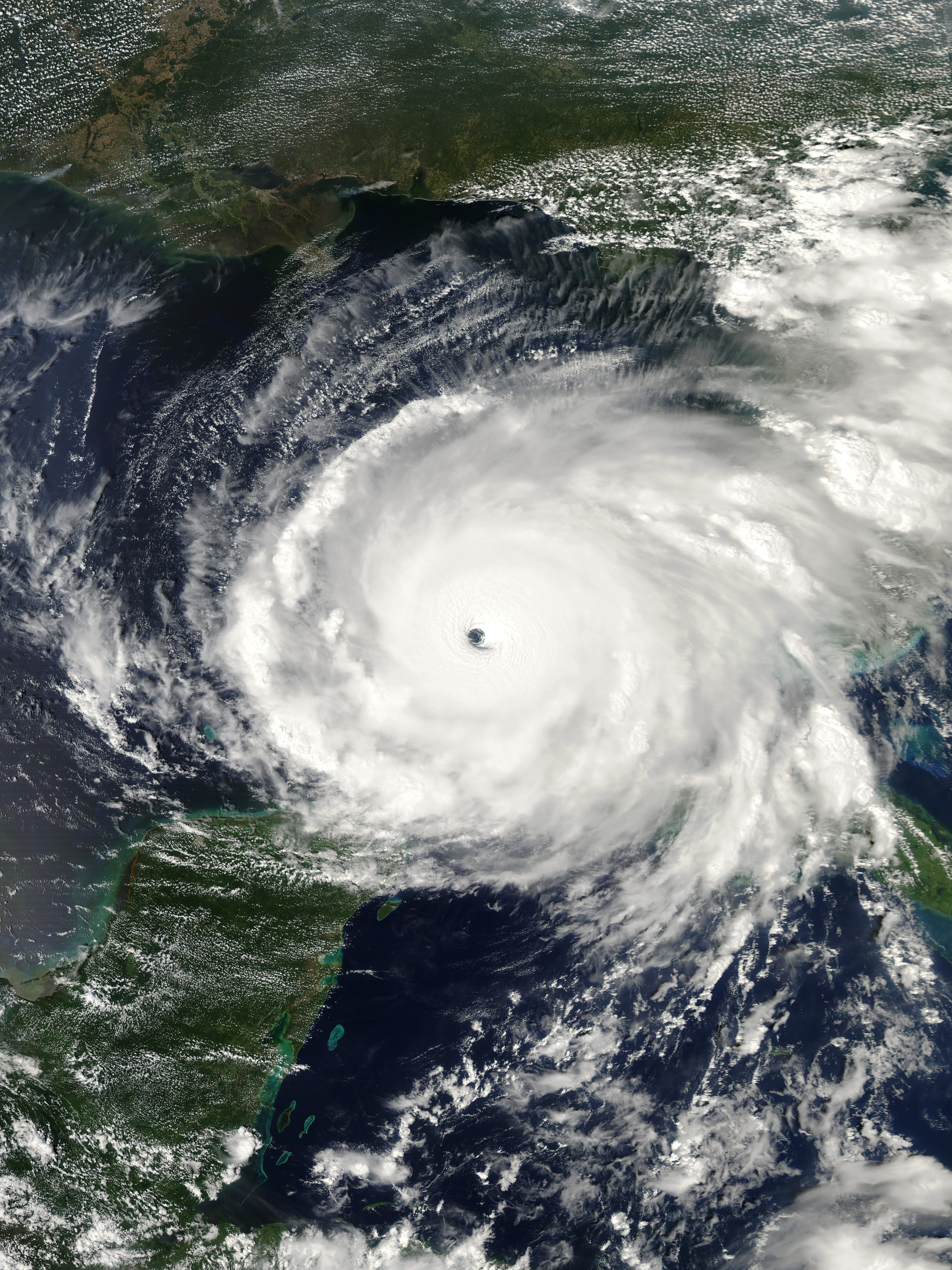
Hurricane Rita

September was very active featuring 22 tropical storms with 17 of them being named. The Eastern Pacific featured Hurricanes Jova, Kenneth, Max, and Otis and Tropical storms Lidia and Norma. Otis became a Category 2 hurricane and threatened the Baja California Peninsula, however, it dissipated before it could reach the peninsula. The other storms on the other hand stayed at sea. The Western Pacific featured some deadly storms mostly being Typhoons Khanun, Damrey, Vicente, and Longwang. Khanun, Damrey, and Longwang all struck China killing more than 350 people. Vincente on the other hand looped in The South China Sea before striking Vietnam killing at least 22 people.

The Atlantic season continued with the formation of Hurricanes Maria, Nate, Ophelia, Philippe, and Rita, and a short lived depression. Maria, affected parts of Norway causing 3 deaths. Nate stayed at sea however it disturbed some Canadian Navy ships heading to the U.S to help in the aftermath of Hurricane Katrina along with Ophelia which affected much of the Eastern United States as well as parts of Atlantic Canada. Hurricane Rita on the other hand became the third Category 5 hurricane in the basin and became the most intense Atlantic Hurricane in the Gulf of Mexico by pressure. Rita then made landfall near the Texas-Louisiana border which was already devastated by Hurricane Katrina.

Rita was the strongest storm in 2005 until it was then beaten by Hurricane Wilma the next month. In the North Indian Ocean, three short lived depressions as well as Cyclone Pyarr formed. Pyarr, being the only named stormed of the month affected India and Bangladesh which resulted in severe damage and severe loss of life.

Tropical cyclones formed in September 2005
Storm name	Dates active	Max wind km/h (mph)	Pressure (hPa)	Areas affected	Damage (USD)	Deaths	Refs
Maria	September 1–10	185 (115)	962	Northeastern United States, Iceland, Scotland, Norway	$3.1 million	3	
Nate	September 5–10	150 (90)	979	Bermuda, Azores	None	1	
Ophelia	September 6–17	140 (85)	976	The Bahamas, Florida, East Coast of the United States, Atlantic Canada, Europe	$70 million	3	
Khanun (Kiko)	September 6–12	155 (100)	945	Caroline Islands, Taiwan, China, Korea	$1.22 billion	16	
TD	September 11–14	Not specified	998	Vietnam, Cambodia, Thailand	None	None	
Jova	September 12–25	205 (125)	951	None	None	None	
BOB 03	September 12–16	45 (30)	992	India	Unknown	6	
ARB 02	September 14–16	45 (30)	996	Gujarat	Unknown	13	
Kenneth	September 14–30	215 (130)	947	Hawaii	None	None	
TD	September 15–16	Not specified	1004	Philippines	None	None	
Vicente	September 16–19	85 (50)	985	Philippines, China, Vietnam, Laos, Thailand	$3.48 million	22	
Philippe	September 17–23	130 (80)	986	Bermuda	Minimal	None	
Lidia	September 17–19	65 (40)	1005	None	None	None	
Pyarr	September 17–21	65 (40)	988	India, Bangladesh	$11.4 million	84	
Max	September 18–22	140 (85)	981	None	None	None	
Rita	September 18–26	285 (180)	895	Hispaniola, The Bahamas, Cuba, Florida, Gulf Coast of the United States, Midwestern United States	$18.5 billion	120	
Saola	September 19–26	150 (90)	950	Japan	None	None	
Damrey (Labuyo)	September 19–28	150 (90)	955	Philippines Taiwan, China, Vietnam, Laos, Thailand	$1.73 billion	180	
Norma	September 23–27	95 (60)	997	None	None	None	
Longwang (Maring)	September 25 – October 3	175 (110)	930	Ryukyu Islands, Taiwan, China	$970.5 million	149	
Otis	September 28 – October 3	165 (105)	970	Baja California Peninsula	Minimal	None	
Nineteen	September 30 – October 2	55 (35)	1006	None	None	None	

=== October ===
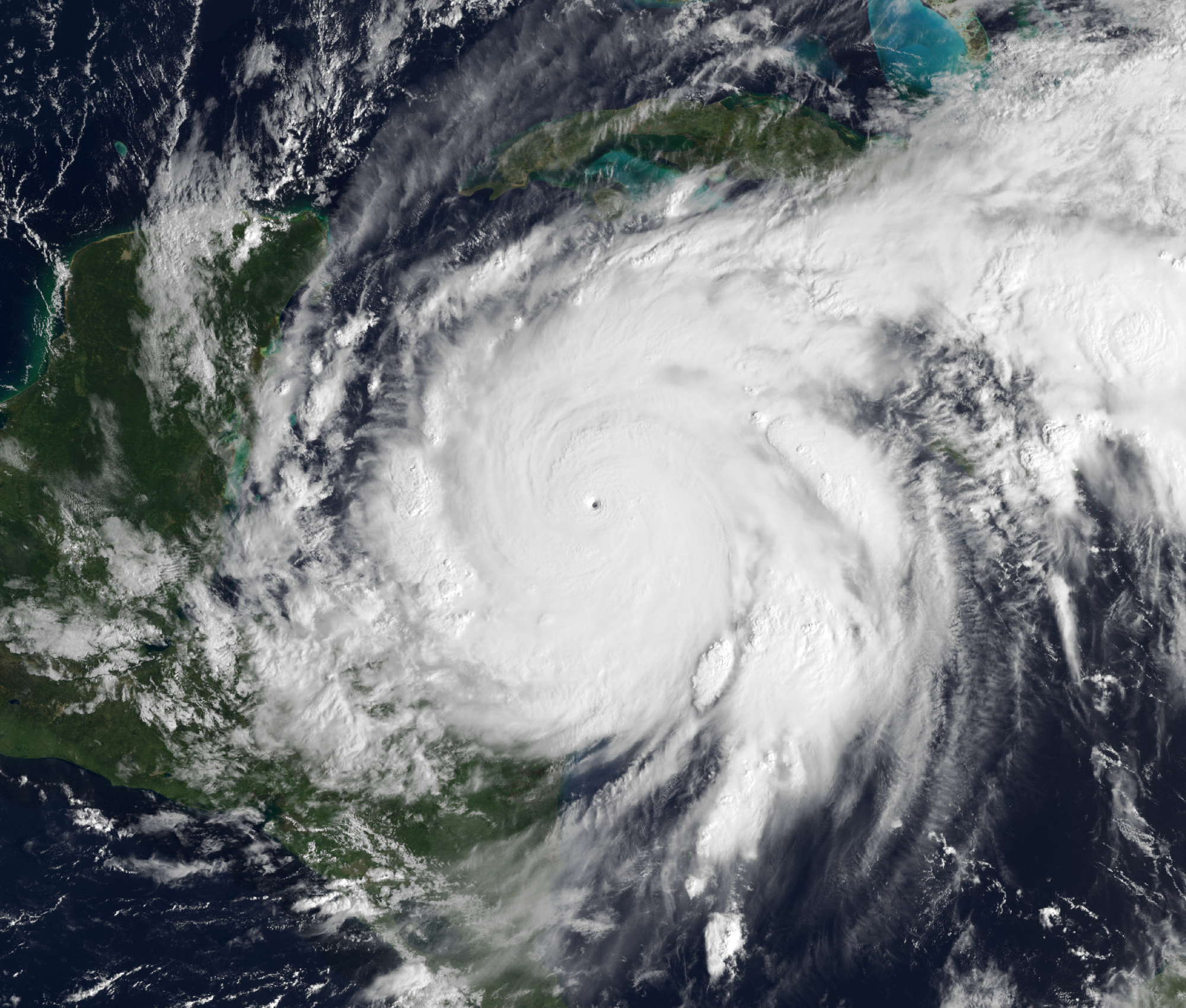
Hurricane Wilma

October was above average featuring sixteen storms with eight of them being named. In the East Pacific a short lived depression formed. The storm officially ended the 2005 Pacific hurricane season. In the West Pacific, Typhoons Kirogi and Kai-tak along with three depressions formed. Kirogi approached Japan but drifted away from the mainland. Kai-tak on the other hand paralleled the Vietnamese coast as a tropical storm before dissipating. In the Atlantic, the active season continued on with the formation of Tropical Storms Tammy and Alpha and, Hurricanes Stan, Vince, Wilma, Beta and along with two depressions and an unnamed subtropical storm.

Stan affected much of Central America and Mexico killing more than 1,600 people. Vince formed out of the unnamed subtropical storm which then intensified into a minimal Category 1 hurricane becoming the most eastern hurricane until the record was broken by Hurricane Pablo in 2019. Hurricane Wilma on the other hand intensified into a Category 5 hurricane within a day with its pressure dropping from 982hPa to 882hPa within a 30-hour period. Wilma became the most intense Atlantic hurricane ever recorded, based on pressure. In the North Indian Ocean, 03B and BOB 04 formed but were short lived.

Tropical cyclones formed in October 2005
Storm name	Dates active	Max wind km/h (mph)	Pressure (hPa)	Areas affected	Damage (USD)	Deaths	Refs
Stan	October 1–5	130 (80)	977	Central America, Mexico	$2.70 billion	1,669	
03B	October 1–3	75 (45)	994	India, Bangladesh	Unknown	16	
Unnamed	October 4–5	85 (50)	997	Azores	None	None	
Tammy	October 5–6	85 (50)	1001	The Bahamas, Florida	$30 million	10	
20W	October 6–8	Not specified	1006	Vietnam, Cambodia, Laos	None	None	
Twenty-Two	October 8–10	55 (35)	1008	Bermuda, New England	Minimal	None	
Vince	October 8–11	120 (75)	988	Madeira Island, Portugal, Spain	Minimal	None	
TD	October 7–17	Not specified	1004	None	None	None	
Kirogi (Nando)	October 9–19	185 (115)	930	None	None	None	
TD	October 10–12	Not specified	1004	None	None	None	
Wilma	October 15–26	295 (185)	882	Jamaica, Central America, Yucatán Peninsula, Cuba, Florida, The Bahamas, Atlantic Canada	$27.4 billion	52	
Sixteen-E	October 15–20	55 (35)	1005	None	None	None	
Alpha	October 22–24	85 (50)	998	Hispaniola, The Bahamas	Unknown	26	
BOB 04	October 26–29	55 (35)	998	India	Unknown	105	
Beta	October 26–31	185 (115)	962	Central America, Colombia	$15.5 million	9	
Kai-tak	October 28 – November 2	150 (90)	950	Vietnam, China	$11 million	19	

=== November ===
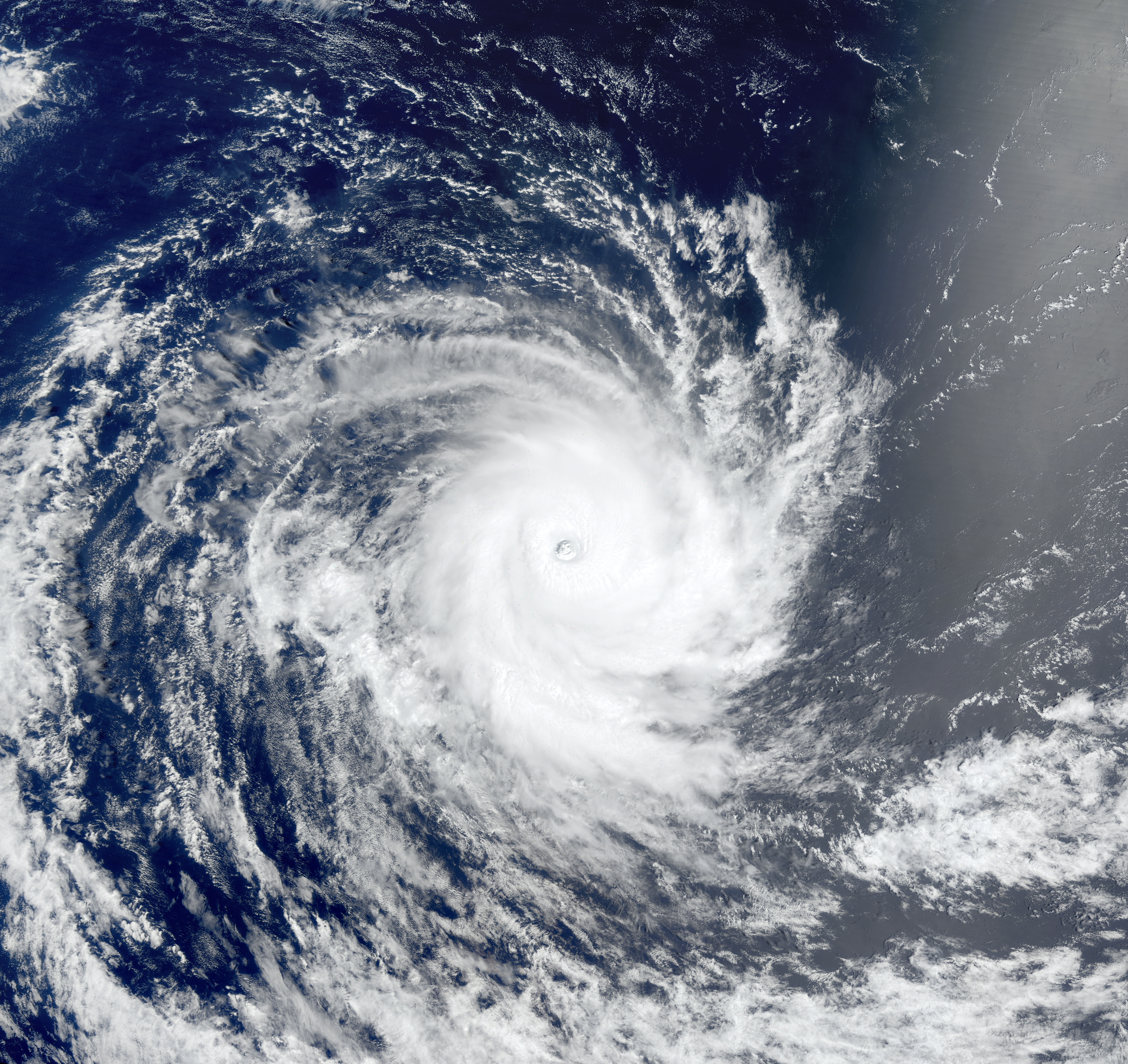
Cyclone Bertie-Alvin

November was average featuring ten storms with seven storms being named. In the Southern Hemisphere, 02R and 01F formed but were short lived. Another notable storm was Cyclone Bertie-Alvin which was given two names. Bertie-Alvin wandered across the Southern Indian Ocean before dissipating. In the West Pacific, Tembin and Bolaven formed with the storms affecting the Philippines. In the North Indian Ocean, BOB 05 and Cyclone Baaz. In the Atlantic, Tropical storms Gamma, Delta and Hurricane Epsilon formed. Gamma affected Central America while Epsilon stayed out to sea. Delta, on the other hand, stuck the Canary Islands which destroyed an iconic sea stack. Delta's remnants then made landfall of Morocco and Algeria.

Tropical cyclones formed in November 2005
Storm name	Dates active	Max wind km/h (mph)	Pressure (hPa)	Areas affected	Damage (USD)	Deaths	Refs
02R	November 5–8	55 (35)	995	None	None	None	
Tembin (Ondoy)	November 7–12	65 (40)	1002	Caroline Islands, Philippines	None	None	
Bolaven (Pepeng)	November 14–20	100 (65)	985	Philippines	None	None	
Gamma	November 14–21	85 (50)	1002	Lesser Antilles, Central America	$18 million	39	
BOB 05	November 20–22	45 (30)	1002	Sri Lanka, India	None	None	
Delta	November 22–28	110 (70)	980	Canary Islands, North Africa, (Especially Algeria and Morocco)	$362 million	19	
Bertie-Alvin	November 19 – December 3	185 (115)	928	None	None	None	
Baaz	November 28 – December 2	85 (50)	998	Thailand, India	$11 million	22	
Epsilon	November 29 – December 8	140 (85)	981	None	None	None	
01F	November 30 – December 2	Not specified	1004	None	None	None	

=== December ===
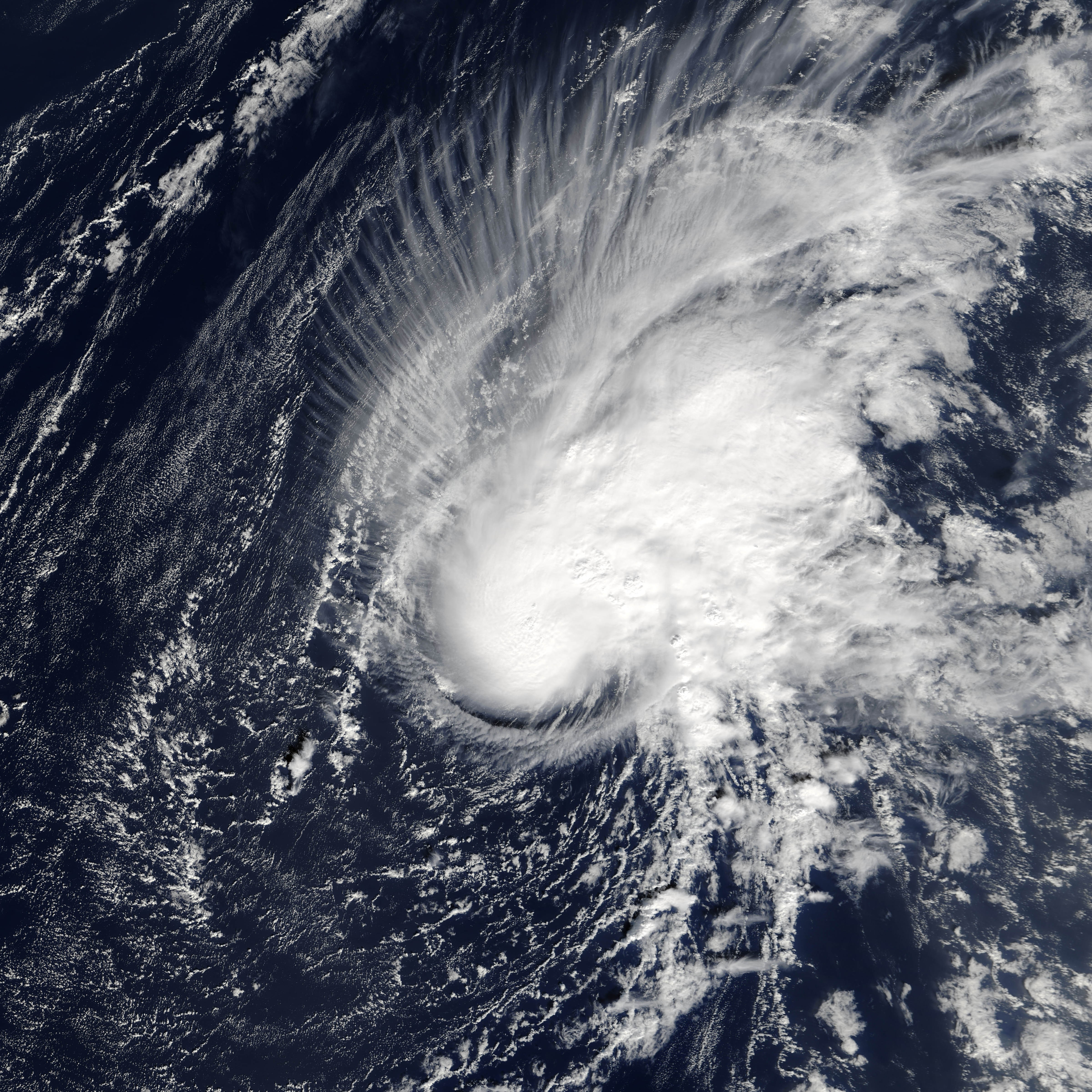
Tropical Storm Zeta

December was inactive featuring six storms with two of them being named. In the Southern Hemisphere, 02F and 04R formed but were short lived. In the West Pacific, a short lived depression that was named Quedan by the PAGASA traveled across the South China Sea and dissipated south of Vietnam. In the North Indian Ocean, Cyclonic Storm Fanoos and BOB 08 formed with Fannos making landfall in Southern India. BOB 08 on the other hand stayed in the Bay of Bengal. In the Atlantic, Zeta formed very late in the season and became the 28th storm of the year. Zeta continued into January 2006 which made it the second Atlantic tropical cyclones to span two calendar years (the other being Hurricane Alice in 1954–55).

Tropical cyclones formed in December 2005
Storm name	Dates active	Max wind km/h (mph)	Pressure (hPa)	Areas affected	Damage (USD)	Deaths	Refs
02F	December 3–6	Not specified	1002	None	None	None	
Fanoos	December 6–10	85 (50)	998	India, Sri Lanka	Unknown	None	
BOB 08	December 15–22	55 (36)	1000	India	None	None	
25W (Quedan)	December 16–22	55 (35)	1000	Philippines Vietnam	None	None	
04R	December 21–23	55 (35)	998	None	None	None	
Zeta	December 30 – January 6	100 (65)	994	None	None	None	

== Global effects ==
There are a total of seven tropical cyclone basins that tropical cyclones typically form in. In this table, data from all these basins are added.

Season name		Areas affected	Systems formed	Named storms	Hurricane-force tropical cyclones	Damage (2005 USD)	Deaths	Ref(s)
Northern Hemisphere
North Atlantic Ocean (Note: The wind speeds for this tropical cyclone/basin are based on the Saffir Simpson Scale which uses 1-minute sustained winds.)		Gulf Coast and East Coast of the United States, Windward Islands, Greater Antilles, Windward Antilles, Lucayan Archipelago, Cape Verde, Azores, Iberian Peninsula, Central America, Yucatan Peninsula, West and North Africa	31	28	15	$179.25 billion	3,453 (23)	
Eastern and Central Pacific Ocean		Central America, Southwestern Mexico, Baja California Peninsula, Hawaii	17	15	7	$12 million	6	
Western Pacific Ocean (Note: Only systems that formed either before or on December 31, 2005 are counted in the seasonal totals.)		Marshall Islands, Caroline Islands, Mariana Islands, Philippines, Japan, Vietnam, Philippines, Taiwan, China, Ryukyu Islands, Korean Peninsula, Cambodia, Laos, Thailand, Myanmar, Aleutian Islands	33	23	18	$9.89 billion	702	
North Indian Ocean (Note: The wind speeds for this tropical cyclone/basin are based on the IMD Scale which uses 3-minute sustained winds.)		South Asia, Northeastern India	14	4	—N/a	$21.4 million	264	
Southern Hemisphere
South-West Indian Ocean	January – June (Note: Only systems that formed either on or after January 1, 2005 are counted in the seasonal totals.) (Note: The wind speeds for this tropical cyclone are based on Météo-France, which uses wind gusts.)	Madagascar	11	6	2	—N/a	78	
South-West Indian Ocean	July – December	—N/a	3	—N/a	—N/a	—N/a	—N/a	
Australian region	January – June	Australia, Papua New Guinea	10	8	3	$15.15 million	5	
Australian region	July – December	—N/a	3	1	1	—N/a	—N/a	
South Pacific Ocean	January – June	American Samoa, Cook Islands, Tokelau, French Polynesia	13	8	5	$10 million	—N/a	
South Pacific Ocean	July – December	—N/a	2	—N/a	—N/a	—N/a	—N/a	
Worldwide		(See above)	137 (Note: The sum of the number of systems in each basin will not equal the number shown as the total. This is because when systems move between basins, it creates a discrepancy in the actual number of systems.)	93	51	$189.2 billion	4,508 (23) (Note: The number in the bracket indicates indirect deaths.)	

== See also ==
- Tropical cyclones by year
- List of earthquakes in 2005
- Tornadoes of 2005

== Notes ==
^{1} Only systems that formed either on or after January 1, 2005 are counted in the seasonal totals.
^{2} Only systems that formed either before or on December 31, 2005 are counted in the seasonal totals.
^{3} The wind speeds for this tropical cyclone/basin are based on the IMD Scale which uses 3-minute sustained winds.
^{4} The wind speeds for this tropical cyclone/basin are based on the Saffir Simpson Scale which uses 1-minute sustained winds.
^{5}The wind speeds for this tropical cyclone are based on Météo-France which uses gust winds.
