= Typhoon Marge (1973) =

Pacific typhoon in 1973

Typhoon Marge (Ibiang)
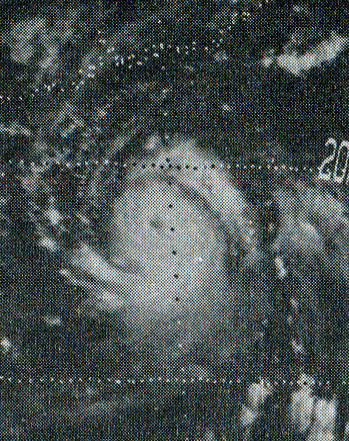

Meteorological history
- Formed: September 10, 1973
- Dissipated: September 15, 1973

Unknown-strength storm
- 10-minute sustained (JMA)
- Lowest pressure: 965 hPa (mbar); 28.50 inHg

Category 1-equivalent typhoon
- 1-minute sustained (SSHWS/JTWC)
- Highest winds: 150 km/h (90 mph)
- Lowest pressure: 964 hPa (mbar); 28.47 inHg

Overall effects
- Fatalities: 903 total
- Areas affected: Philippines, South China, Vietnam, Laos, Thailand, Myanmar
- Part of the 1973 Pacific typhoon season

Typhoon Marge, known in the Philippines as Typhoon Ibiang, was a deadly typhoon that formed in September 1973. The Chinese town of Jiaji in Qionghai, Hainan recorded a minimum central pressure of 937.8 hPa when Marge made landfall. 903 people were killed in Hainan when Marge landed in Ninh Bình and Thanh Hóa provinces in North Vietnam in mid September, 1973.

== Meteorological history ==
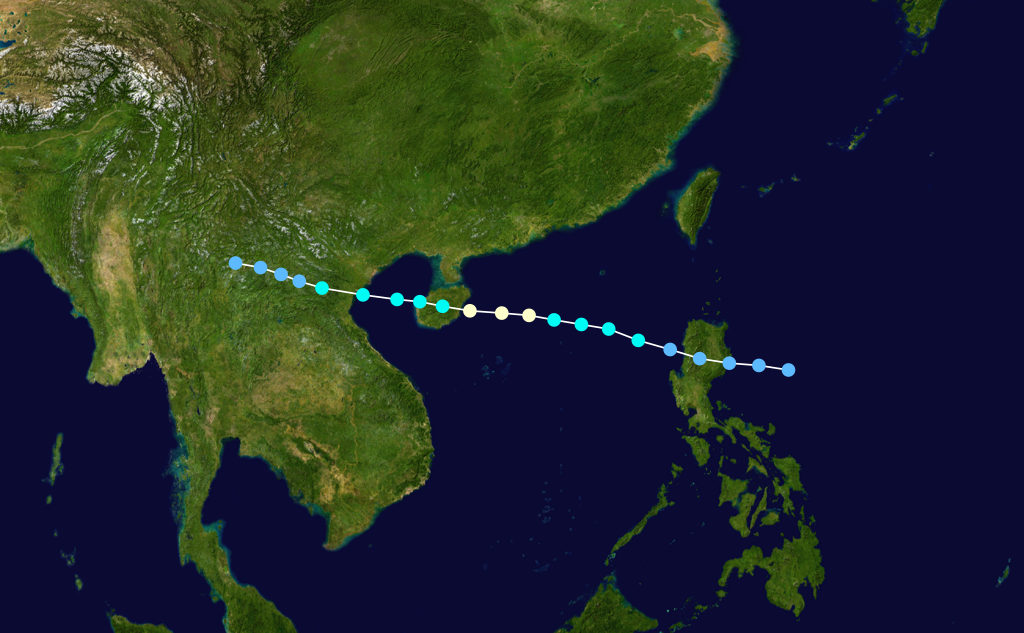
Map plotting the storm's track and intensity, according to the Saffir–Simpson scale Map key Saffir–Simpson scale Tropical depression (≤38 mph, ≤62 km/h) Tropical storm (39–73 mph, 63–118 km/h) Category 1 (74–95 mph, 119–153 km/h) Category 2 (96–110 mph, 154–177 km/h) Category 3 (111–129 mph, 178–208 km/h) Category 4 (130–156 mph, 209–251 km/h) Category 5 (≥157 mph, ≥252 km/h) Unknown Storm type Tropical cyclone Subtropical cyclone Extratropical cyclone, remnant low, tropical disturbance, or monsoon depression

On September 10, 1973, a tropical depression formed in the sea east of the Philippines before moving to the east of Luzon. It made landfall on Luzon with the intensity of a tropical depression on September 11. The tropical depression then moved into the South China Sea and was given the name Marge. On September 12, a U.S. reconnaissance plane detected a hurricane nearby and upgraded it to a typhoon. Due to the storm entering Chinese airspace, the US military stopped reconnaissance shortly after September 13. The final reconnaissance recorded wind speeds at 80 knots. According to reconnaissance aircraft and ship data, the circulation was quite small, no more than 150 miles wide. It made landfall in Boao in Qionghai, Hainan on September 13, and it soon crossed the Beibu Gulf. Marge made its final landfall in Tam Diep Mountains (border of Ninh Binh and Thanh Hoa provinces) Vietnam in late September 14, 1973 and dissipated in the Upper Laos soon after.

== Impact ==
=== Hainan ===
On September 13, Hainan Province was still unaffected by the circulation of Marge and the weather was humid. The weather forecast in a local newspaper, the Hainan Daily, only showed that the wind force would be 7 to 8 on the Beaufort scale on September 14, providing an insufficient warning. By evening, there was still no sign of an impending typhoon.

According to data from the Central Meteorological Observatory, Marge landed on Boao in Qionghai, Hainan District at 4:40 am on September 14. The wind at the center of the storm reached 60 meters per second and the pressure was 925 hPa. During the landing, Qionghai's houses were almost completely destroyed. In Qionghai alone, there were 771 deaths.

The disaster report by the Revolutionary Committee of the Hainan Administrative Region to the Guangdong Provincial Party Committee showed that 90% of the houses collapsed, and some communes in Ding'an, Tunchang, and Changjiang also suffered varying degrees of damage. According to data in the Qionghai Archives, the typhoon destroyed a total of 206,610 residential houses. 90,632 were completely destroyed, 29,946 suffered a partial collapse, and 86,03 were damaged. Almost 400 cattle died. More than 535 pigs were lost. Approximately 40% of the rice harvest was destroyed, and Qiuci lost 40,000 mu, accounting for 56% of the county's planting area that year. Sugarcane lost 16,000 mu, accounting for 40% of the planting area in Hui County that year. Rubber loss was about 2.32 million plants of 70,000 mu, accounting for 70% of the county's planting area that year. 80% of the rubber trees passed by the typhoon center were broken, and the losses were particularly heavy. The area's pepper trees suffered about 17,000 mu or about 997,000 plants. Forestry loss 12, ten thousand acres. The loss of Hainan Island in Rmb cannot be calculated.

Data from the Qionghai Meteorological Station on the north side of the landing site showed that it recorded a 10-minute average wind speed of 48 meters per second from 4:12 to 4:22 on September 14. The anemometer was destroyed later and the maximum wind speed could not be obtained. A sea-level pressure of 937.8 hPa was recorded at 4:40. The Central Meteorological Observatory evaluated that the central wind reached 60 meters per second and the pressure was 925 hPa when Marge landed.

Typhoon Marge killed 903 people and injured 5,759 in Hainan Province.

=== Other ===
The National Disaster Risk Reduction and Management Council (NDRRMC) deployed search and rescue teams to support local authorities in ferrying people to safer ground. In Vietnam, Marge and previous storms made landfall in Northern Vietnam in late August and September 1973 brought heavy rainfall in Northern and North Central Vietnam, some provinces recorded rainfall at 900-1100mm.

== See also ==
- Typhoon Damrey (2005)
- Typhoon Rammasun (2014)
- Typhoon Yagi (2024)
