= Typhoon Kai-tak (2005) =

Pacific typhoon in 2005

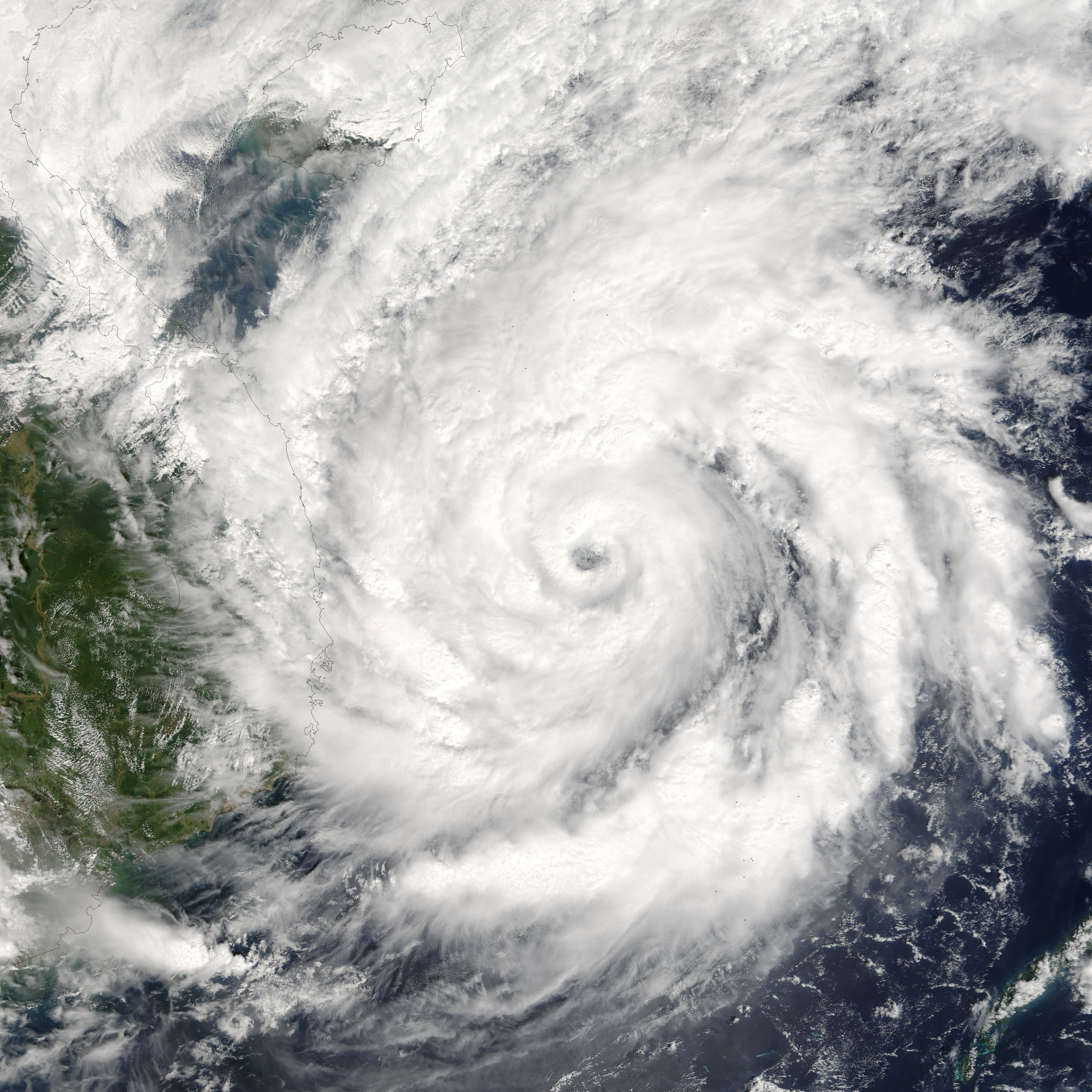
- Typhoon Kai-tak near its peak intensity, to the east of Quy Nhon, Vietnam on 30 October.

Meteorological history
- Formed: October 28, 2005
- Dissipated: November 2, 2005

Typhoon
- 10-minute sustained (JMA)
- Highest winds: 150 km/h (90 mph)
- Lowest pressure: 950 hPa (mbar); 28.05 inHg

Category 2-equivalent typhoon
- 1-minute sustained (SSHWS/JTWC)
- Highest winds: 155 km/h (100 mph)
- Lowest pressure: 958 hPa (mbar); 28.29 inHg

Overall effects
- Fatalities: 25
- Missing: 5
- Damage: >$7.78 million (2005 USD)
- Areas affected: Vietnam, China, Laos
- Part of the 2005 Pacific typhoon season

Typhoon Kai-tak was a strong tropical cyclone that made landfall in Vietnam and affected the nearby South China and Laos in early-November 2005. The twenty-first named storm and thirteenth typhoon of the annual typhoon season, Kai-tak originated from a tropical depression that developed on October 28, approximately 420 kilometers to the east of Manila, Philippines. Under favorable conditions, the depression intensified to a tropical storm, receiving the name Kai-tak from the JMA on the next day. It soon strengthened to a typhoon as it slowly approached Vietnam. On October 31, the storm started to weaken as the mid-level ridge pushed the system northwestward into a less favorable environment. It soon made landfall to the south of Hanoi, Vietnam as a tropical storm on November 2. The JMA and the JTWC issued their final warning for the storm as it dissipated, the next day.

25 deaths have been confirmed dead and another 5 are missing from Kai-tak. The damages from the storm are estimated at $11 million (2005 USD) and the damages from other countries are unknown.

== Meteorological history ==
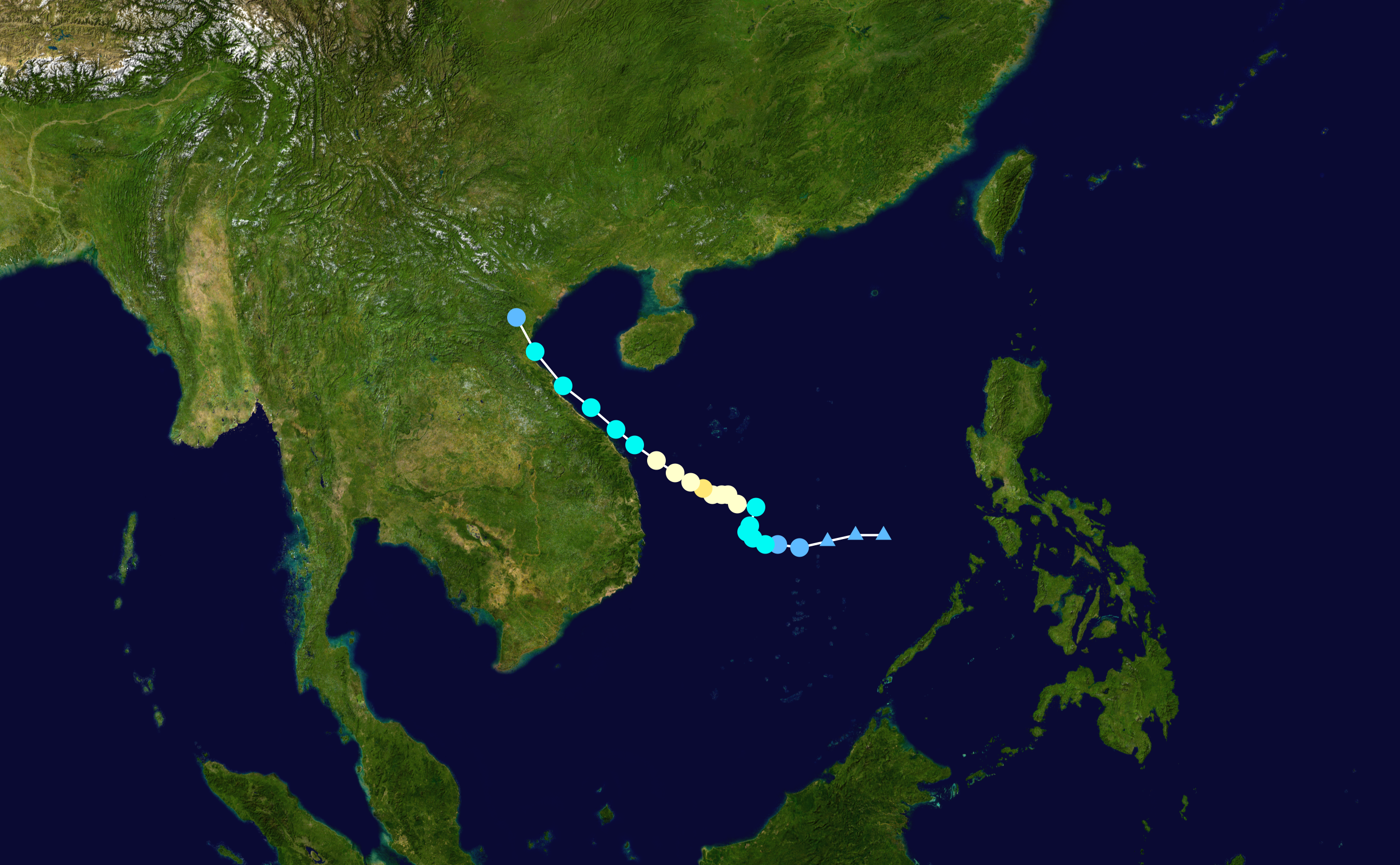
Map plotting the storm's track and intensity, according to the Saffir–Simpson scale Map key Saffir–Simpson scale Tropical depression (≤38 mph, ≤62 km/h) Tropical storm (39–73 mph, 63–118 km/h) Category 1 (74–95 mph, 119–153 km/h) Category 2 (96–110 mph, 154–177 km/h) Category 3 (111–129 mph, 178–208 km/h) Category 4 (130–156 mph, 209–251 km/h) Category 5 (≥157 mph, ≥252 km/h) Unknown Storm type Tropical cyclone Subtropical cyclone Extratropical cyclone, remnant low, tropical disturbance, or monsoon depression

Typhoon Kai-tak was first noted as an area of convection to the west-southwest of Manila, Philippines. Under favorable conditions, the disturbance continued to develop, prompting the JTWC to issue a TCFA to the system at 09:30 UTC on October 28. The JMA followed suit and recognized the system as a tropical depression on the same day. It intensified to a tropical storm on the next day, earning the name Kai-tak. (Note: The name Kai-tak (Cantonese: 啟德, [kʰɐi˧˥ tak˧]) was contributed by Hong Kong and refers to Kai Tak Airport in Cantonese.) Moving on an environment between two ridges, the tropical storm continued to intensify, becoming a typhoon on October 30. It rapidly intensified, becoming a Category 2 typhoon on the same day, before subsequently weakening due to unfavorable conditions and the land interaction on Vietnam. It was downgraded to a tropical storm on November 1, before making landfall near Thanh Hóa on the next day. It rapidly degraded over the mountainous terrain of Vietnam, before it was last noted on November 2, near Laos.

== Impact ==
At least twenty-five people were killed in Vietnam due to the flash floods and landslides triggered by Kai-tak, of which 5 individuals, including a Filipino was listed missing due to the typhoon. More than 3,000 people had been evacuated from Hội An, a seaside resort with a large beach and a traditional village. On Tuesday, the industrial port of Da Nang was without power for a few hours. There were at least 57 fishing boats that sank or were swept away, but no fishermen were injured. There were also destroyed 750 houses due to the landslides. The majority of flights to Danang airport were canceled, and the Chinese President of that time, Hu Jintao, who was scheduled to visit the central region, cut his visit short and was scheduled to leave Vietnam early Wednesday. Around 15,000 people have been displaced in Quang Nam province. In preparation for the incoming typhoon, tens of thousands of soldiers and police officers have been mobilized.

The damages associated with Kai-tak from Vietnam were estimated at ₫178 billion ($7.78 million). The damages in Laos, which were affected also by the remnants of the typhoon, is unknown.

== See also ==
- Typhoon Damrey (2005) - a typhoon that hit China and Vietnam on the same season, worsening the situations on that countries.
- Tropical Storm Mirinae (2016) – a severe tropical storm in 2016 that took almost an identical track
- Tropical Storm Linfa (2020) – a weak, short-lived but deadly and destructive tropical cyclone that was the twelfth-wettest tropical cyclone on record and the second of nine tropical cyclones in a row to strike Vietnam in 2020.
