= Typhoon Damrey (2005) =

Pacific typhoon in 2005

Typhoon Damrey (Labuyo)
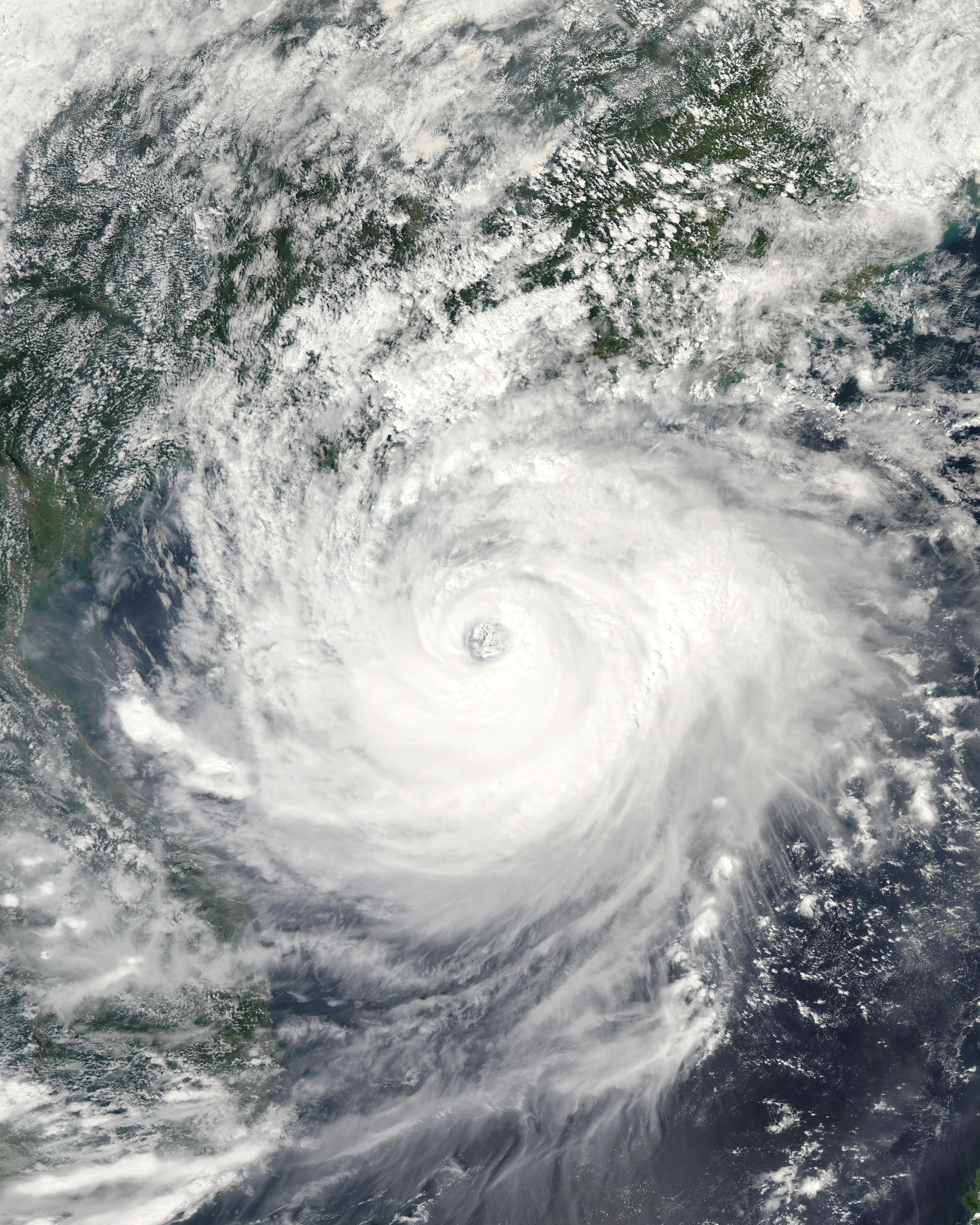
- Damrey at peak intensity prior to landfall in Hainan

Meteorological history
- Formed: September 19, 2005
- Dissipated: September 28, 2005

Typhoon
- 10-minute sustained (JMA)
- Highest winds: 150 km/h (90 mph)
- Lowest pressure: 955 hPa (mbar); 28.20 inHg

Category 2-equivalent typhoon
- 1-minute sustained (SSHWS/JTWC)
- Highest winds: 165 km/h (105 mph)
- Lowest pressure: 954 hPa (mbar); 28.17 inHg

Overall effects
- Fatalities: 179 total
- Damage: $1.73 billion (2005 USD)
- Areas affected: Philippines, Southern China, Vietnam, Laos, Thailand
- IBTrACS
- Part of the 2005 Pacific typhoon season

Typhoon Damrey, known in the Philippines as Typhoon Labuyo, was a typhoon that hit Vietnam and China in late September 2005. The typhoon was the most powerful storm to affect Hainan in over 30 years, killing more than 113 people.

== Meteorological history ==
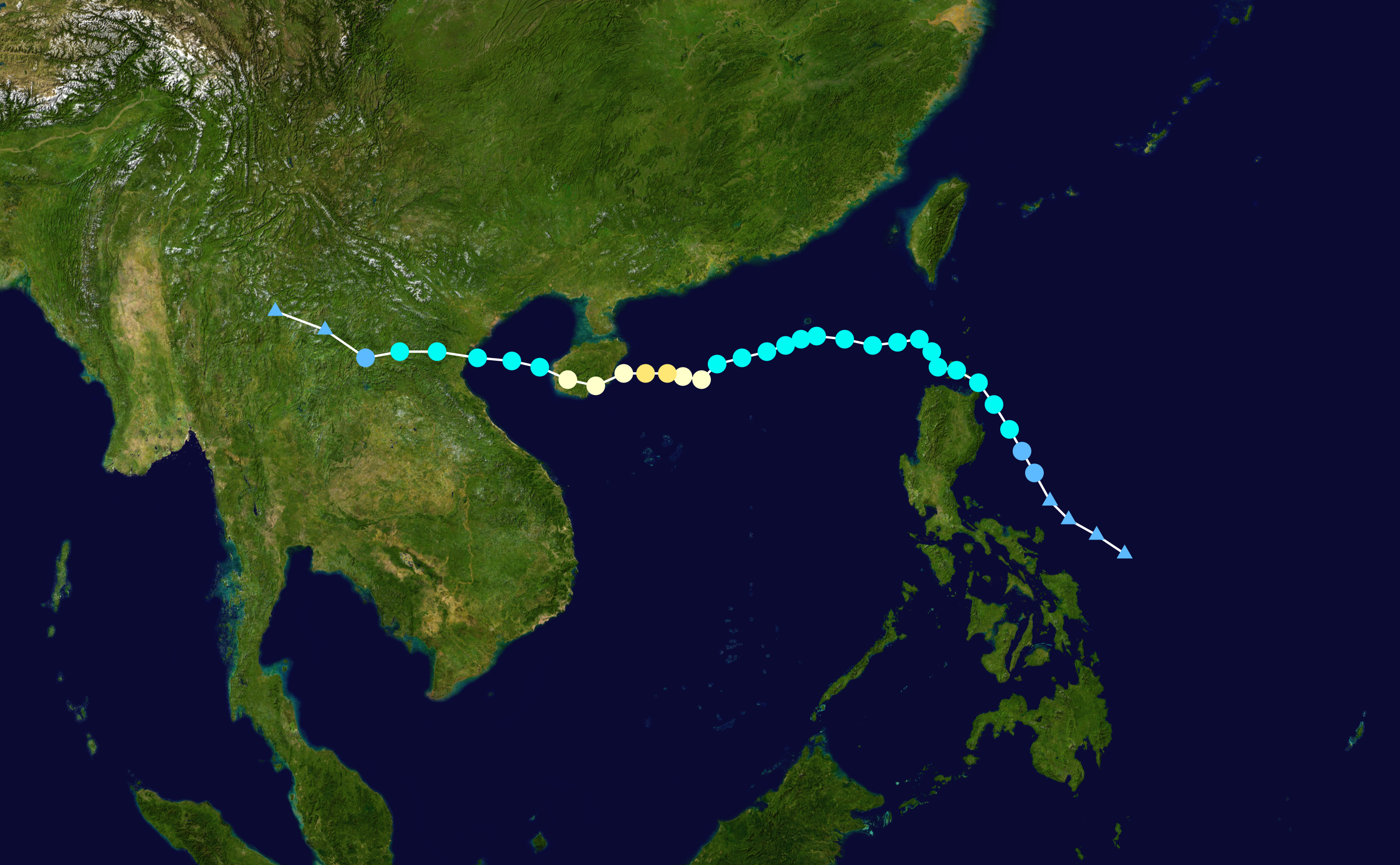
Map plotting the storm's track and intensity, according to the Saffir–Simpson scale Map key Saffir–Simpson scale Tropical depression (≤38 mph, ≤62 km/h) Tropical storm (39–73 mph, 63–118 km/h) Category 1 (74–95 mph, 119–153 km/h) Category 2 (96–110 mph, 154–177 km/h) Category 3 (111–129 mph, 178–208 km/h) Category 4 (130–156 mph, 209–251 km/h) Category 5 (≥157 mph, ≥252 km/h) Unknown Storm type Tropical cyclone Subtropical cyclone Extratropical cyclone, remnant low, tropical disturbance, or monsoon depression

Due to its proximity to the Philippines, PAGASA assigned it the name Labuyo and began issuing advisories to the east of the islands on September 19. The Japan Meteorological Agency gave warnings on the same day. On September 20, the storm was classified as a tropical depression 17W by the Joint Typhoon Warning Center (JTWC). On September 21, the JTWC upgraded it to a tropical storm and assigned it the name Damrey. (Note: The name Damrey (Khmer: ដំរី, [ɗɑm.ˈrəj]) was contributed by Cambodia and means elephant in Khmer.) Damrey strengthened into a typhoon on September 24.

Damrey made landfall at Wanning, China's Hainan, at 20:00 UTC on September 25 (04:00 on September 26, local time). It had maximum sustained winds up to 180 km/h. This made Damrey the strongest typhoon to strike Hainan since Typhoon Marge in September 1973. At least 16 people are believed to have died in China, and the entire province of Hainan suffered power outages. Damrey went on to impact Vietnam before losing tropical characteristics. The JTWC ceased advisories on September 27, with the final one taking place at 09:00 UTC, once the system was 90 nautical miles (170 km) south-southwest of Hanoi, Vietnam.

== Preparations ==
In the Philippines, officials in the province of Ilocos Norte evacuated nearly 20,000 residents from flood-prone regions to schools being used as temporary shelters. In fourteen of the country's provinces, storm signal one, the lowest on a scale of four, was issued by meteorologists.

== Impact ==
Deaths and damage by country
Country	Total deaths	Damage (USD)
China	29	$1.5 billion
Laos	55	unknown
Philippines	16	>$21.4 million
Thailand	10	unknown
Vietnam	69	$208.9 million
Totals:	179	~$1.73 billion

Throughout southeastern Asia, Typhoon Damrey was considered one of the worst typhoons in history. Many places sustained damage not seen in several decades. In Hainan Island, the entire province was without power at one point, a highly unusual event. Additionally, Typhoon Damrey became the strongest storm to make landfall on the island since Typhoon Della in 1974. In Vietnam, Damrey was referred to as the worst typhoon to strike the country in nine years.

=== Philippines ===
As a tropical storm, Damrey produced significant rainfall across portions of the Philippines. The highest rainfall total was recorded in Daet, Camarines Norte at 159 mm (6.3 in). Widespread flash flooding triggered by these rains led to substantial agricultural and property damage. In the agricultural department alone, officials estimated that the storm wrought over 1 billion Philippine pesos (USD 21.4 million) in losses. Over 9,000 hectares (22,239 acres) of rice and corn fields were flooded in Isabela Province alone. Throughout the country, 16 people were killed as a result of flooding, several of whom were children from Isabela Province. Landslides along the major roadway between the provinces of Ilocos Norte and Cagayan were impassable, due to landslides and downed trees. Farther west, 35 villages were flooded in the provinces of Camarines Sur and Albay.

=== China ===
Typhoon Damrey caused widespread destruction across Hainan becoming the strongest typhoon to hit the island in 30 years. It would be 9 years until a stronger typhoon hit Hainan that would be Rammasun and later Yagi 19 years later. There were 29 deaths in China. The storm has left $1.5 billion dollars in damage.

=== Vietnam ===
Sustained wind speeds of 33 m/s (119 km/h) with gusts reaching 39 m/s (140 km/h) were recorded at the Văn Lý weather station in Nam Định. At another station in Thanh Hoá City (Thanh Hoá), sustained winds reached 25 m/s (90 km/h). Rainfall from the storm exceeded 250 mm in several areas, including 401 mm at Km46 (Sơn La), 348 mm in Chi Nê (Hoà Bình), 279 mm in Tam Đảo (Vĩnh Phúc), and 382 mm in Đình Lập (Lạng Sơn).

Throughout Vietnam, 69 people were killed as a result of the typhoon. Torrential rains from the storm inundating 300,000 hectares (741,316 acres) of farmland and roughly 100,000 homes. Damage from the storm was estimated at nearly 3.3 trillion Vietnamese dongs (USD 208.9 million). The most severe damage took place in northern Yen Bai province, where 51 people were either killed or missing. Roughly 120 km (75 mi) of dykes built to protect farmland from flooding were destroyed by the typhoon. More than 10,400 homes and schools were destroyed by floodwaters, leaving tens of thousands of people homeless.

=== Laos and Thailand ===
After moving through Vietnam, the former typhoon brought heavy rainfall to parts of Laos which triggered widespread flash flooding. Throughout the country, 55 people were killed as a result of the storm. In northern Thailand, the remnants of Damrey produced widespread flooding that killed ten people and left three others missing. The most severe damage took place in Lampang province, where seven people were killed and one other was missing. Nearly 2,000 people were evacuated due to flooding which caused damage to an estimated 32,000 homes. In addition to the thousands of damaged homes, 40 roads, 24 bridges, and a reservoir were also damaged. Elsewhere in Thailand, three people were killed as a result of Damrey.

== Aftermath ==
Shortly after the storm passed by the Philippines, officials quickly began search-and-rescue operations in the hardest-hit regions. Personnel from the 501st Brigade of the Philippine Coast Guard led the rescue efforts in Ilocos Norte. Food, water, and supplies were being delivered to evacuation centers to care for evacuees and victims. In the wake of the storm, the governor of Aurora Province requested government assistance for residents in central areas of the province. By September 21, the Philippine Navy deployed rescue personnel to the area. Additionally, the National Disaster Coordinating Council and the Department of Social Welfare and Development provided medical supplies and relief items to the affected areas.

== See also ==
- Tropical cyclones in 2005
- Typhoon Marge (1973)
- Typhoon Rammasun (2014)
- Tropical Storm Kompasu (2021)
- Typhoon Yagi (2024)
