= 2025 Pacific typhoon season =

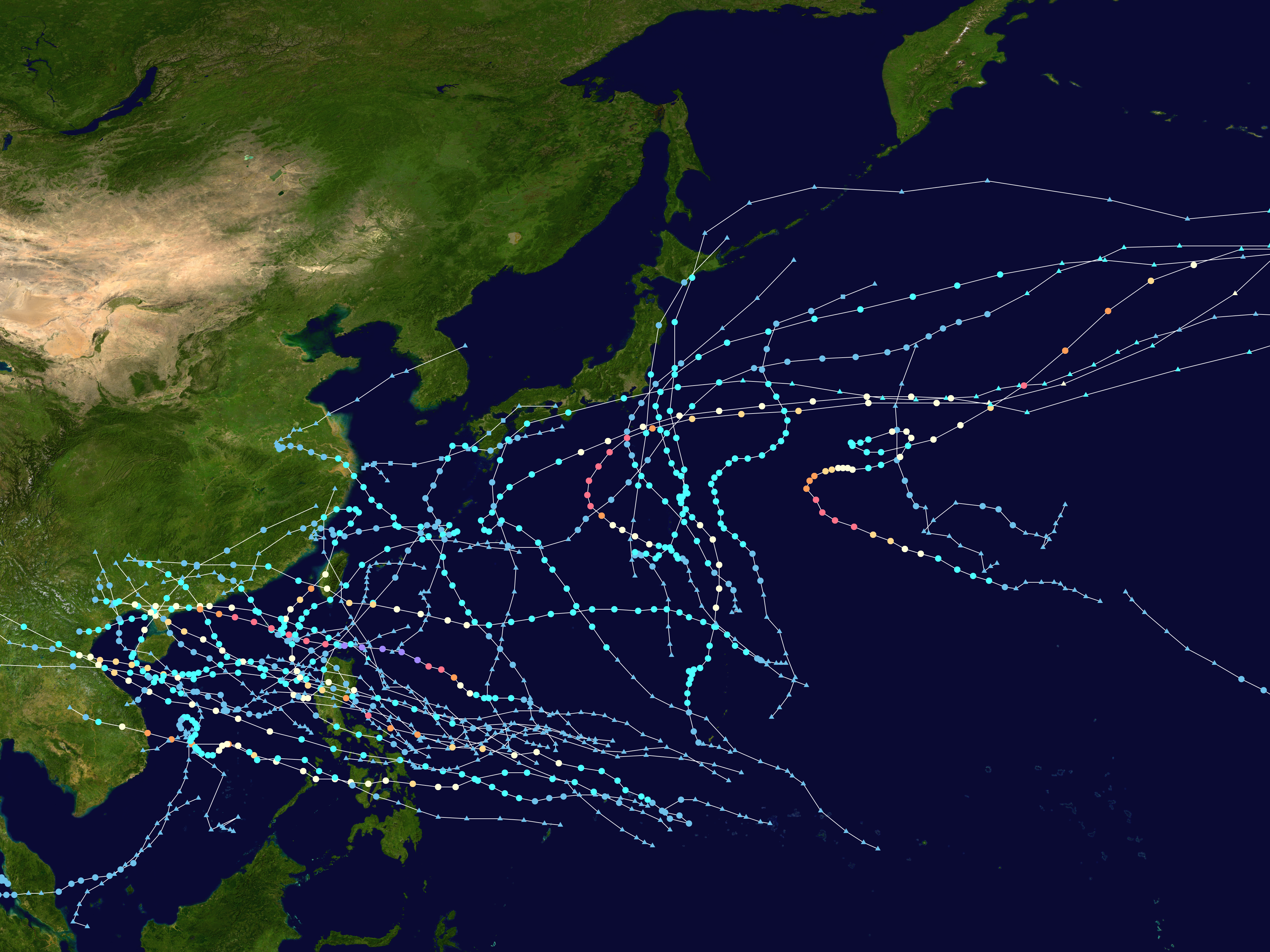
- Season summary map

Seasonal boundaries
- First system formed: February 11, 2025
- Last system dissipated: December 9, 2025

Strongest storm
- Name: Ragasa
  - Maximum winds: 205 km/h (125 mph) (10-minute sustained)
  - Lowest pressure: 905 hPa (mbar)

Seasonal statistics
- Total depressions: 42, 1 unofficial
- Total storms: 27, 1 unofficial
- Typhoons: 13
- Very strong typhoons: 5
- Violent typhoons: 1
- Total fatalities: 653 total
- Total damage: $10.8 billion (2025 USD)

Related articles
- 2025 Atlantic hurricane season; 2025 Pacific hurricane season; 2025 North Indian Ocean cyclone season

The 2025 Pacific typhoon season was the second consecutive season to feature slightly above-average activity in terms of named storms and typhoons. However, it was a below-average season in terms of accumulated cyclone energy (ACE) and strong typhoons. Of the twenty-seven named tropical storms, thirteen became typhoons and one managed to intensify into a violent typhoon. Many storms were also weak and short-lived, particularly before and after the peak season activity. The season ran throughout 2025, though most tropical cyclones typically develop between June and November. In addition, the season's first named storm, Wutip, developed on June 11, the fifth-latest date for a typhoon season to produce a named storm, while the season’s last named storm, Koto, dissipated on December 3. In addition, the season’s first typhoon, Danas, reached that intensity on July 6. Furthermore, the season’s only violent typhoon, Ragasa reached that intensity on September 21 before it struck the Philippines on the following day.

The scope of this article is limited to the Pacific Ocean north of the equator between 100°E and the 180th meridian. Within the northwestern Pacific Ocean, two separate agencies assign names to tropical cyclones, which can result in a system having two names. The Japan Meteorological Agency (JMA) (Note: The Japan Meteorological Agency is the official Regional Specialized Meteorological Centre for the western Pacific Ocean.) names a tropical cyclone when it is estimated to have 10-minute sustained winds of at least 65 km/h (40 mph) anywhere in the basin. The Philippine Atmospheric, Geophysical and Astronomical Services Administration (PAGASA) assigns names to tropical cyclones that move into or form as a tropical depression within the Philippine Area of Responsibility (PAR), defined as the area between 135°E–115°E and 5°N–25°N, regardless of whether the JMA has already named the system. Tropical depressions monitored by the United States Joint Typhoon Warning Center (JTWC) (Note: The Joint Typhoon Warning Center is a joint United States Navy–United States Air Force task force that issues tropical cyclone warnings for the western Pacific Ocean and other regions.) are given a numerical designation with a "W" suffix, which means "west", a reference to the western Pacific region. (Note: A super typhoon is an unofficial category used by the JTWC for a typhoon with winds of at least 240 km/h (150 mph).)

== Seasonal forecasts ==
TSR forecasts Date	Tropical storms	Total typhoons	Intense TCs	ACE	Ref.
Average (1991–2020)	25.5	16.0	9.3	301	
May 7, 2025	25	15	8	266	
July 8, 2025	25	15	8	250	
August 7, 2025	25	15	7	237	
Other forecasts Date	Forecast center	Period	Systems		Ref.
January 23, 2025	PAGASA	January–March	0–3 tropical cyclones		
January 23, 2025	PAGASA	April–June	2–5 tropical cyclones		
July 14, 2025	PAGASA	July–September	6–10 tropical cyclones		
July 14, 2025	PAGASA	October–December	5–9 tropical cyclones		
2025 season	Forecast center	Tropical cyclones	Tropical storms	Typhoons	Ref.
Actual activity:	JMA	41	27	13	
Actual activity:	JTWC	34 (Note: 01C is no longer recognized by the U.S government. 07W is a subtropical depression according to the Joint Typhoon Warning Center (JTWC). 04B was a tropical depression in this basin, according to the JTWC.)	27	16	
Actual activity:	PAGASA	23	15	9	

During the year, several national meteorological services and scientific agencies forecast how many tropical cyclones, tropical storms, and typhoons will form during a season and/or how many tropical cyclones will affect a particular country. These agencies include the Tropical Storm Risk (TSR) Consortium of University College London, PAGASA, Vietnam's National Center for Hydro-Meteorological Forecasting (NCHMF) and Taiwan's Central Weather Administration (CWA).

On January 23, 2025, PAGASA released its first outlook in their monthly seasonal climate outlook predicting the first half of 2025. They expected zero to three tropical cyclones that would form or enter the Philippine Area of Responsibility (PAR) from January to March, while two to five tropical cyclones are predicted to form or enter PAR between April to June. The agency also noted that La Niña conditions are expected to persist between January and March, with transition El Niño-Southern Oscillation (ENSO) conditions also anticipated during April to June.

On May 7, 2025, TSR issued its first extended-range forecast, predicting slightly below-average activity with 25 named storms, 15 typhoons, and 8 intense typhoons. The outlook was influenced by expected neutral ENSO conditions, strong easterly wind anomalies in April, the absence of early-season storm activity, and a continued negative phase of the Pacific decadal oscillation (PDO), all of which are factors typically associated with reduced typhoon activity.

PAGASA had also updated its second and final outlook on July 14 for July to September, predicting six to ten tropical cyclones would form or enter PAR during those months, while five to nine of those would form or enter PAR between October to December. The agency also indicated that the ENSO condition would also persist between July to September, and would further continue until the first quarter of the following year.

TSR released its updated extended-range forecast on August 7, maintaining the number of named storms and typhoons but reducing the number of intense typhoons to 7. They also significantly decrease the prediction of the accumulated cyclone energy (ACE) index due to the lower-than-expected storm activity in June and July and the ongoing negative PDO phase.

== Seasonal summary ==
=== Background ===
The 2025 Pacific typhoon season has no official season limit, although most tropical cyclones typically develop between June and November. In this season, 41 tropical cyclones formed, with 27 strengthening into named storms. Thirteen of them intensified into typhoons, and one further intensified into a violent typhoon.

=== Early season activity ===
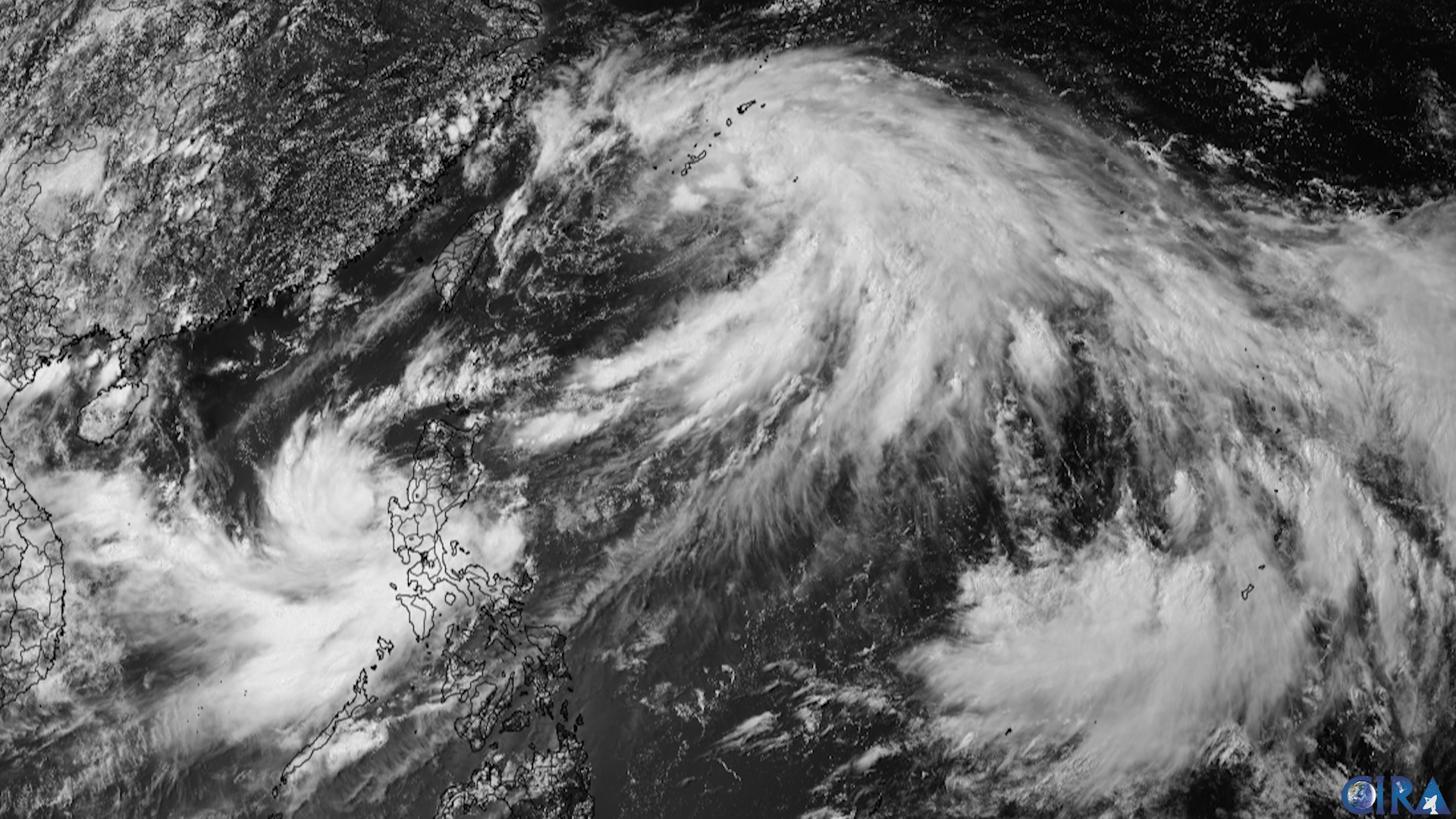
Three systems active on July 24: Severe Tropical Storm Co-May (far left); Tropical Storm Francisco (upper center); and Tropical Storm Krosa (lower right).

The season officially began with the formation of a tropical depression on February 11 near the Philippines. The season became relatively inactive for four months, until Tropical Storm Wutip developed on June 11, becoming the fifth-latest named storm on record in the western Pacific basin. It also ended a 169-day period with no named storm activity in the basin. Wutip caused widespread damage across parts of the Philippines, Vietnam, and China, leaving 17 people dead and resulting in US$253 million in damage. On the same day, another low-pressure area formed east of the Philippines; it developed into Tropical Depression Auring the next day. Auring moved northward and crossed Taiwan before weakening into a remnant low. On June 21, Tropical Depression 02W formed north of the Northern Mariana Islands, which developed into Tropical Storm Sepat two days later off the coast of Japan. On June 24, Tropical Depression 03W developed west of the Philippines.

Satellite animation of Typhoon Danas making landfall in Budai, Chiayi County, Taiwan on July 6 before weakening.

July was notably active, producing eight named storms, including one not recognized by the JMA. The month began with Tropical Storm Mun, which largely spared affected areas. The season's first typhoon, Danas, formed on July 3 and made landfall over Budai, Chiayi in Taiwan as a Category 3-equivalent typhoon, becoming the first typhoon to strike the island's west-central coast since Typhoon Wayne in 1986. On July 11, two systems formed: Tropical Storm Nari and Tropical Depression 07W, with the former storm making landfall over Cape Erimo in Japan. Later in the month, Tropical Storm Wipha developed near the Philippine coast, passing through the Babuyan Islands as a severe tropical storm before heading to southern China and Vietnam, where it made landfall over Taishan, Guangdong in China and between the provinces of Hưng Yên and Ninh Bình in Vietnam, causing 60 fatalities and significant damage throughout its path.

Highest Tropical Cyclone Wind Signal issued by PAGASA for Severe Tropical Storm Co-May in each province in the Philippines.

By the end of July, three more cyclones had developed: Francisco, Co-May, and Krosa. Co-May formed northeast of Ilocos Sur, intensifying into a minimal typhoon as it loitered west-southwestward and then tracked southwestward off the west coast of Luzon due to a Fujiwhara interaction with Tropical Storm Francisco, which was situated northeast of Luzon at that time, as well also being situated in the eastern semicircle of a monsoon gyre. Co-may later made two landfalls over Agno, Pangasinan and Candon, Ilocos Sur in the Philippines, becoming the strongest and first tropical cyclone to affect the Ilocos Region since Chan-hom of 2009. Co-may later weakened into a tropical depression after crossing through the rugged terrain of Cordillera Range before regained tropical storm status again on July 27 when the storm moved through the Ryukyu Islands. Co-may made two final landfalls in China, one Zhujiajian Island, Zhejiang on July 29, and another in Fengxian District, Shanghai on July 30. Overall, Co-may claimed the lives 55 people and caused US$73 million in damage. The month concluded with the formation of Tropical Storm Bailu on July 31.

=== Peak season activity ===
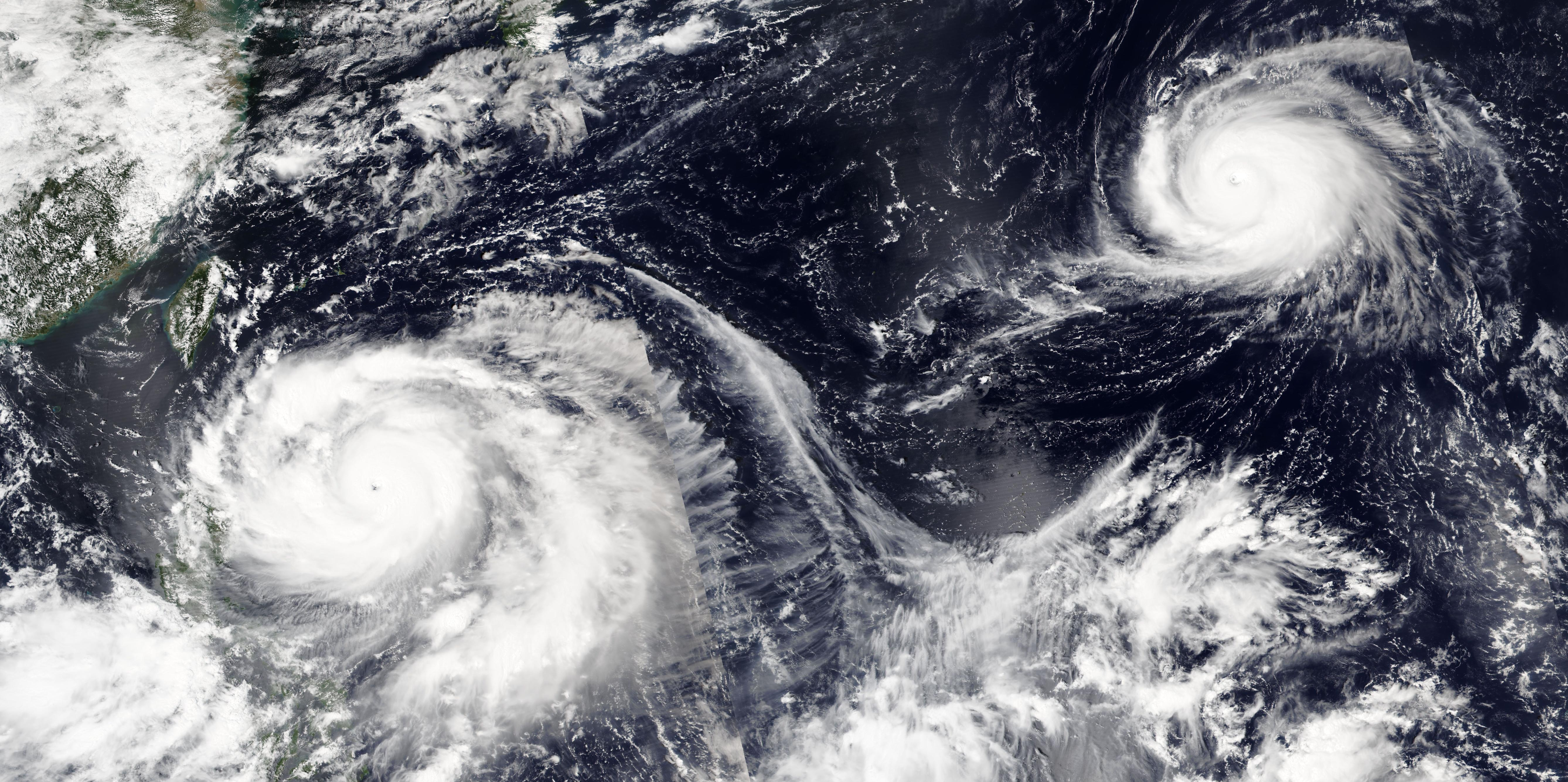
Two simultaneous active tropical cyclones on September 20: Typhoons Ragasa (left) and Neoguri (upper right)

August was slightly active compared to the previous month. Early on August 2, the remnant low of Hurricane Iona entered the basin from the Central Pacific and briefly became a tropical depression. Two tropical depressions formed between August 2 and 4, while Typhoon Podul formed on August 6. Podul made landfall over Taimali in Taiwan as a Category 1-equivalent typhoon and then in China as a tropical storm, causing moderate damage there and claiming two lives. Tropical Depression Fabian formed on August 7 and Tropical Depression 17W ten days later. Tropical Storm Lingling formed near Japan on August 17, causing minimal damage, while Typhoon Kajiki, which formed southeast of Luzon on August 22, caused extensive damage in northern Vietnam after it brushed Central Luzon and then skirting the southern part of Hainan Island, killing a total of 17 people and causing US$244 million in damage. Tropical Storm Nongfa formed last on August 27 and affected the North Central Coast of Vietnam three days later, concluding the month of August.

Typhoon Ragasa nearing Babuyan Islands on September 22

The month of September began with Tropical Storm Peipah on September 2, tracking northeast along the subtropical ridge before affecting Japan and then becoming extratropical on September 5. Severe Tropical Storm Tapah formed near Vigan, Ilocos Sur on the same day, making landfall in Taishan, Guangdong, China on September 8, before interacting with rugged terrain. During the peak of the season, three tropical cyclones formed: Mitag, Ragasa, and Neoguri. Tropical Storm Mitag formed near Legazpi, Albay and eventually crossed through the Cordillera Central, slightly weakened into a depression before regaining tropical storm status again in the South China Sea. Mitag made landfall over Shanwei, Guangdong, China before rapidly deteriorating at the same time on September 20. Typhoon Ragasa became the first and only violent typhoon of the season, reaching peak intensity near the Babuyan Islands. Ragasa eventually made landfall over Panuitan Island in Calayan, Cagayan on September 22 before undergoing an eyewall replacement cycle afterwards. The storm then affected Southern China and Vietnam before dissipating on September 25.

Typhoon Neoguri then formed near Wake Island and strengthened into a “very strong” typhoon amid high SSTs, then weakened for a time due to a combination of upwelling and high wind shear, but restrengthened into an unusually high-latitude Category 4-equivalent typhoon near 40°N, making it one of the strongest unusually high-latitude cyclones on record. Typhoon Bualoi formed on September 22 near Yap and made multiple landfalls in the Philippines and Vietnam, causing extensive damages and numerous fatalities in those countries.

=== Late season activity ===
Tropical Storm Matmo strengthening over the Philippine Sea on October 2 before its landfall.

October began with the formation of Typhoon Matmo, which made landfall over Dinapigue, Isabela as a minimal typhoon before it reemerged through West Philippine Sea and restrengthened into a typhoon again while reaching its peak intensity. Matmo then brushed through Southern China, resulting in at least 39 deaths and damage amounting to $3.86 billion (2025 USD), the costliest in the basin of the year. Typhoon Halong then formed next, becoming a “very strong” typhoon on October 7, with 10-min winds of up to 185 km/h (115 mph). Halong directly affected Hachijō-jima thereafter before transitioning to extratropical on October 10. Typhoon Nakri stalled near the Ryukyu Islands as a tropical storm before becoming a typhoon just south of Japan. Severe Tropical Storm Fengshen formed next on October 12, which affected some parts of Bicol Region, Southern Tagalog, including Metro Manila in the Philippines as a tropical storm between October 18 and 19 before eventually dissipated off the coast of Vietnam four days later. At that time after Fengshen made multiple landfalls in the Philippines, a tropical depression named Salome by PAGASA was formed on October 20. PAGASA then upgraded Salome into a tropical storm (later downgraded to a depression) three days later before the system become fully dissipated on the same day.

High-resolution imagery of Typhoon Fung-wong nearing Luzon prior to its landfall in Dinalungan, Aurora on November 9.

On the last day of October, Kalmaegi formed, persisting into November and made multiple landfalls in Visayas and Palawan and later Vietnam, causing significant damage and high death toll, primarily as a result of the freshwater flooding. This made Kalmaegi the deadliest typhoon in this basin for this year, with over 288 deaths. On November 6, Typhoon Fung-wong formed. It rapidly intensified in the Philippine Sea as a “very strong” typhoon, while also being assessed as a super typhoon based on PAGASA before it made landfall over Dinalungan, Aurora. Fung-wong then curved northeastwards, gradually weakened after it interacted with the Cordillera Central, which helped the storm to significantly weaken. Fung-wong made another landfall over Hengchun Township in Pingtung County, Taiwan on November 12 as a tropical storm, and shortly after weakened into a tropical depression. The system then dissipated the following day.

November saw the formation of Koto and 34W. Koto traversed most of Visayas in the Philippines before it strengthened into a typhoon while over the South China Sea. Koto then stalled as it moved over unfavorable conditions before dissipating on December 3. Meanwhile, the disturbance that was associated with Cyclone Senyar crossed and entered through the Western Pacific basin on November 27. The JMA and JTWC started issuing advisories, with the latter gave the system as 34W as it subsequently upgraded into a depression. Three days later, both agencies discontinued advisories as it dissipated.

The 41st tropical depression formed on December 1, with the PAGASA naming it Wilma as it entered the PAR. Wilma struggled to intensify due to unfavorable conditions. PAGASA also issued Tropical Cyclone Wind Signal No. 1 over numerous areas of Visayas, Mindanao, and Palawan on December 4. Wilma made two landfalls over Hilabaan Island in Dolores, Eastern Samar and in Oras, Eastern Samar before declaring it a remnant low on December 7.

== Systems ==
=== Severe Tropical Storm Wutip ===
- Severe tropical storm (JMA)
- Category 1 typhoon (SSHWS)
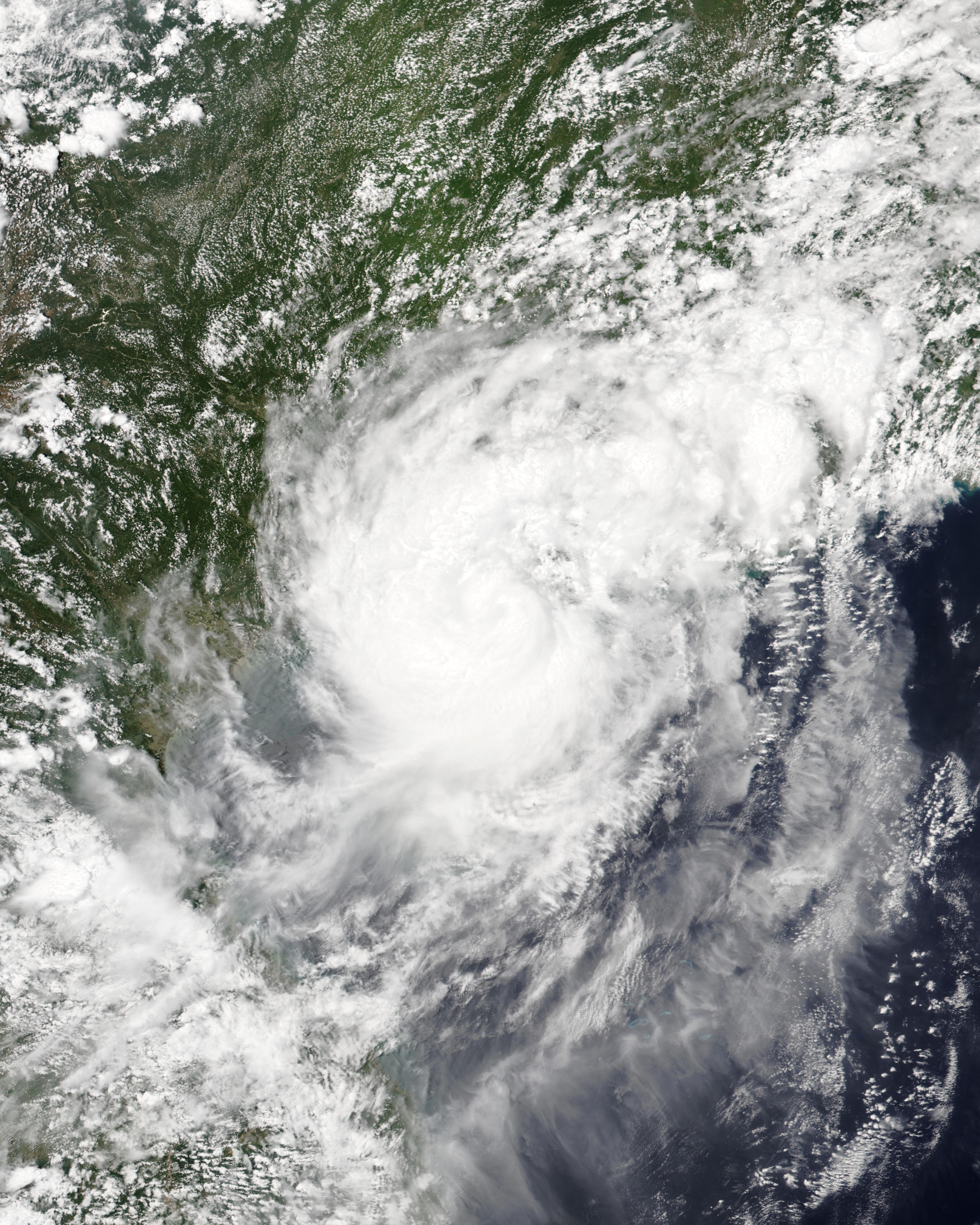
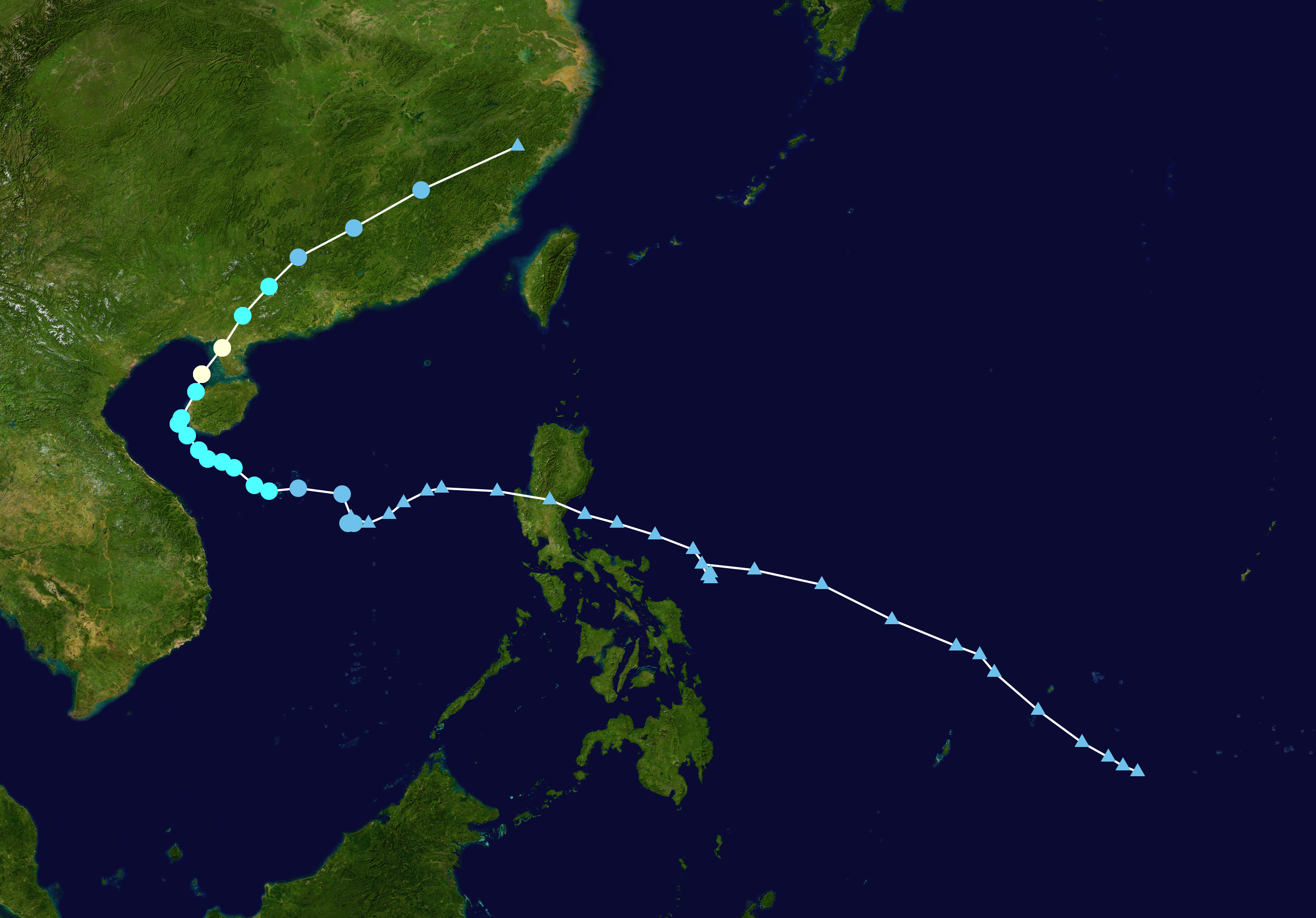
- Duration: June 9 – June 15
- Peak intensity: 100 km/h (65 mph) (10-min); 980 hPa (mbar)

A tropical depression formed over the South China Sea on June 9. On the next day, the JTWC designated it as Tropical Depression 01W. The JMA upgraded it to Tropical Storm Wutip on June 11. The storm strengthened further while moving to the west-northwest. At 18:00 UTC, the JMA further upgraded the system to a severe tropical storm. Wutip hit the southwest coast of China's Hainan Island at around 15:00 UTC on June 13, before reemerging over the Gulf of Tonkin shortly after. On June 14, the JTWC reported that Wutip had rapidly intensified into a minimal typhoon, although its deep convection had largely collapsed. Later that day, Wutip made its second landfall near Leizhou City in Guangdong Province at around 12:30 CST (04:30 UTC). After landfall, it weakened into a minimal tropical storm, as satellite imagery indicated that its eye had filled in. The JMA downgraded Wutip to a tropical depression on the same day when it was inland, and continued tracking the system until it dissipated at 12:00 UTC on June 15.

The precursor to Wutip, along with the southwest monsoon, triggered a lahar flow near Kanlaon Volcano in the Philippines. In Hainan, Wutip brought damaging winds with gusts of 191–217 km/h (119–135 mph; 103–117 kn). In Vietnam, water levels in several rivers reached their highest marks in 30 years. Total damage reached 1.317 trillion dong (US$52.4 million).

=== Tropical Depression Auring ===
- Tropical depression (JMA)
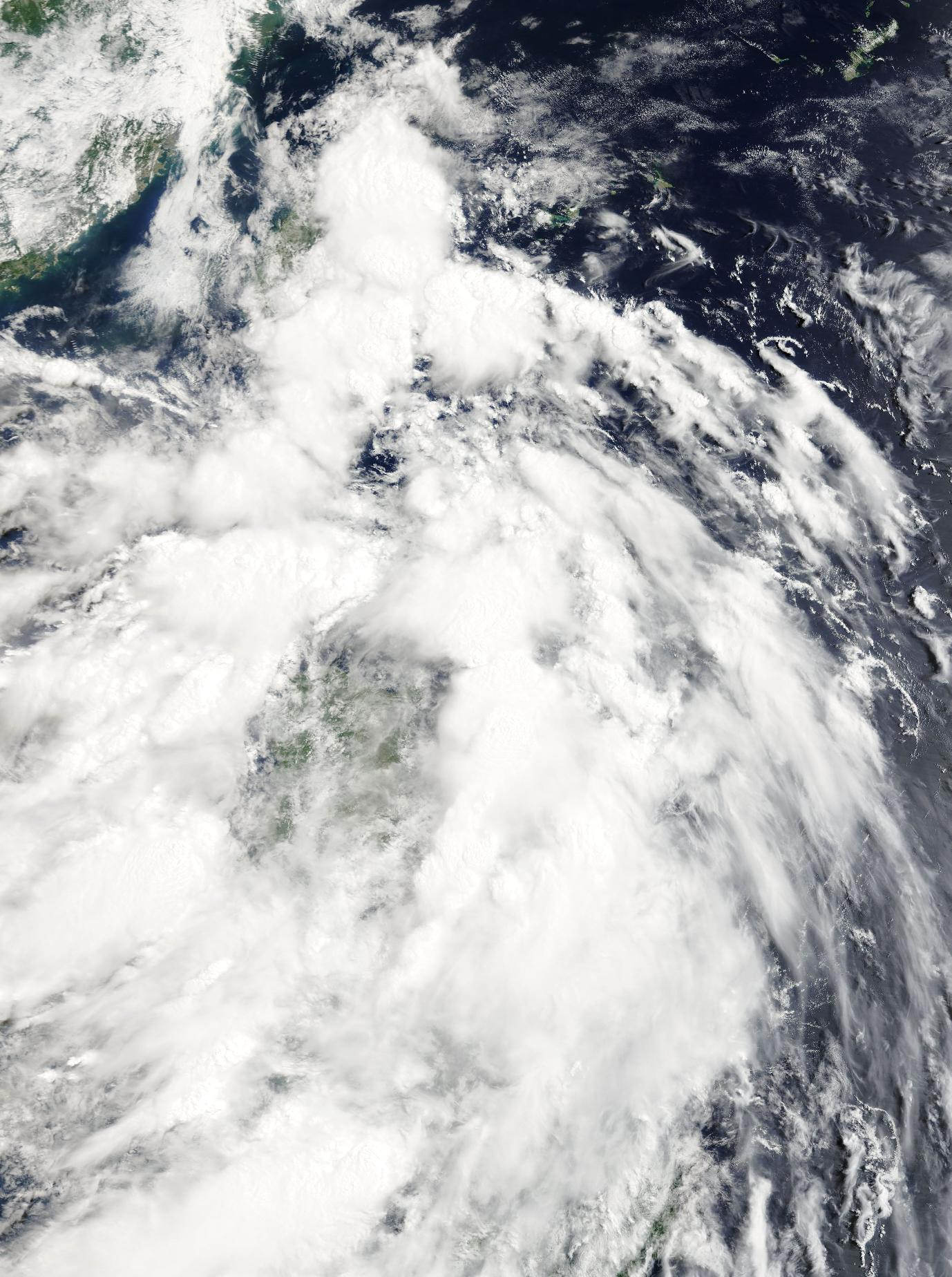
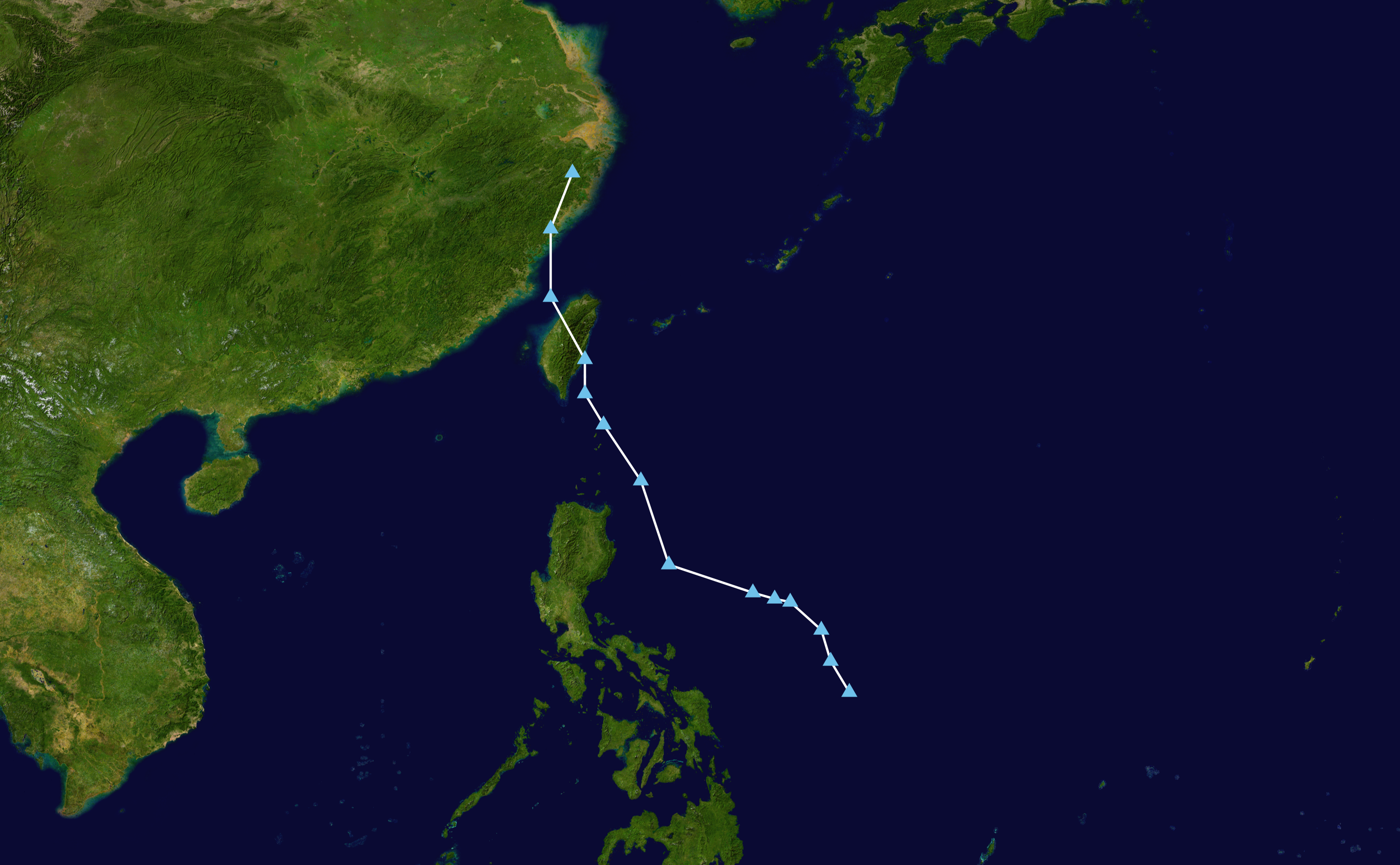
- Duration: June 11 – June 13
- Peak intensity: 55 km/h (35 mph) (10-min); 1004 hPa (mbar)

On June 11, the JMA announced that a tropical depression had developed east of the Philippines. On the same day, the PAGASA started monitoring the disturbance as a low-pressure area while it was still inside the Philippine Area of Responsibility (PAR). By the following day, it had intensified into a tropical depression and was named Auring by PAGASA. PAGASA reported that Auring made landfall in Taiwan and later weakened into a remnant low due to the frictional effects of its landfall. The agency issued its final advisory when the system exited the PAR, while the JMA continued to monitor it until it was last noted on June 13.

On June 12, Taiwan's Central Weather Administration issued a heavy rain warning for the counties of Yilan, Hualien, Taitung, and Pingtung. Heavy rainfall was recorded in Daliao District, with 205.5 mm (8.1 in) of precipitation recorded. At least one fatality and four injuries were reported due to the system. In China, the depression brought moisture northward along the edge of the Pacific high, resulting in significant rainfall in Zhejiang and Shanghai, with 52.9 mm (2.1 in) recorded in Shanyang, Shanghai. In the Philippines, Auring brought moderate to heavy rainfall and thunderstorms to the provinces of Batanes and Cagayan.

=== Tropical Storm Sepat ===
- Tropical storm (JMA)
- Tropical storm (SSHWS)
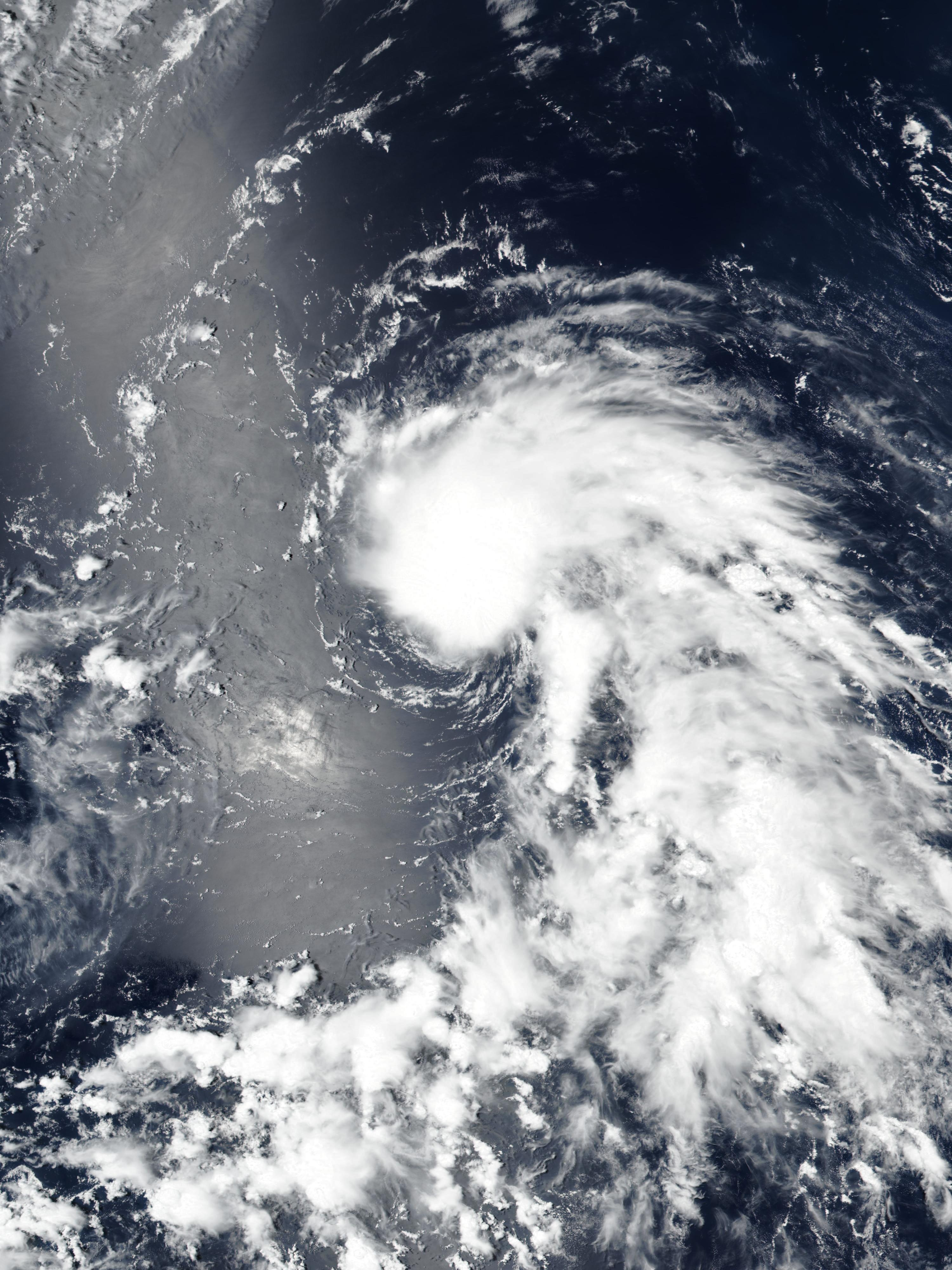
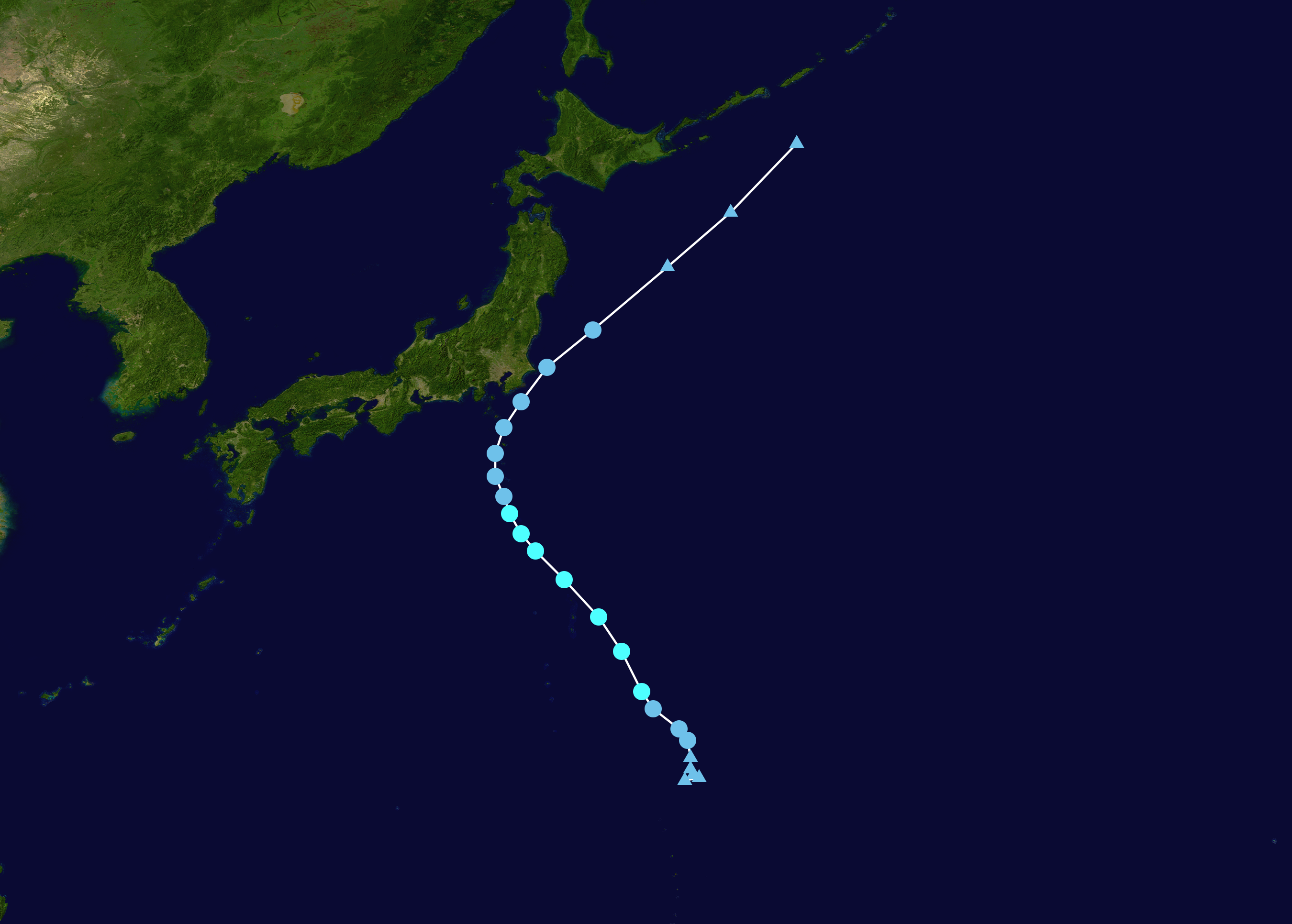
- Duration: June 21 – June 26
- Peak intensity: 65 km/h (40 mph) (10-min); 1004 hPa (mbar)

A tropical depression formed north of the Northern Mariana Islands on June 21. As it continued to develop, the JTWC designated it 02W on the next day. The system was situated in an area of low to moderate wind shear near the tropical upper-tropospheric trough, which limited outflow. Despite this, it still managed to intensify into a tropical storm on June 23, receiving the name Sepat from the JMA. Steered northwest by a subtropical ridge located to its northeast, Sepat strengthened as its structure improved.

Sepat's convective activity decreased significantly on June 24, halting any intensification. Later that day, the JTWC assessed that Sepat had weakened into a tropical depression as it slowed and entered a drier, more hostile environment. A trough approaching from the west began to impart strong wind shear on the depression as it neared Japan and turned north-northeastward. Further affected by colder sea surface temperatures, Sepat initiated its extratropical transition early on June 26, and as a result, the JTWC discontinued all advisories on Sepat.

=== Tropical Depression 03W ===
- Tropical depression (JMA)
- Tropical depression (SSHWS)
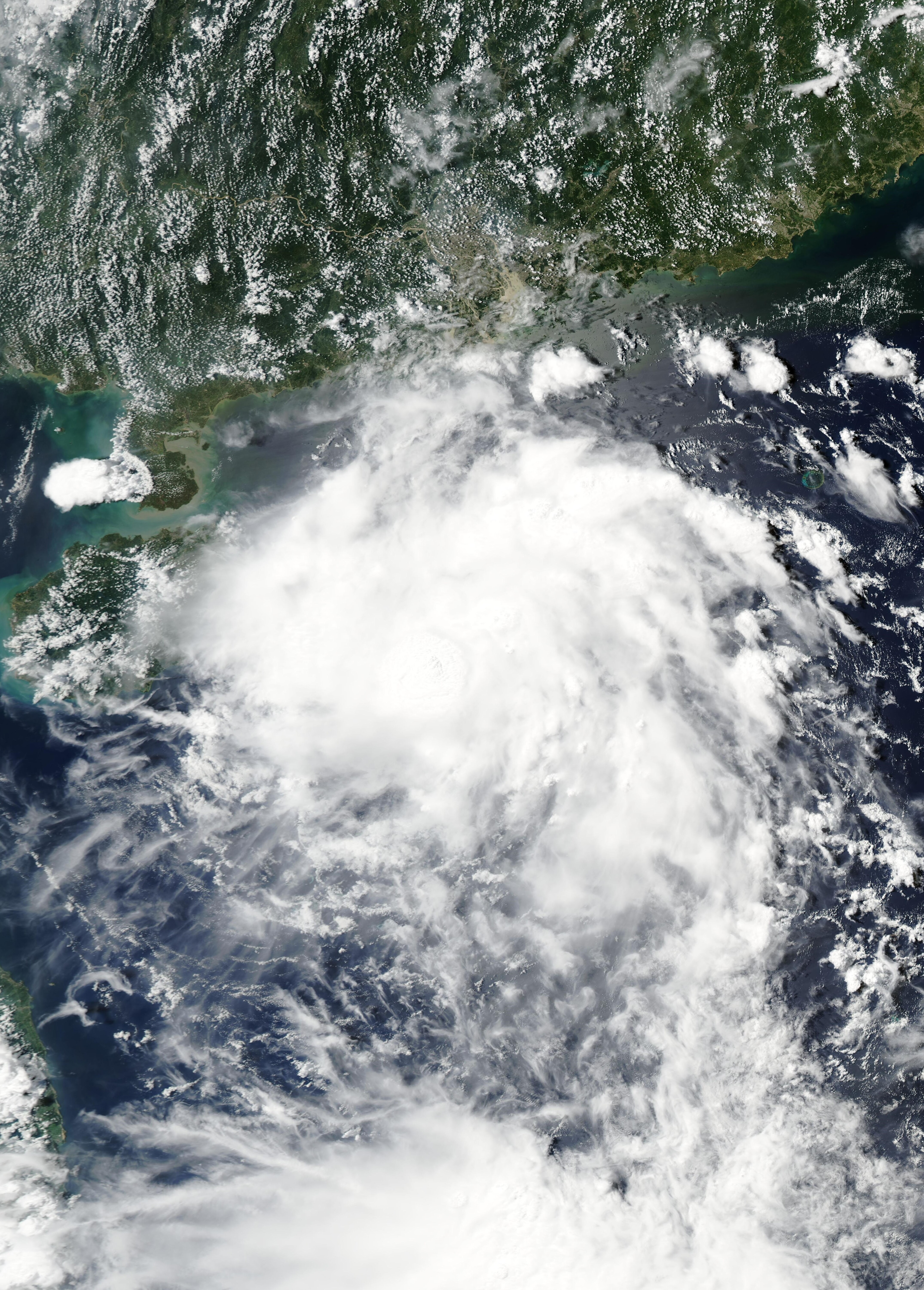
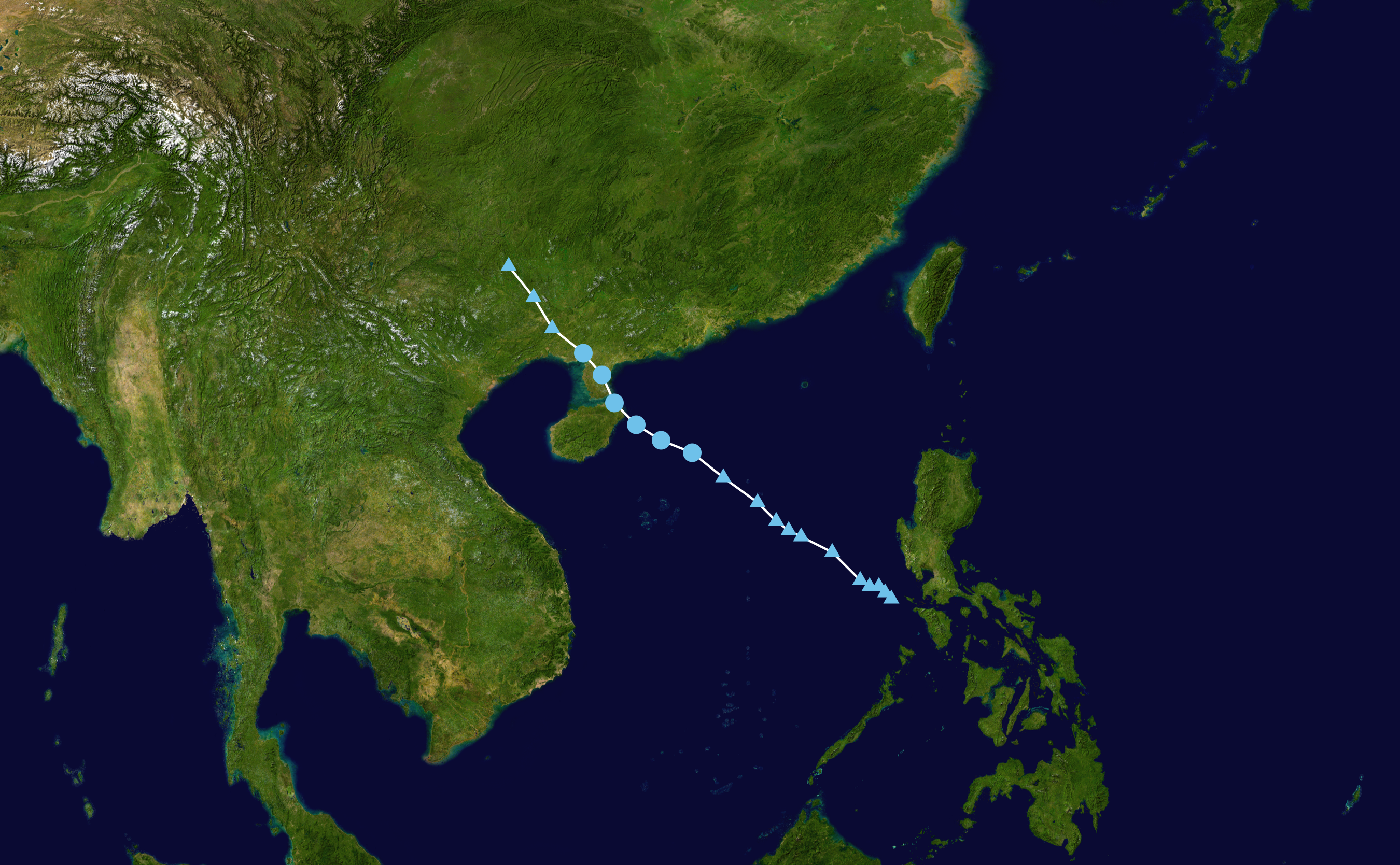
- Duration: June 24 – June 27
- Peak intensity: 55 km/h (35 mph) (10-min); 1002 hPa (mbar)

On June 24, the JMA announced that a tropical depression had developed west of the Philippines. As convective activity increased the next day, the JTWC designated the system as Tropical Depression 03W. Steered by a subtropical ridge located to its northeast, 03W tracked northwestward and remained poorly organized. The depression made landfall on the eastern coast of the Leizhou Peninsula by 02:00 UTC on June 26, moving inland before dissipating that day.

Heavy rains battered Northeastern Vietnam, triggering a landslide in Yên Bái Province which destroyed a house, killing one person inside. In Hainan, 03W brought severe flooding to the regions previously affected by Tropical Storm Wutip, causing widespread damages to crops and roads. Thousands were evacuated as a result, and five people were reported to have died in the flooding.

=== Severe Tropical Storm Mun ===
- Severe tropical storm (JMA)
- Tropical storm (SSHWS)
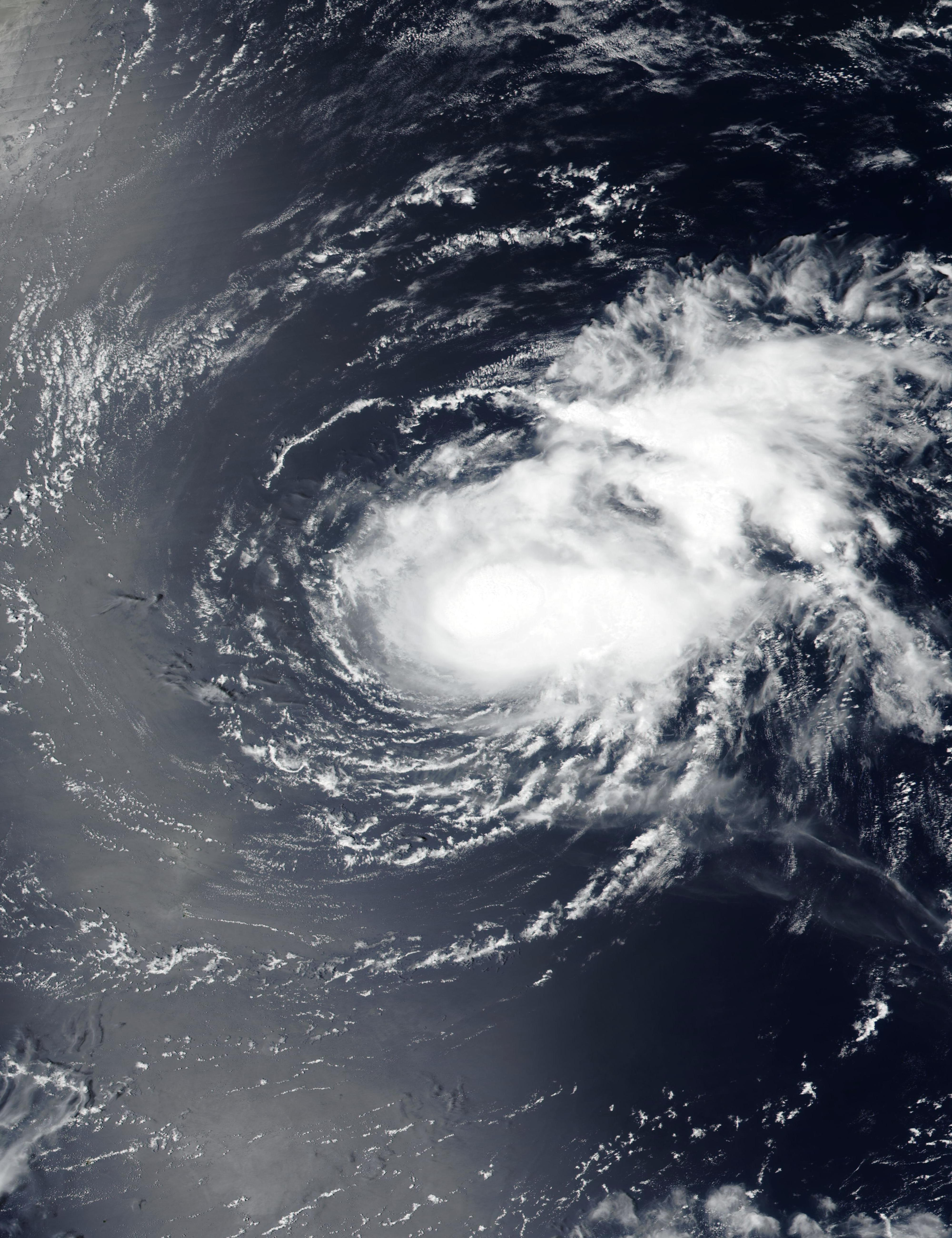
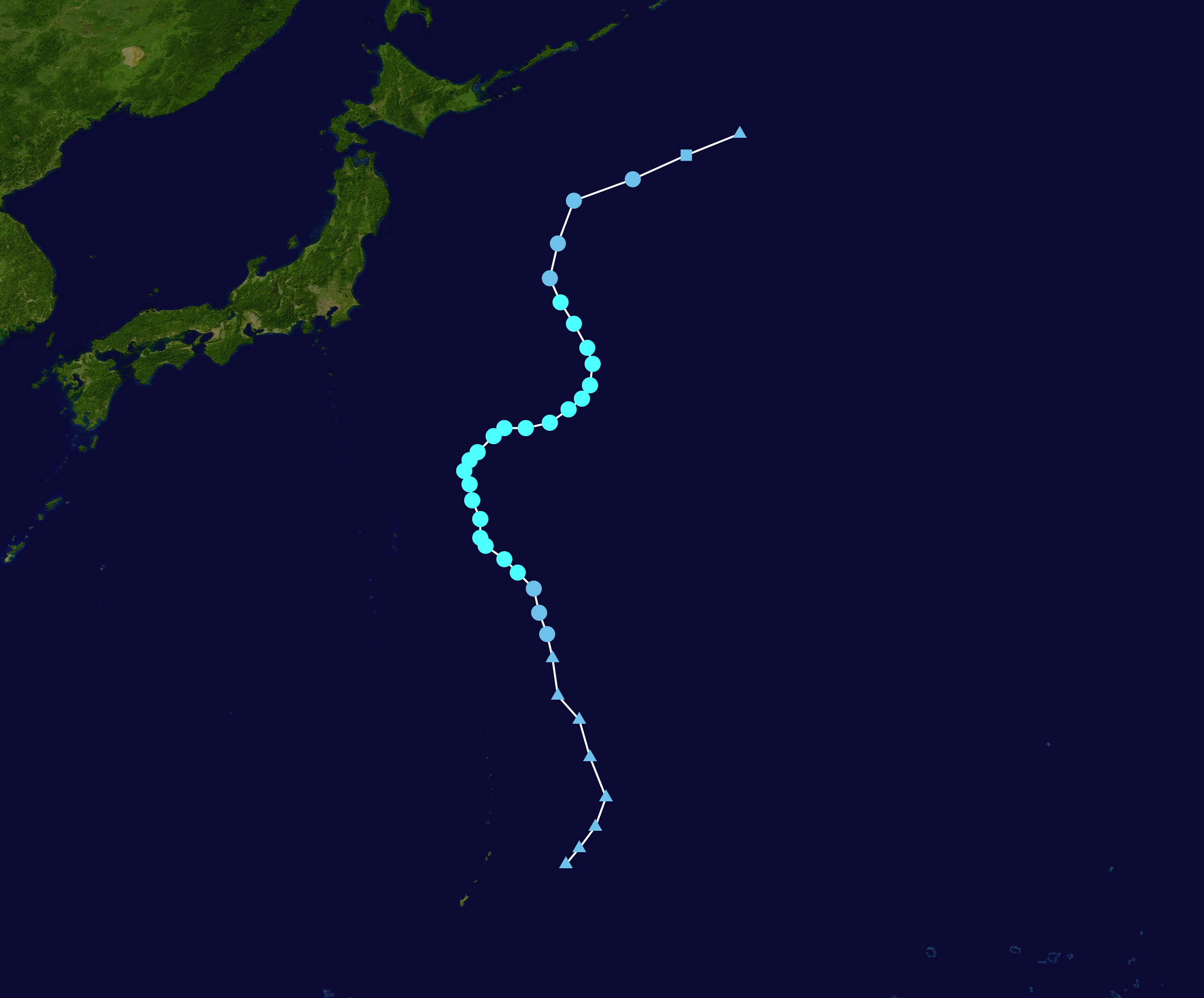
- Duration: July 1 – July 8
- Peak intensity: 95 km/h (60 mph) (10-min); 990 hPa (mbar)

On July 1, the JMA announced that a new tropical depression had developed near the Northern Mariana Islands. Later that day, the JTWC designated the system as a tropical depression, thereby designating it as 04W. Though its circulation was initially exposed, by July 2 the cyclone had intensified into a tropical storm, and it received the name Mun later that day. Early on July 3, Mun's convection waned as dry air disrupted the cyclone, though it began to recover later that day as deep convection returned. Mun later moved through unfavorable conditions, citing dry air environment, weak equatorward outflow aloft, high northeasterly windshear, which helped in degrading back into a tropical storm on July 7. The JTWC would later discontinue warnings with Mun on July 8 as it started to move through cooler waters, making its deep convection collapse.

=== Typhoon Danas (Bising) ===
- Typhoon (JMA)
- Category 4 typhoon (SSHWS)
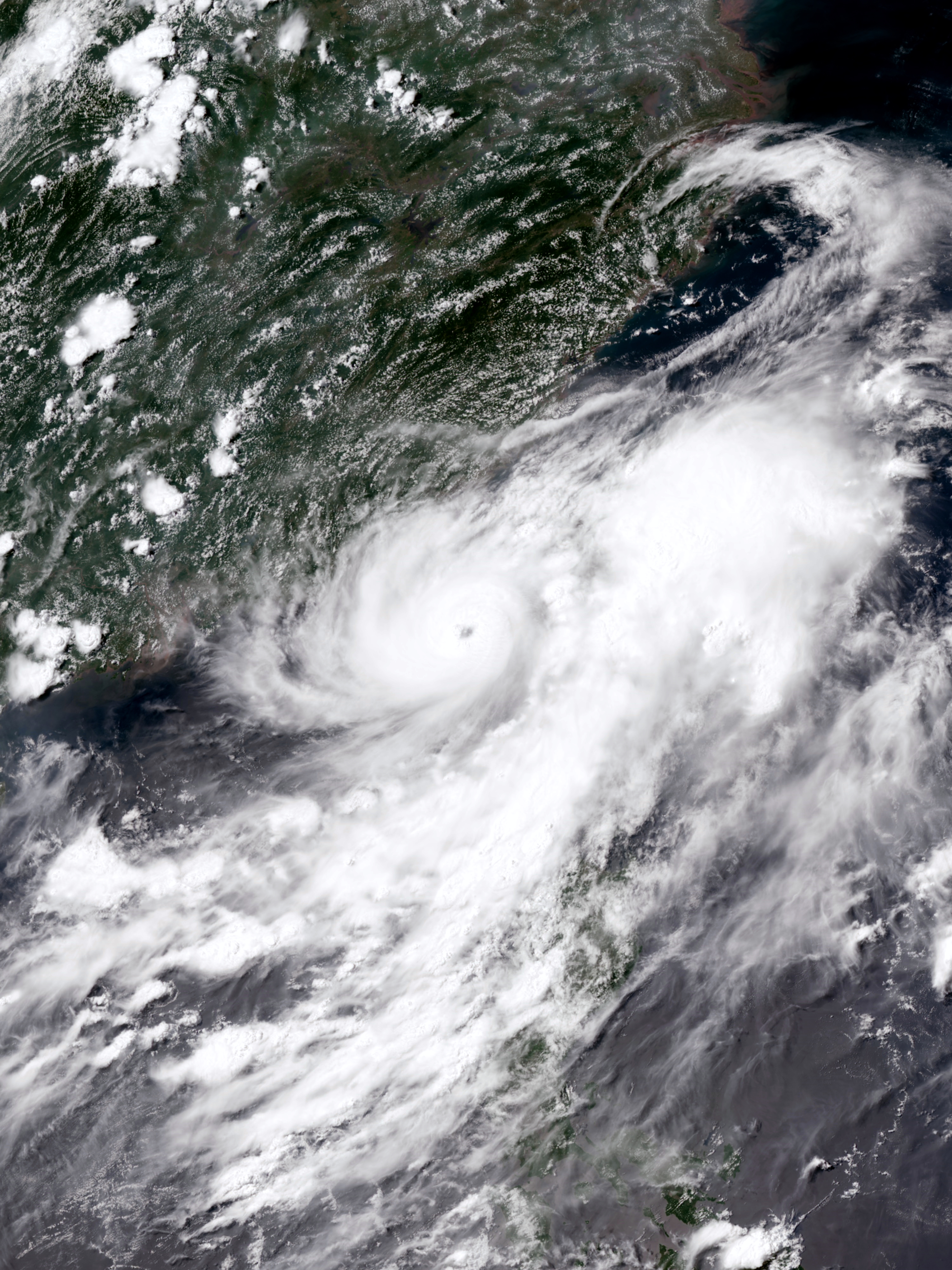
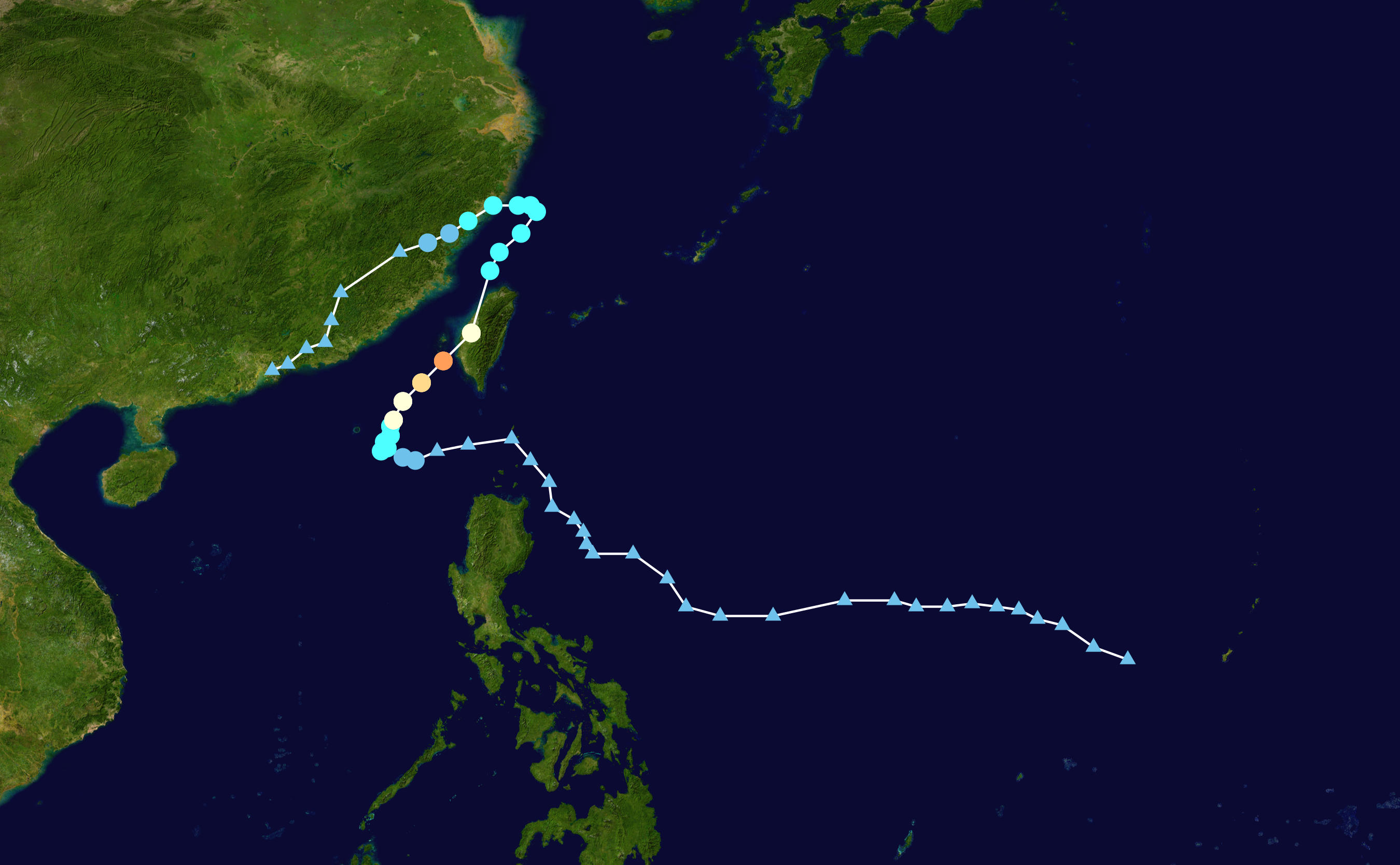
- Duration: July 3 – July 11
- Peak intensity: 140 km/h (85 mph) (10-min); 965 hPa (mbar)

Early on July 4, a tropical depression formed in the South China Sea, designated 05W by the JTWC and Bising by PAGASA. The JMA upgraded it to Tropical Storm Danas, and the storm continued to intensify as it moved to the north. At 15:40 UTC on July 6, Danas made landfall at peak intensity near Budai, Chiayi County, Taiwan, making it the first typhoon to make landfall on the western coast of the island since Typhoon Wayne in 1986. After traversing Taiwan, it weakened further. The storm made two more landfalls in Dongtou District, Wenzhou and Rui'an on July 8. After landfall, the storm later downgraded into a remnant low as it continued to move inland. The JMA continued to track the system until it issued its last warning on July 10.

Heavy rains from Danas and the southwest monsoon affected 13,006 people across 14 barangays in the Philippines, destroying one house and damaging 12 others, according to the National Disaster Risk Reduction and Management Council (NDRRMC). Twenty-three areas of Central Luzon reported flooding. At least 219 cities and municipalities suspended classes, while 36 suspended work. Two people died from the effects of the storm in Taiwan, while 726 others were injured. One person also died in the Philippines due to flooding caused by the storm.

=== Tropical Storm Nari ===
- Tropical storm (JMA)
- Tropical storm (SSHWS)
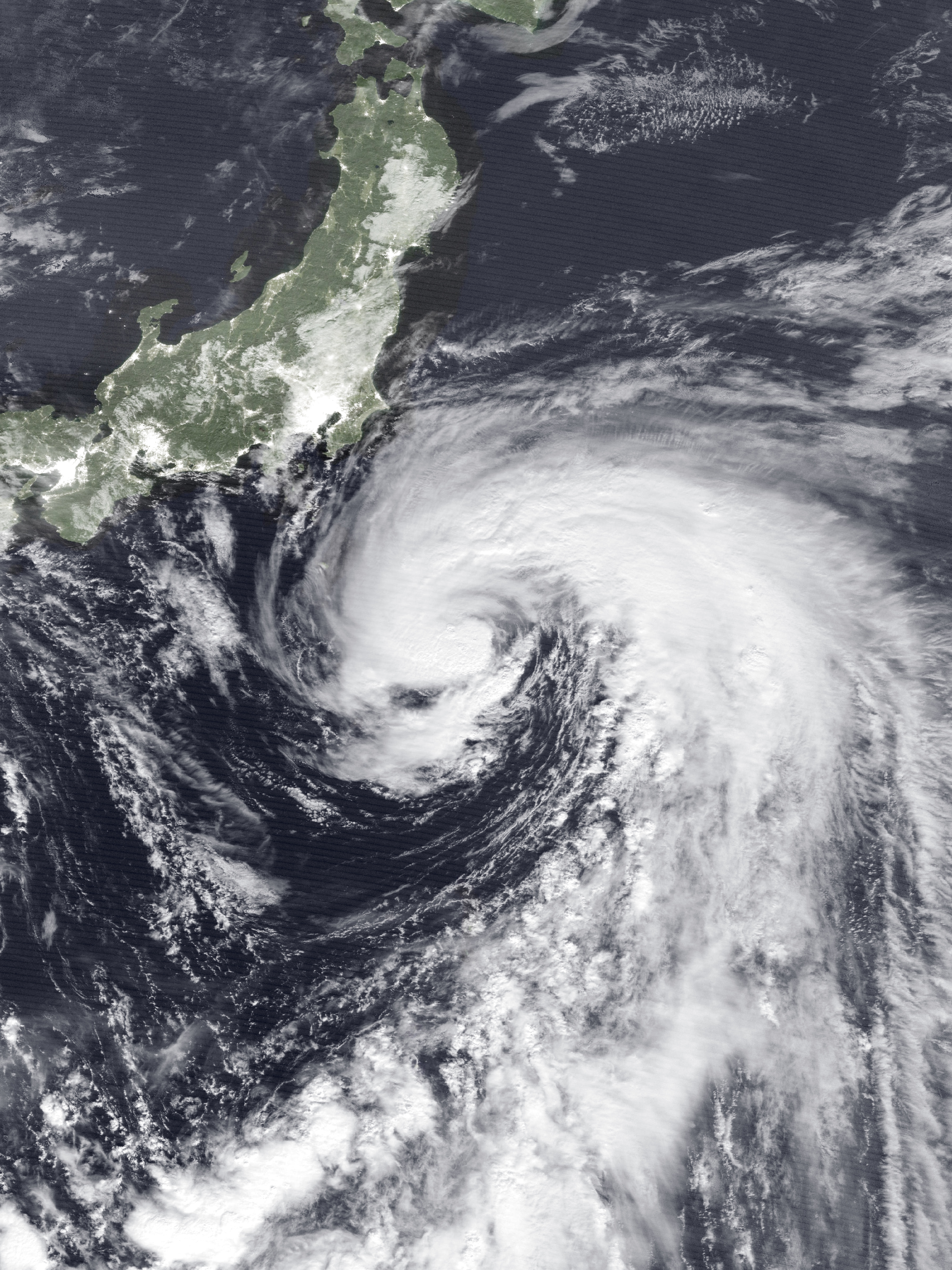
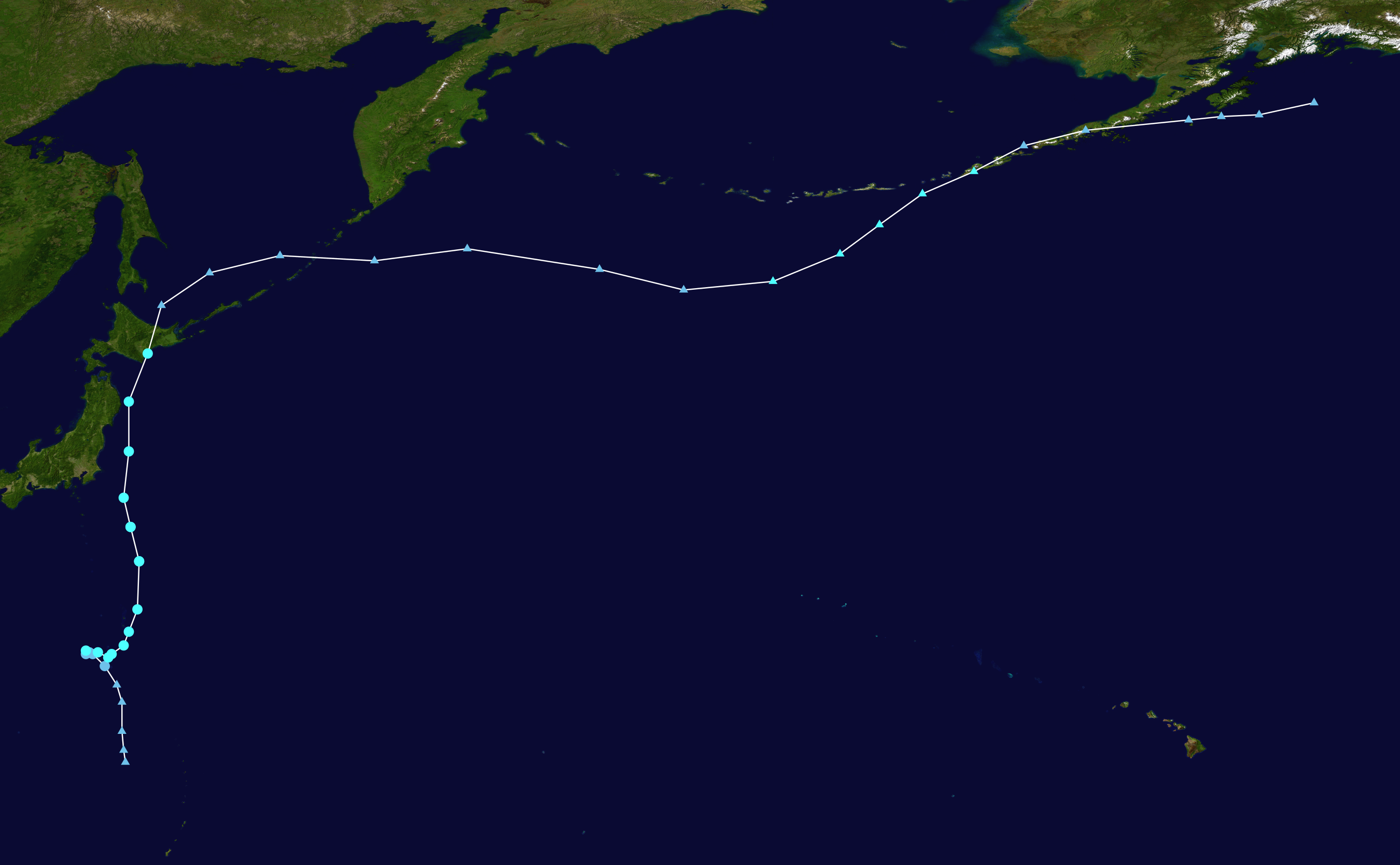
- Duration: July 9 – July 15
- Peak intensity: 85 km/h (50 mph) (10-min); 990 hPa (mbar)

A disturbance formed 100 km west of Iwo Jima on July 11 and was designated 06W by the JTWC. On the same day, the JMA followed suit and designated it as a tropical depression. On July 12, 06W later intensified into a tropical storm, which was named Nari by the JMA. Satellite imagery showed that Nari was partly obscured, with its deep convection developing to the east of the storm's center. Nari was upgraded into a severe tropical storm on July 13 as it continued to strengthen. However, another satellite imagery showed cloud bands spiraling around and getting shallower. Its deep convection also collapsed due to low sea surface temperatures near the edge of the Kuroshio Current. Nari transitioned into an extratropical cyclone on July 15 as it moved east-northeastward towards Hokkaido. At 02:00 that day, the storm made landfall near Cape Erimo at the southern tip of the island, the first time that a tropical cyclone made landfall in the prefecture since Tropical Storm Chanthu in 2016 and the first on record in July since 1951. The storm dissipated on July 15, prompting the JTWC to make its final advisory on that day.

Gusty winds, rough surf, and heavy rainfall were reported. A total of 144 mm (5.67 in) of rainfall was recorded in Mie Prefecture. Total economic damages caused by the storm exceeded US$1 million.

Despite having been listed operationally at peak intensity as a severe tropical storm, in JMA's post analysis on October 29, it was reassessed that Nari only reached its peak intensity as a tropical storm.

=== Tropical Depression 07W ===
- Tropical depression (JMA)
- Tropical depression (SSHWS)
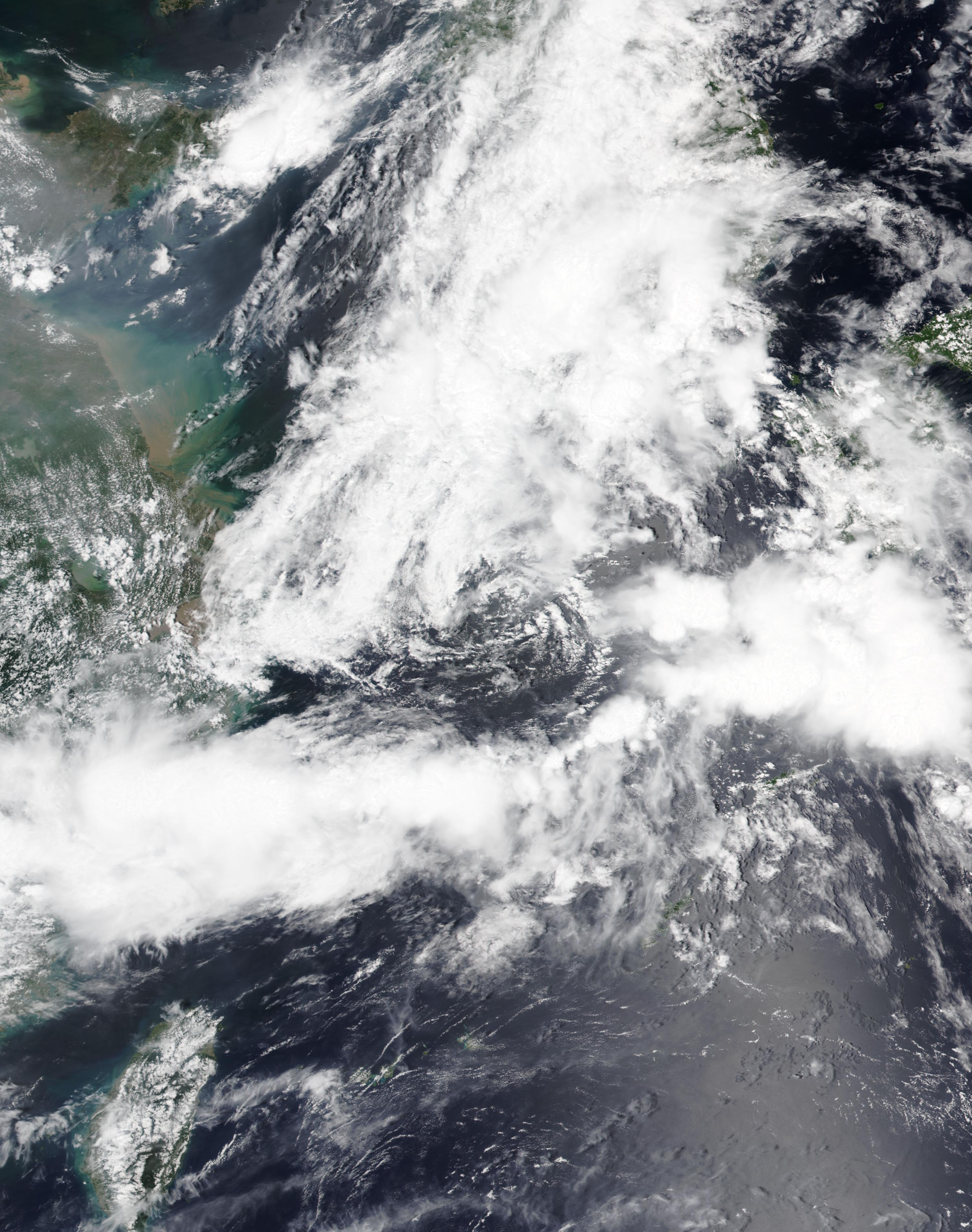
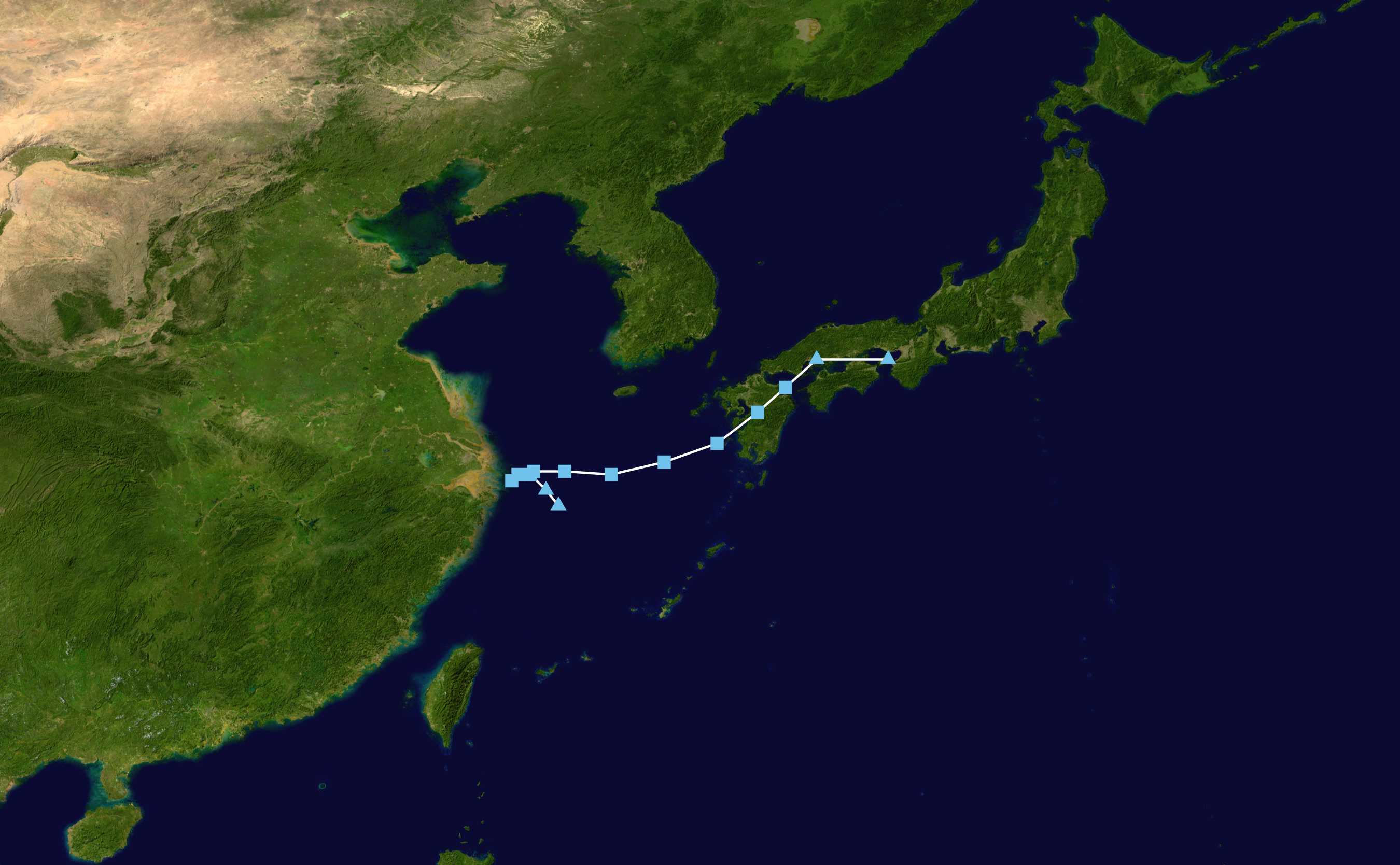
- Duration: July 11 – July 14
- Peak intensity: 55 km/h (35 mph) (10-min); 992 hPa (mbar)

The JTWC noted that a disturbance had developed in the East China Sea 328 km east of Shanghai on July 11. Later, the JMA upgraded it to a tropical depression at noon. The next day, the JTWC issued warnings on the system despite being a subtropical depression, designating it 07W. Over the next few days, the storm traveled east and made landfall over Kyushu on July 13 with a pressure of 992 hPa according to the JMA.

Heavy rains triggered by the depression injured two people in Kanagawa and damaged or flooded 23 homes in Miyazaki, Gifu, Nagano, Tokyo, Gunma, Kanagawa, and Fukushima Prefectures.

=== Severe Tropical Storm Wipha (Crising) ===
- Severe tropical storm (JMA)
- Category 1 typhoon (SSHWS)
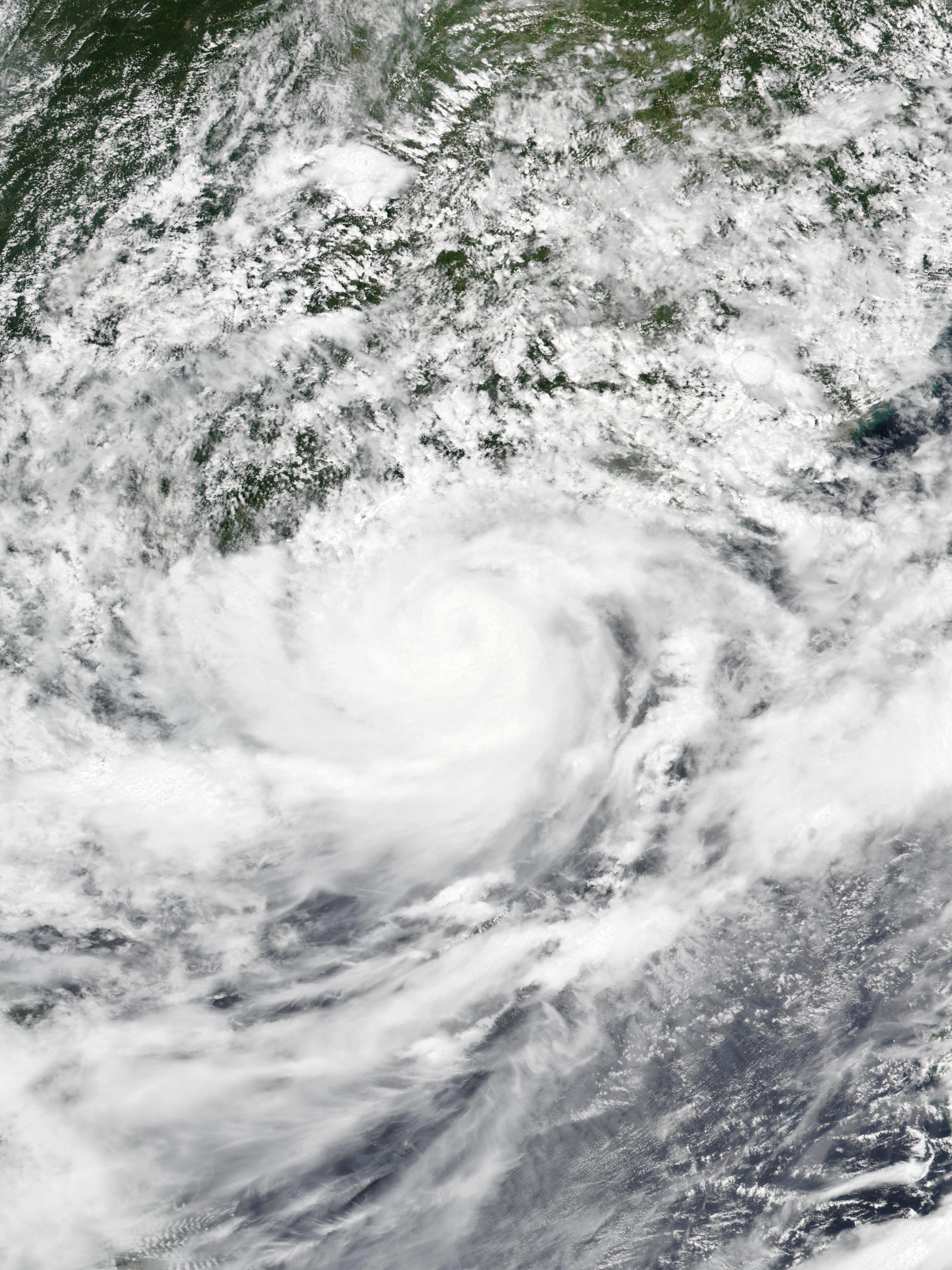
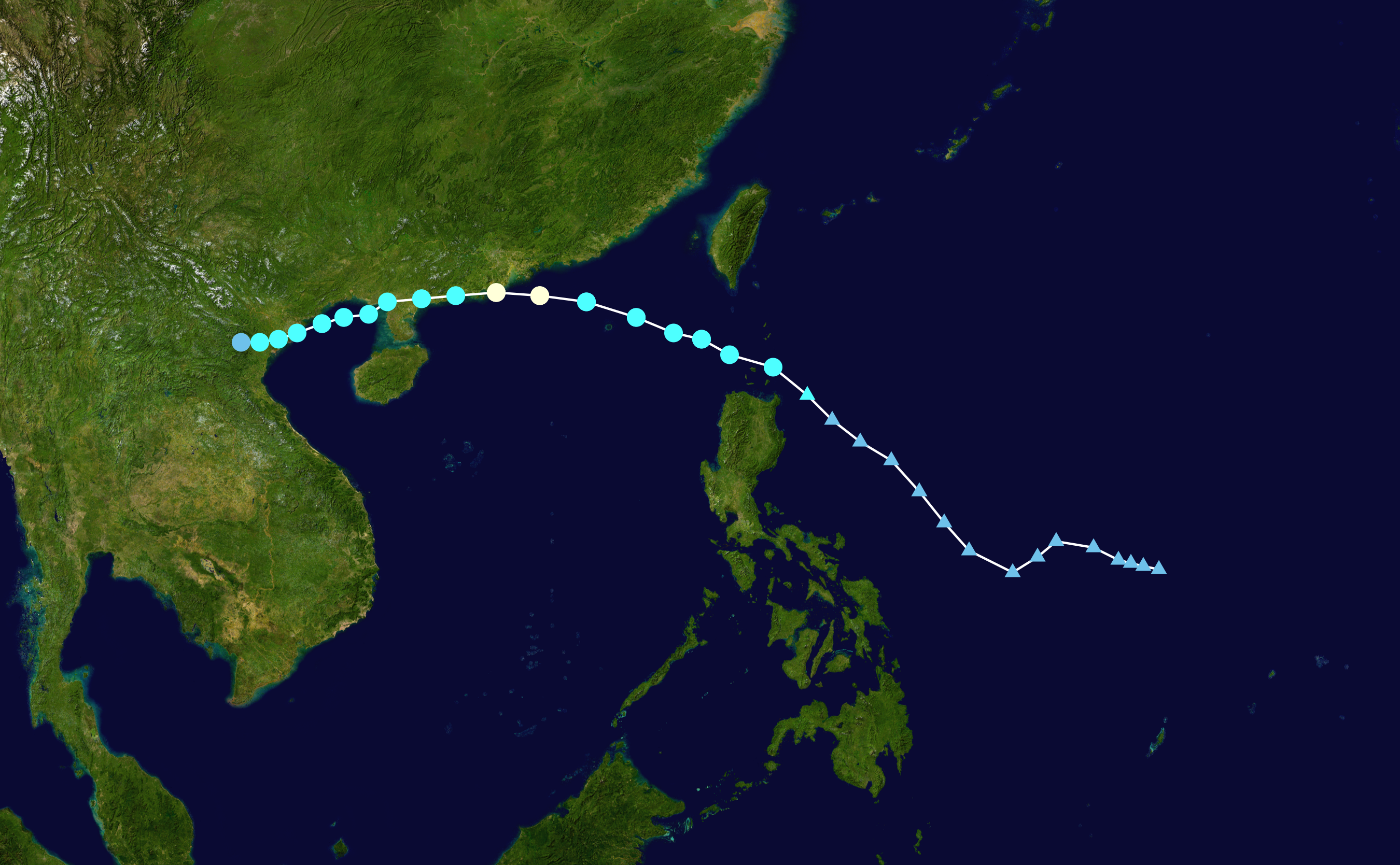
- Duration: July 16 – July 22
- Peak intensity: 110 km/h (70 mph) (10-min); 975 hPa (mbar)

A tropical depression formed on July 16 to the east of the Philippines, and was named Crising by PAGASA. The JTWC classified the system as a monsoon depression at first, but was later upgraded to Tropical Depression 09W on the following day. The depression strengthened into Tropical Storm Wipha on July 18. That day, the storm passed near Santa Ana, Cagayan and the Babuyan Islands. On July 19, Wipha became a severe tropical storm over the South China Sea, reaching peak winds of 110 mph (70 km/h) according to the JMA. The storm made landfall over Taishan in Guangdong Province, before crossing the Gulf of Tonkin and making another landfall in northern Vietnam. The JMA stopped tracking Wipha late on July 22.

Wipha enhanced the southwest monsoon, triggering floods in the Philippines and affecting over 9.5 million people. 40 fatalities, 33 injuries, and eight people missing were reported. In Hong Kong, the HKO raised Hurricane Signal No. 10, its highest warning level. At least 33 people were injured, 711 trees were reported downed, and 277 people were evacuated. Losses totaled to US$1.14 billion.

=== Severe Tropical Storm Co-May (Emong) ===
- Severe tropical storm (JMA)
- Category 1 typhoon (SSHWS)
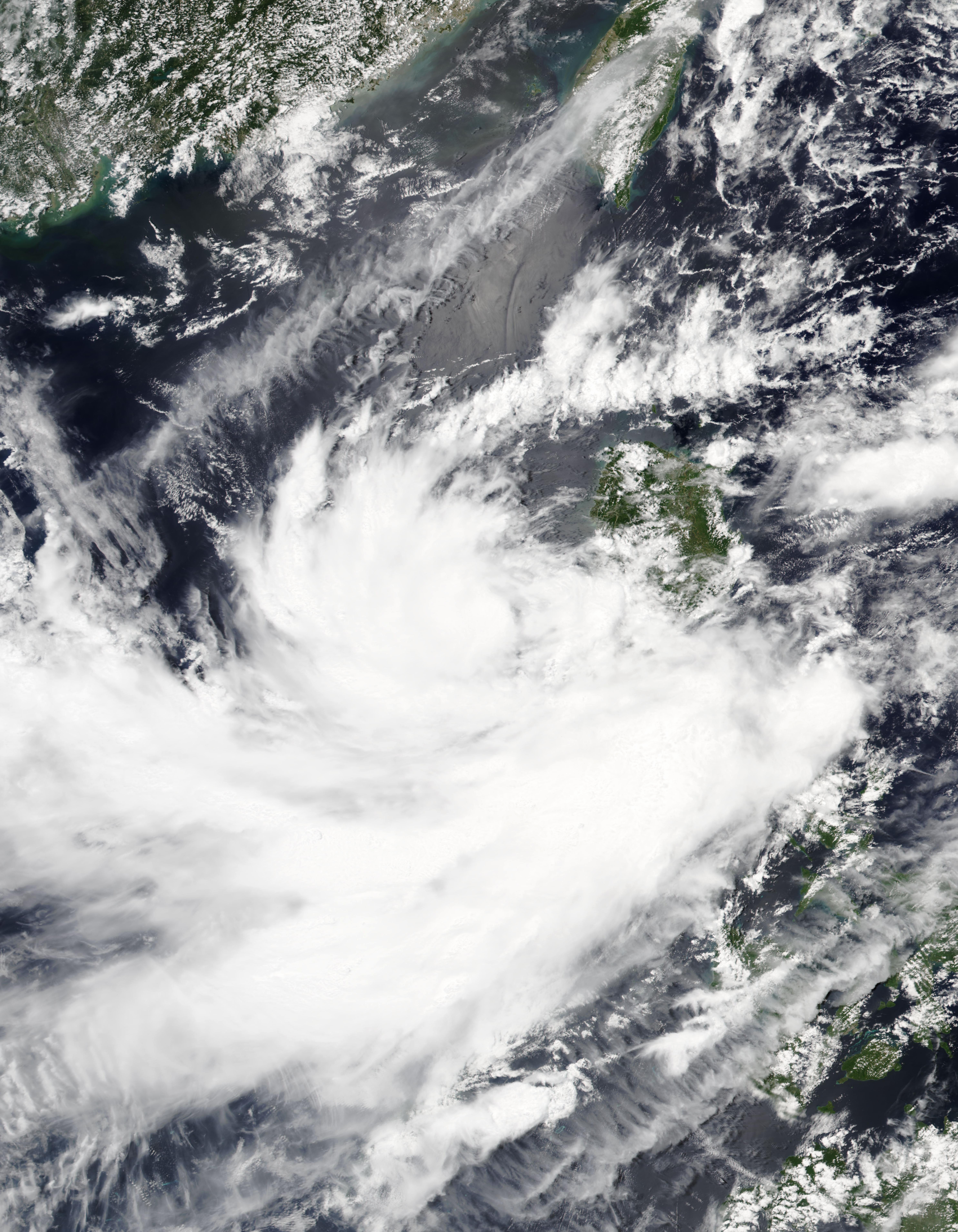
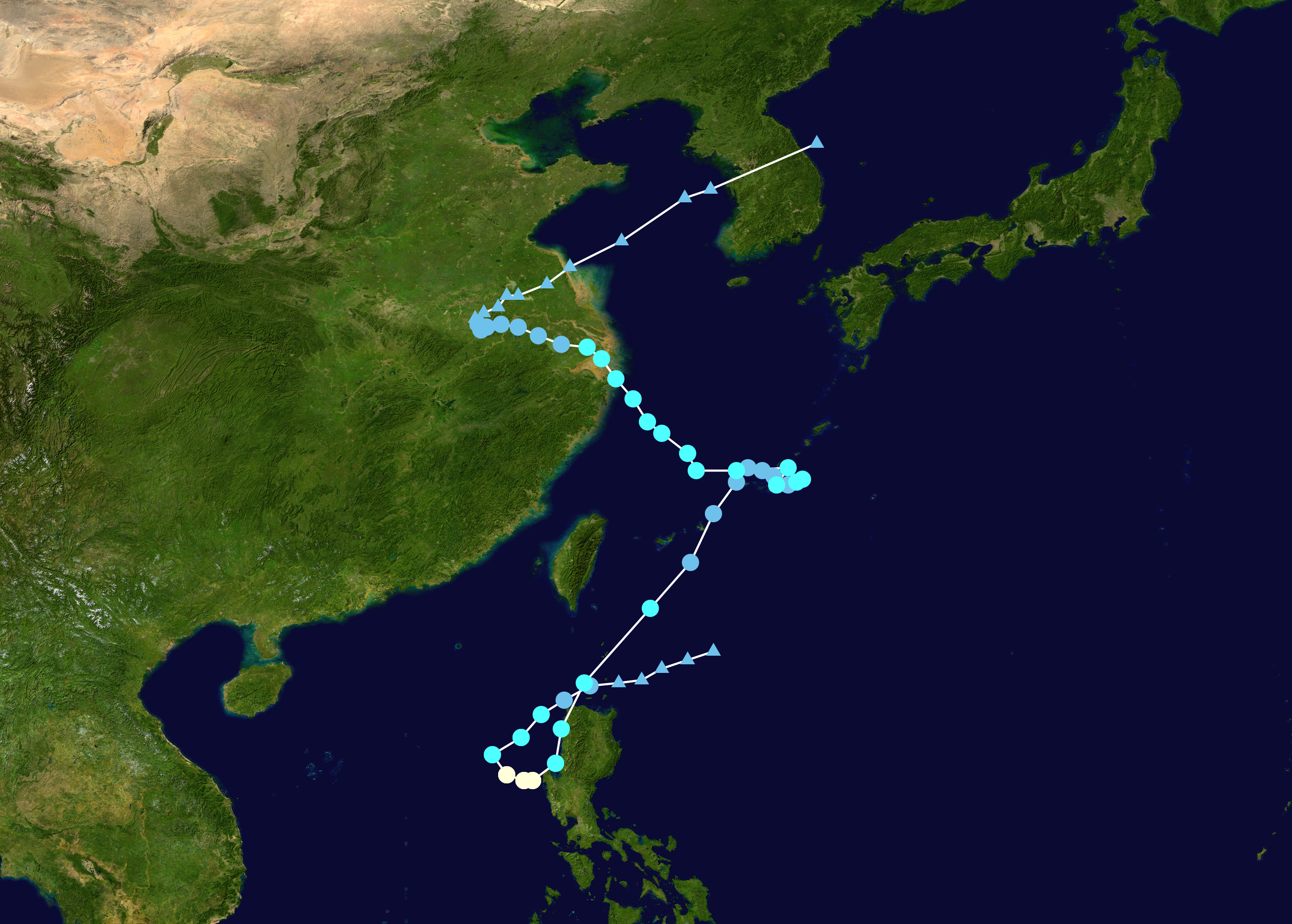
- Duration: July 22 – August 3
- Peak intensity: 110 km/h (70 mph) (10-min); 975 hPa (mbar)

A tropical depression formed on July 22 near the northern Philippines. Moving southwest, it slowly intensified, and the JMA upgraded it to Tropical Storm Co-May on July 23. PAGASA classified it as Emong. Due to a Fujiwhara effect with Francisco, Co-May looped back to the east. On July 24, Co-May reached peak winds of 110 km/h (70 mph) before making landfall on western Luzon near Agno, Pangasinan, the strongest to hit the province in 16 years. Co-may then made another landfall over Candon, Ilocos Sur before it quickly weakened, falling to tropical depression status over the Ryukyu Islands. However, Co-May restrengthened into a tropical storm near Okinawa on July 27. The storm moved back to the northwest without intensifying much. On July 29, Co-May moved ashore northeastern China and quickly weakened as it slowed over land. The JMA continued tracking the system until August 3, when the remnants of Co-May moved back over the East China Sea.

In the Philippines, Co-May caused flooding and wind damage, affecting over 49,000 people, with ₱163.59 million (US$3.32 million) in damages. At least 25 people died and 278,000 were displaced. Impacted areas included La Union, Alaminos, Pangasinan, and Naval Station Ernesto Ogbinar in San Fernando, La Union. Five were rescued in Burgos, Ilocos Norte, while flooding affected roads in Bauang. In China, flooding killed at least 30 people in Beijing and led to 283,000 evacuations in Shanghai. Losses totaled to US$42 million.

=== Tropical Storm Francisco (Dante) ===
- Tropical storm (JMA)
- Tropical storm (SSHWS)
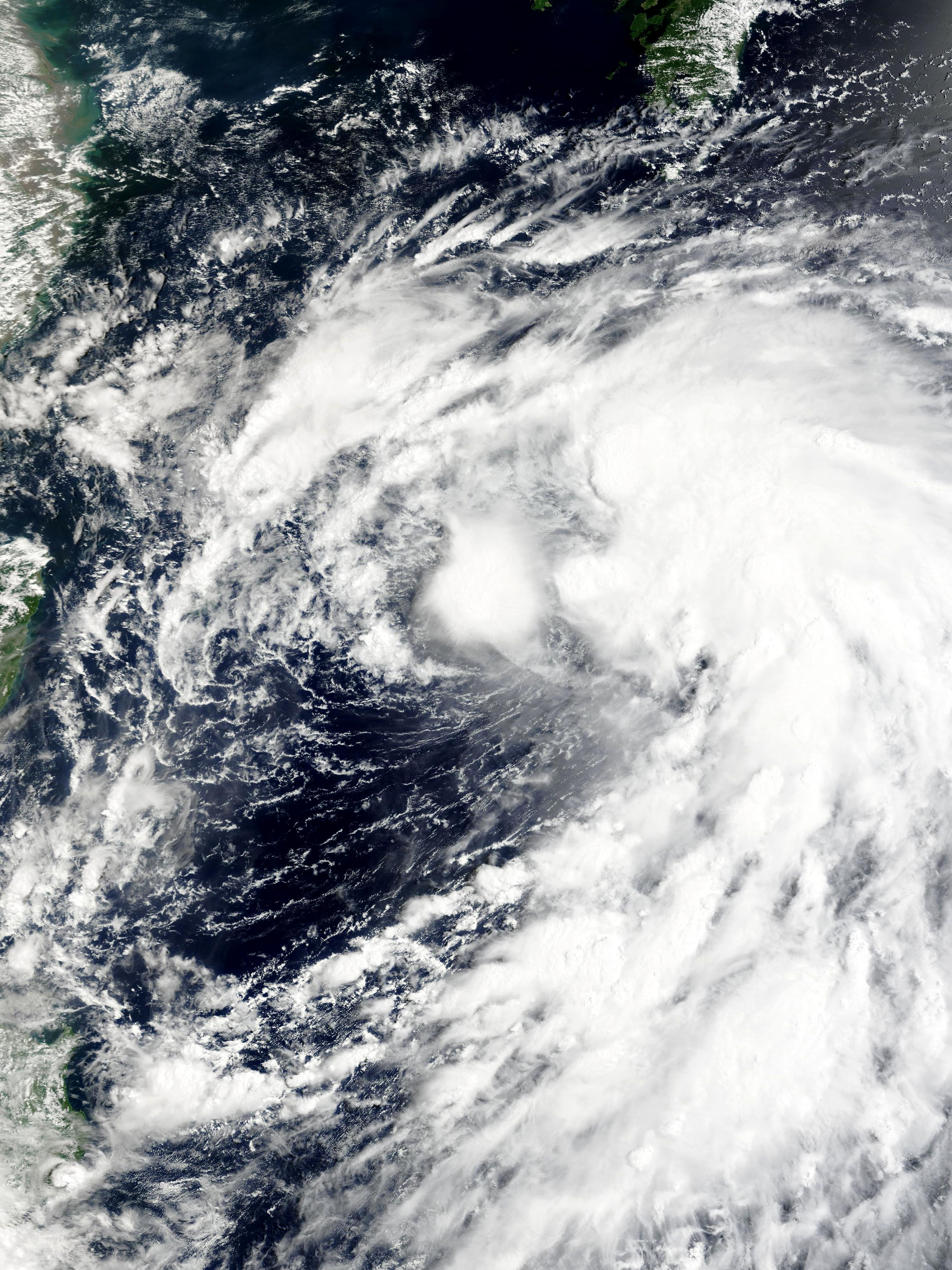
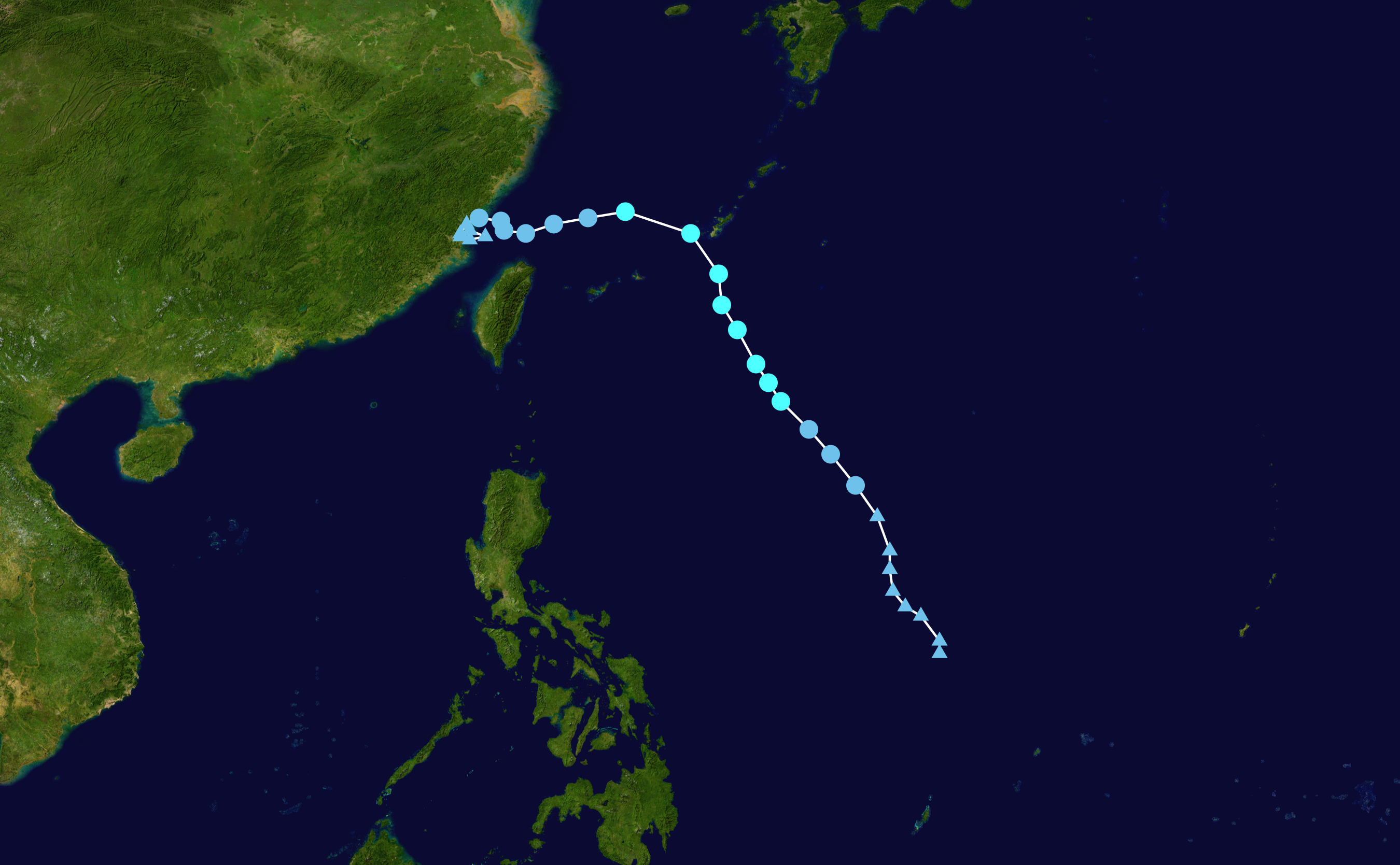
- Duration: July 22 – July 26
- Peak intensity: 75 km/h (45 mph) (10-min); 990 hPa (mbar)

On July 21, the JTWC first noted a low-pressure area south-southwest of Kadena Air Base. The JMA classified the system as a tropical depression on 06:00 UTC of July 22. The JTWC and PAGASA later did the same, with PAGASA assigning the local name Dante and the JTWC designating it as Tropical Depression 10W after initially issuing a TCFA. On July 23, the JMA, the JTWC, and PAGASA upgraded the system to a tropical storm, naming it Francisco, as it tracked north-northwestward.

The storm was steered by the pressure gradient between a subtropical ridge to the north and a monsoon gyre to the south. Satellite imagery showed a burst of deep convection over the storm's LLCC, briefly causing a northward wobble in its track as the vortex aligned beneath the convective canopy. Francisco subsequently turned westward towards northern Taiwan Strait, where dry mid-level air and weak outflow caused it to weaken back to a tropical depression, and then to a remnant low the following day.

Heavy rain and tropical-storm-force winds were reported in the Ryukyu Islands.

=== Typhoon Krosa ===
- Typhoon (JMA)
- Category 1 typhoon (SSHWS)
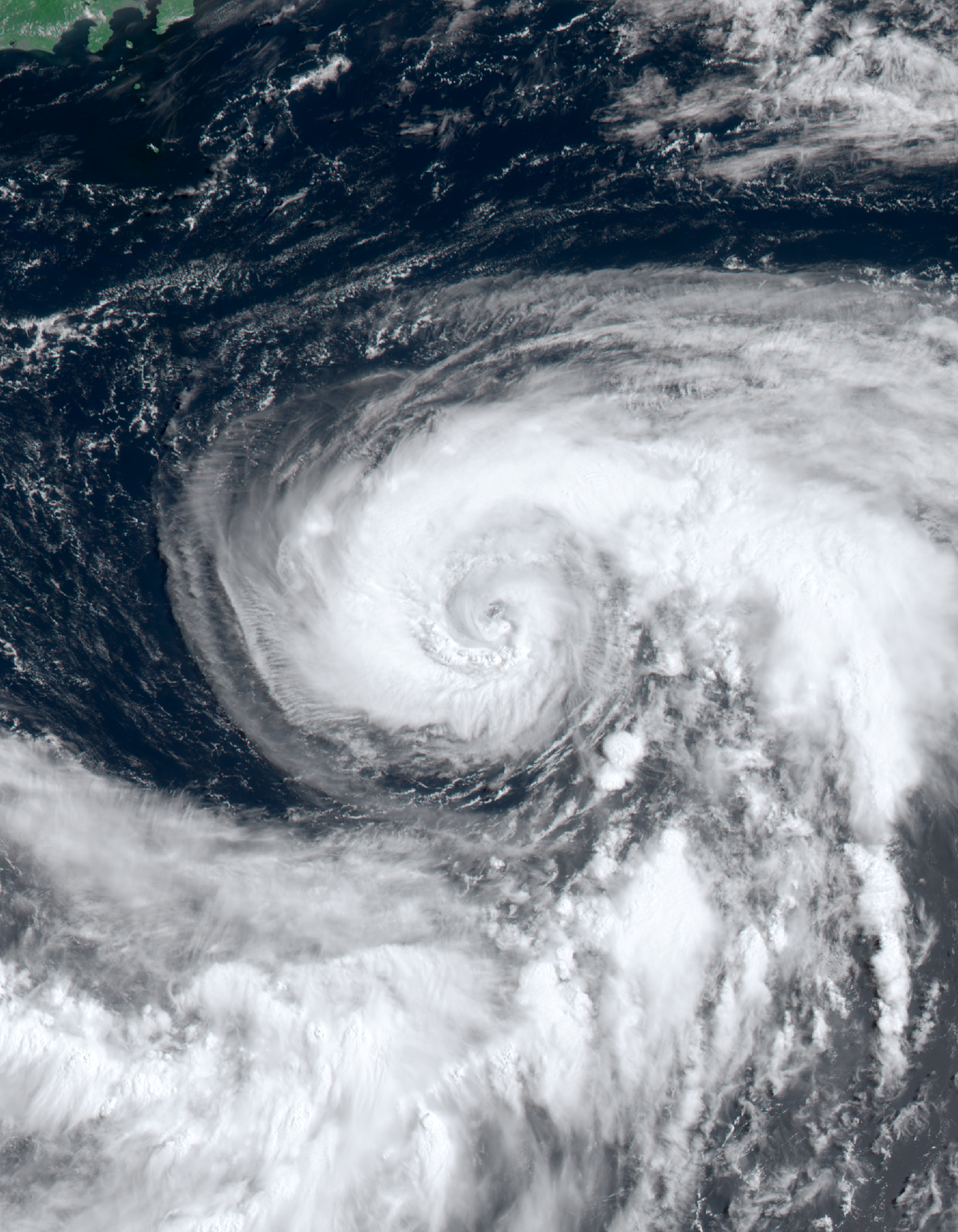
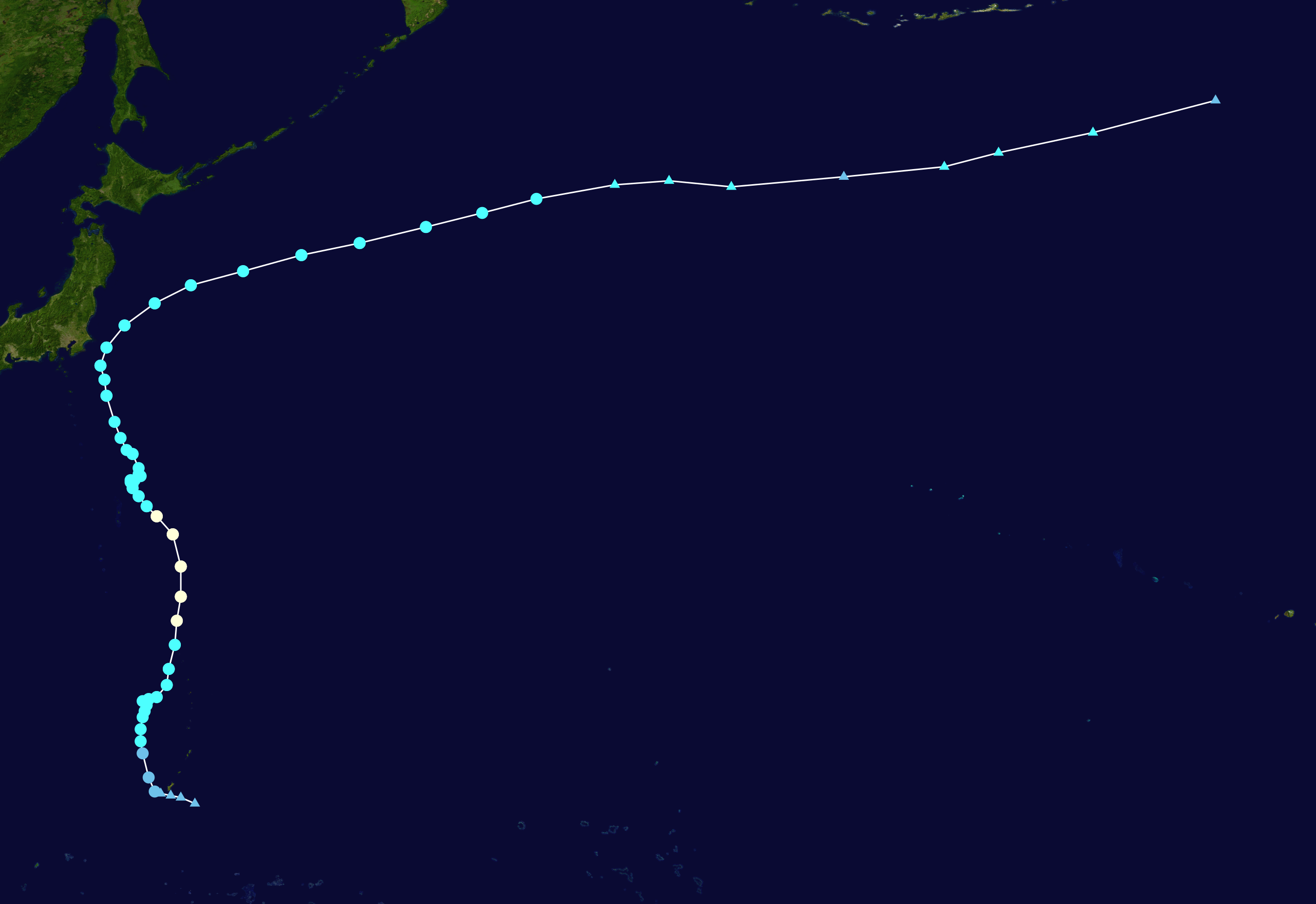
- Duration: July 23 – August 4
- Peak intensity: 140 km/h (85 mph) (10-min); 965 hPa (mbar)

On July 21, the JTWC began monitoring a disturbance that had formed near Guam under marginally favorable environmental conditions. The system slowly consolidated over the following days. On July 23, the JTWC issued a TCFA for the system, and a few hours later, it was designated as Tropical Depression 12W. The following day, the JMA assigned the system the name Krosa. As its convection began to organize, the JMA upgraded Krosa to severe tropical storm intensity. On July 27, the JMA upgraded Krosa to a typhoon, with JTWC later following suit; however, it weakened into a severe tropical storm on July 28 and then further weakened into a tropical storm on July 30, and then re-strengthened into severe tropical storm on the following day. Krosa maintained its strength due to marginally favorable environmental conditions despite its fully exposed, ragged LLCC. Krosa deteriorated back again into a tropical storm for the second time on August 3 due to increasing vertical wind shear with cooler waters. On August 4, Krosa would undergo extratropical transition as it crossed into the baroclinic zone to the north.

=== Tropical Storm Bailu ===
- Tropical storm (JMA)
- Tropical storm (SSHWS)
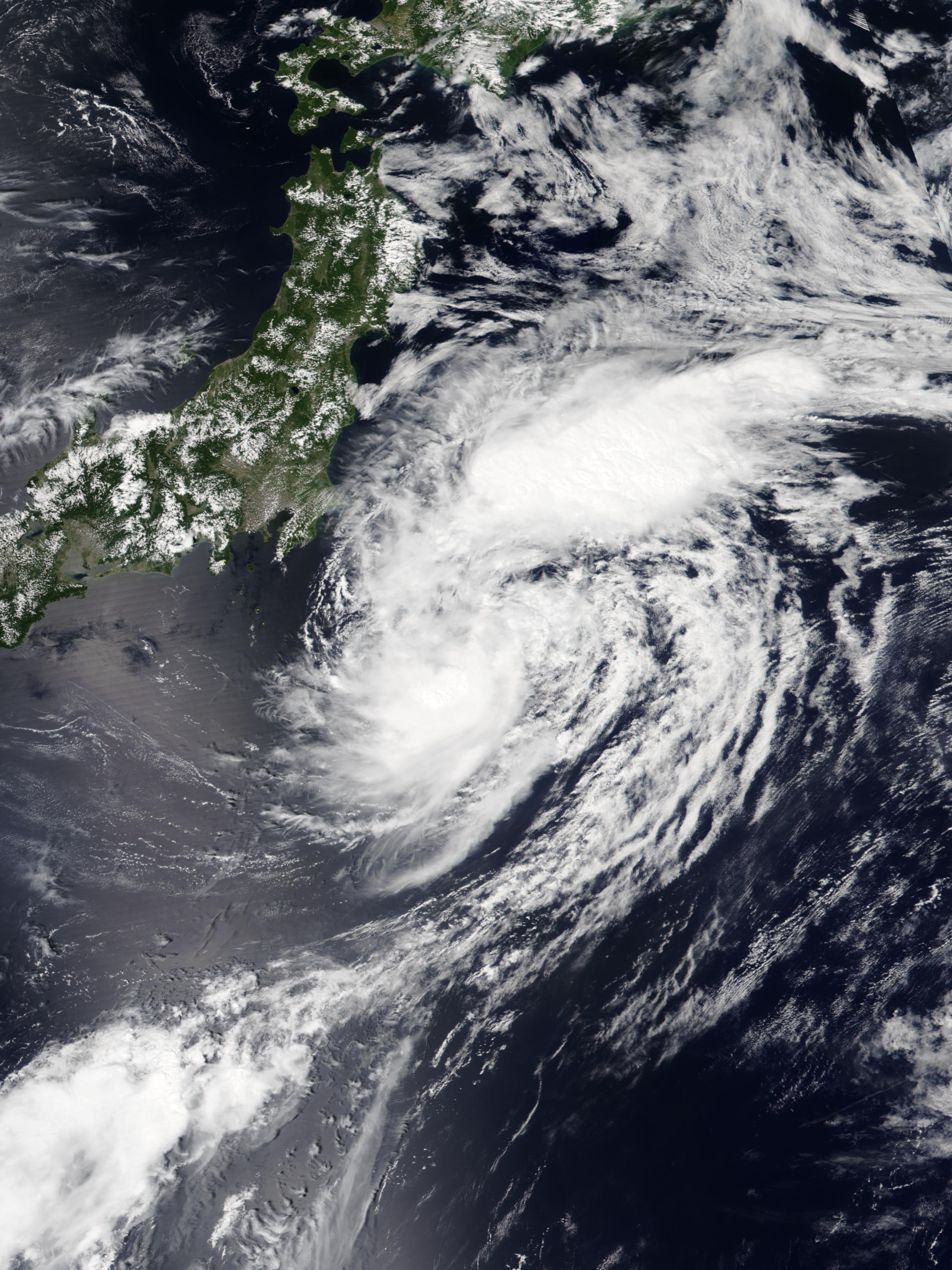
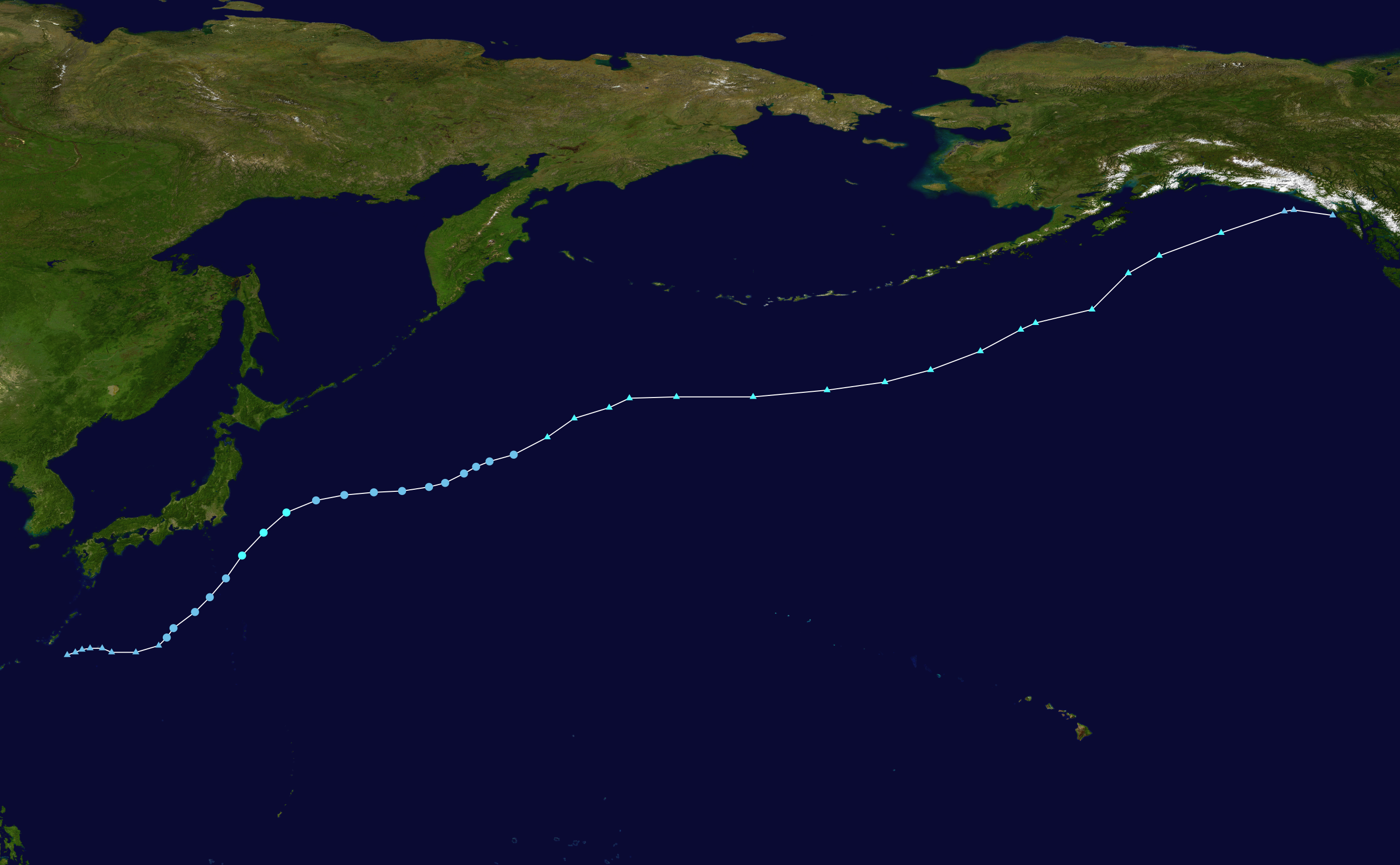
- Duration: July 30 – August 5
- Peak intensity: 65 km/h (40 mph) (10-min); 994 hPa (mbar)

A tropical depression developed southeast of Okinawa Island on July 31. On August 1, the JTWC issued a TCFA for the system, citing the potential for tropical cyclogenesis in the coming days. By the next day, the JTWC designated the system as Tropical Depression 13W. In the early hours of August 3, both the JMA and the JTWC upgraded 13W to a tropical storm, with the former assigning the name Bailu. Satellite imagery at the time indicated a slowly consolidating LLCC, although the system remained asymmetric. Several smaller vortices were observed merging, accompanied by intermittent convection along the storm's periphery. Bailu was embedded in a marginally favorable environment, characterized by elevated atmospheric moisture, warm sea surface temperatures of 27–28 °C (81–82 °F), low vertical wind shear (5–10 knots), and moderate poleward outflow. However, as Bailu turned eastward, it struggled to sustain convection due to less favorable environmental conditions, weakening into a tropical depression on August 4. By August 6, the system had transitioned into an extratropical low after crossing the baroclinic zone and tracking east-northeastward. Shortwave infrared imagery confirmed the completion of its extratropical transition, with wind speeds dropping below 45 km/h (24 kn) as the process concluded.

=== Typhoon Podul (Gorio) ===
- Typhoon (JMA)
- Category 2 typhoon (SSHWS)
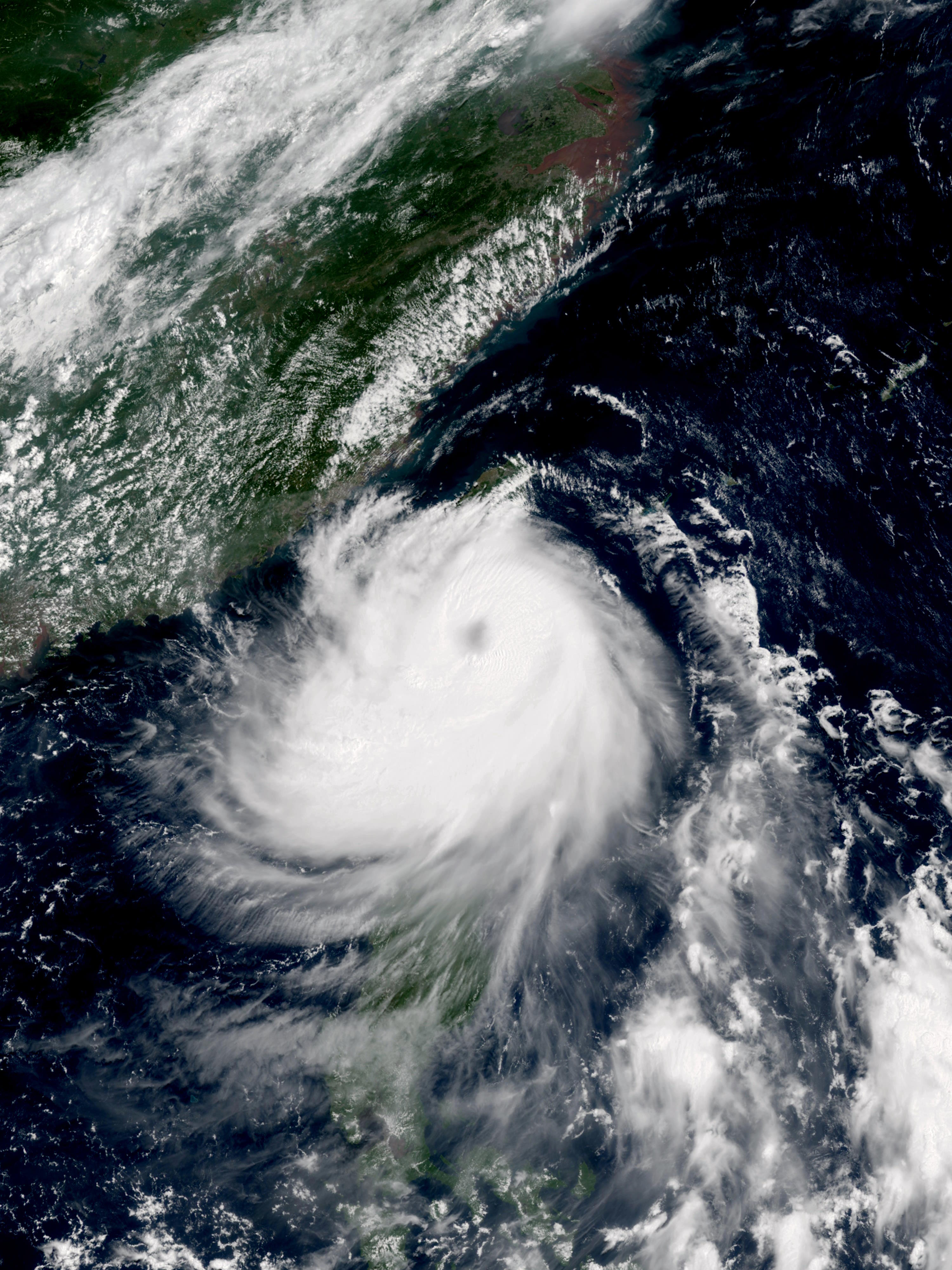
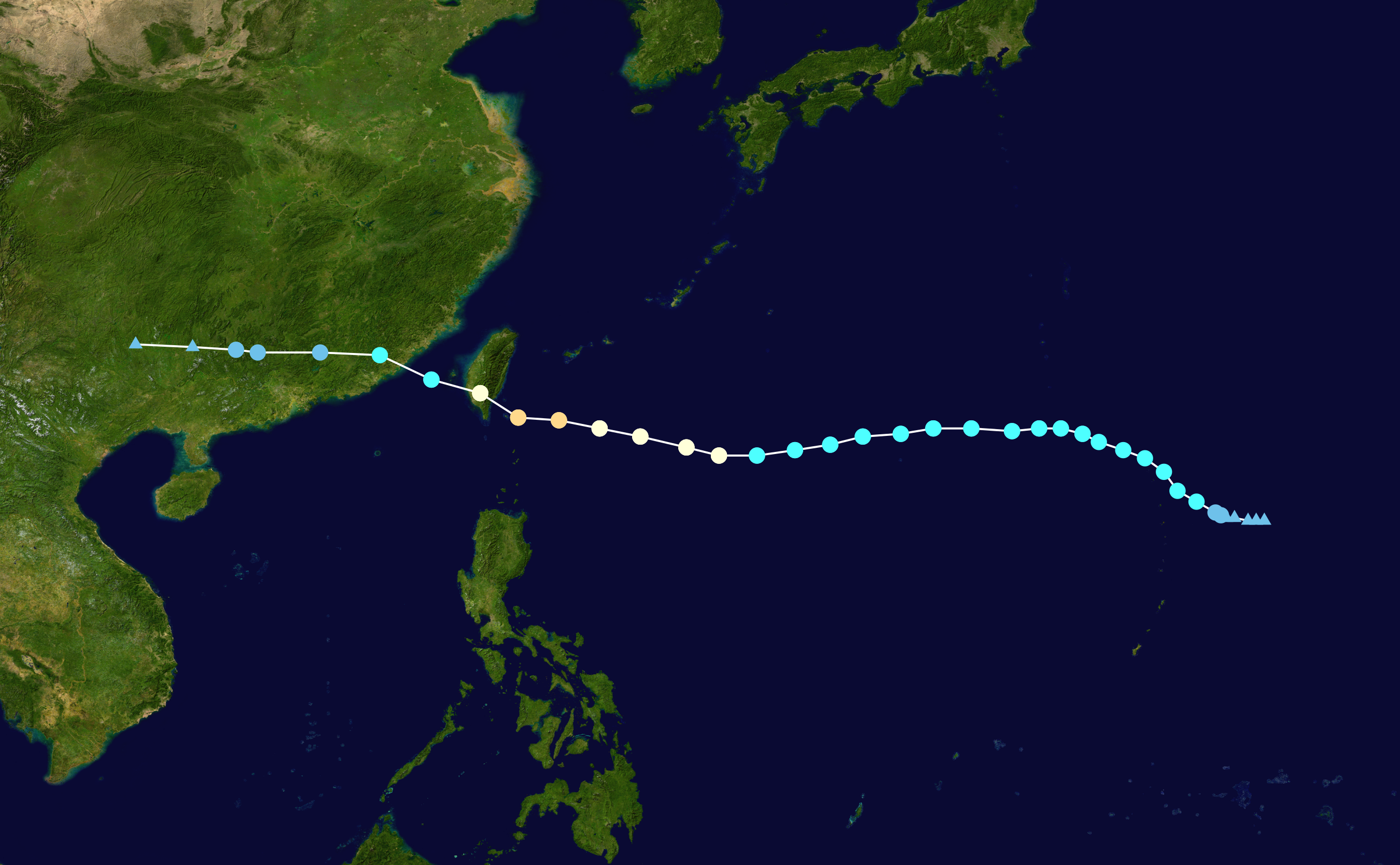
- Duration: August 5 – August 15
- Peak intensity: 150 km/h (90 mph) (10-min); 960 hPa (mbar)

On August 6, the JTWC began monitoring a convective area 230 nautical miles (430 km) northeast of Saipan, which was later classified as a tropical depression by the JMA. The JTWC issued a TCFA the following day and designated it as 16W. The system was upgraded to a tropical storm and named Podul by the JMA on August 8. Despite initial disruption from northeasterly vertical wind shear, Podul gradually organized, and the JMA upgraded it to a typhoon on August 9. That same day, it entered the PAR and was named Gorio by the PAGASA. The JTWC followed suit, upgrading Podul to a typhoon later that day, citing improved convective structure despite dry air intrusion. On August 13, Podul made landfall in Taimali, Taitung County in Taiwan at 13:00 TST (05:00 UTC) as a Category 2-equivalent typhoon. Podul then crossed through the Central Mountain Range, weakening significantly before it emerged over the Taiwan Strait. The storm made a second landfall in Zhangpu, Fujian Province at 01:00 CST (17:00 UTC) before weakening inland.

In Taiwan, Podul left one person missing, 112 injured, and displaced 8,024 residents. A man in Kaohsiung was killed after falling while repairing a storm-damaged roof. At Taoyuan International Airport, a UPS Airlines Boeing 747 suffered an engine pod strike while landing amid wind shear, prompting a temporary closure of the north runway for repairs and debris removal.

=== Tropical Depression 17W ===
- Tropical depression (JMA)
- Tropical storm (SSHWS)
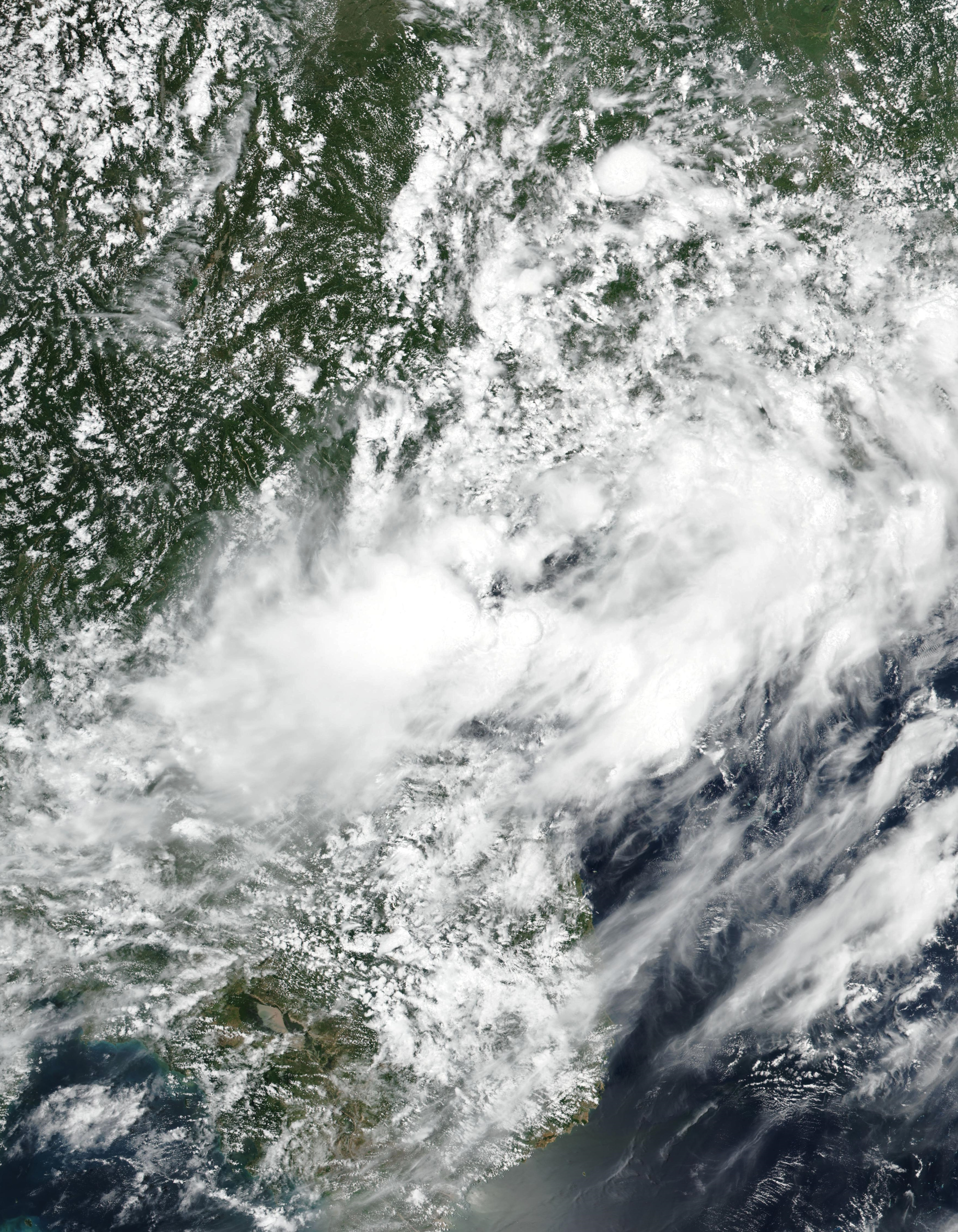
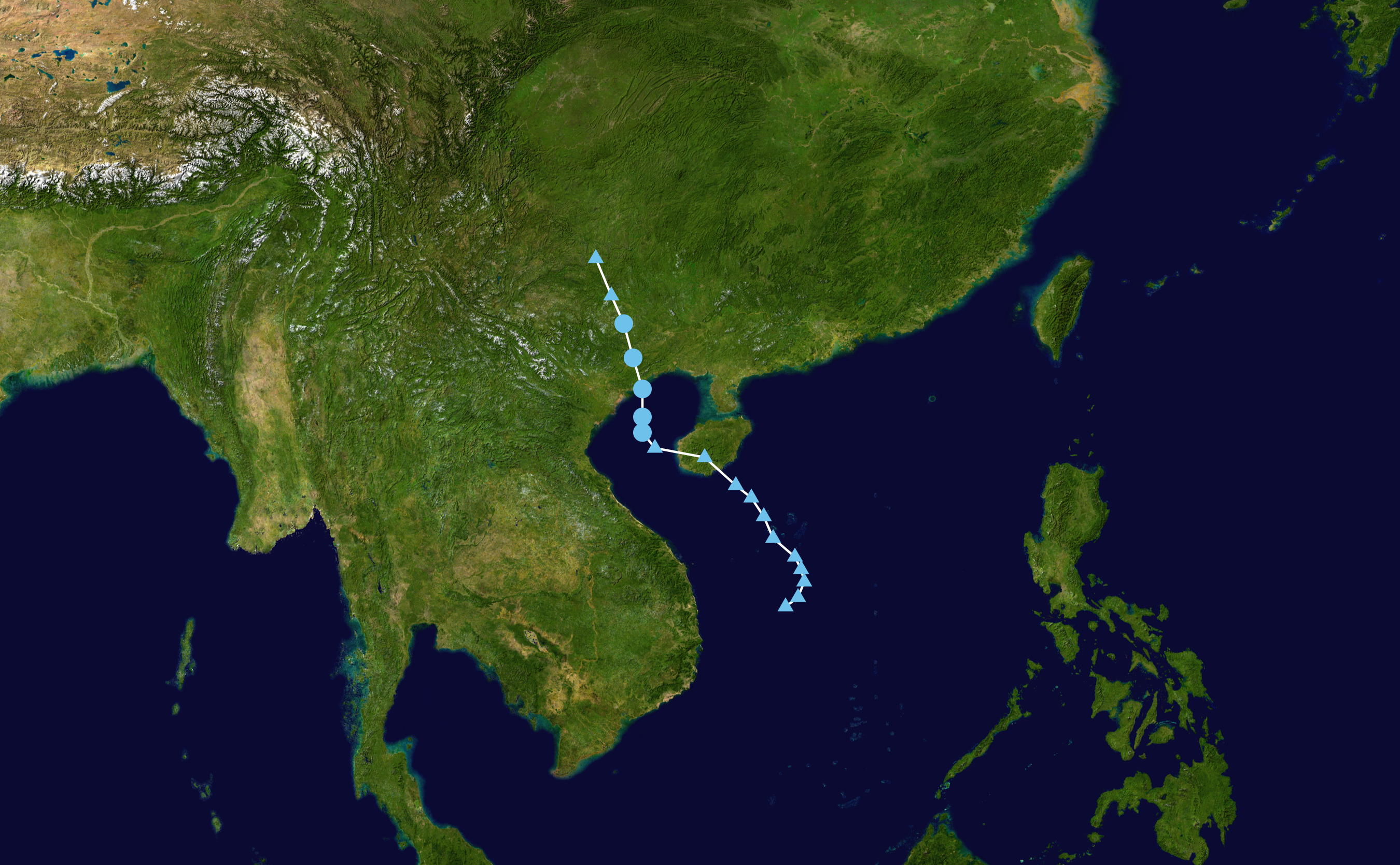
- Duration: August 17 – August 19
- Peak intensity: 55 km/h (35 mph) (10-min); 1000 hPa (mbar)

On August 16, Vietnam's National Center for Hydro-Meteorological Forecasting (NCHMF), the China Meteorological Administration (CMA), and the Hong Kong Observatory (HKO) reported the formation of a tropical depression over the South China Sea. (Note: Vietnamese: Biển Đông, literally meaning the East Sea) The NCHMF issued its first warning at 20:00 ICT (13:00 UTC), followed by the HKO at 21:30 HKT (13:30 UTC). At 21:00 MST (13:00 UTC) and 22:20 HKT (14:20 UTC), Macau's Meteorological and Geophysical Bureau (SMG) and the HKO both issued Standby Signal No. 1. The HKO later replaced this with the Strong Monsoon Signal at 20:20 HKT (12:20 UTC) on August 17, whereas the SMG upgraded to Strong Wind Signal No. 3 at 12:00 MST (04:00 UTC) the same day.

The JMA began monitoring the system on August 17. The JTWC later classified the system as a monsoon depression, noting its broad circulation with stronger winds on the eastern side and a poorly defined center. On August 18, the agency issued a TCFA, citing favorable conditions in the Gulf of Tonkin, and later upgraded the disturbance to a tropical depression and designating it 17W. That evening, 17W made landfall over Quảng Ninh, Vietnam, before weakening inland; the JTWC issued its final advisory the following day.

In Hong Kong, a Red Rainstorm Warning Signal was issued during the early hours of August 18, prompting the Education Bureau to suspend morning and full-day classes across the territory.

=== Tropical Storm Lingling (Huaning) ===
- Tropical storm (JMA)
- Tropical storm (SSHWS)
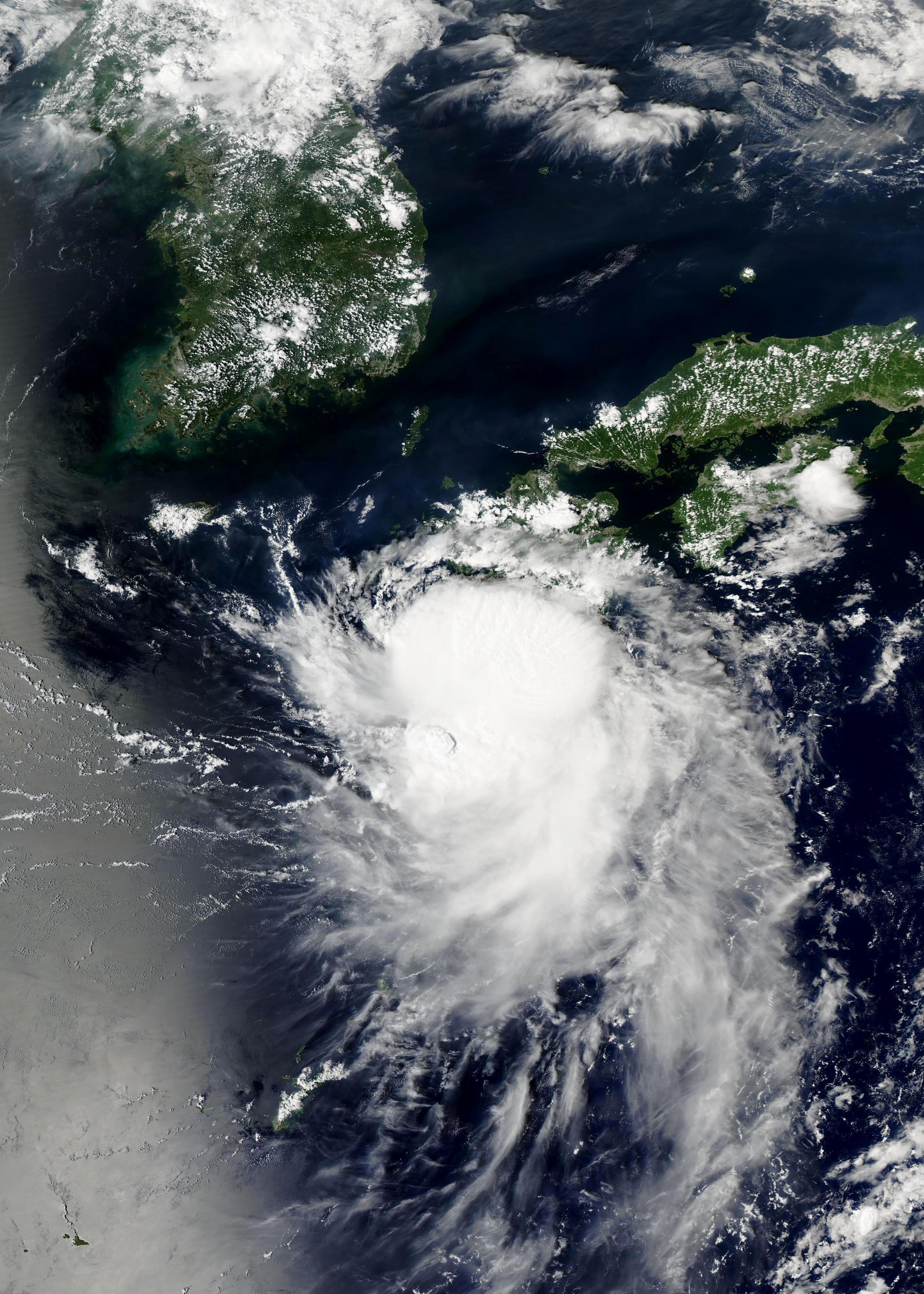
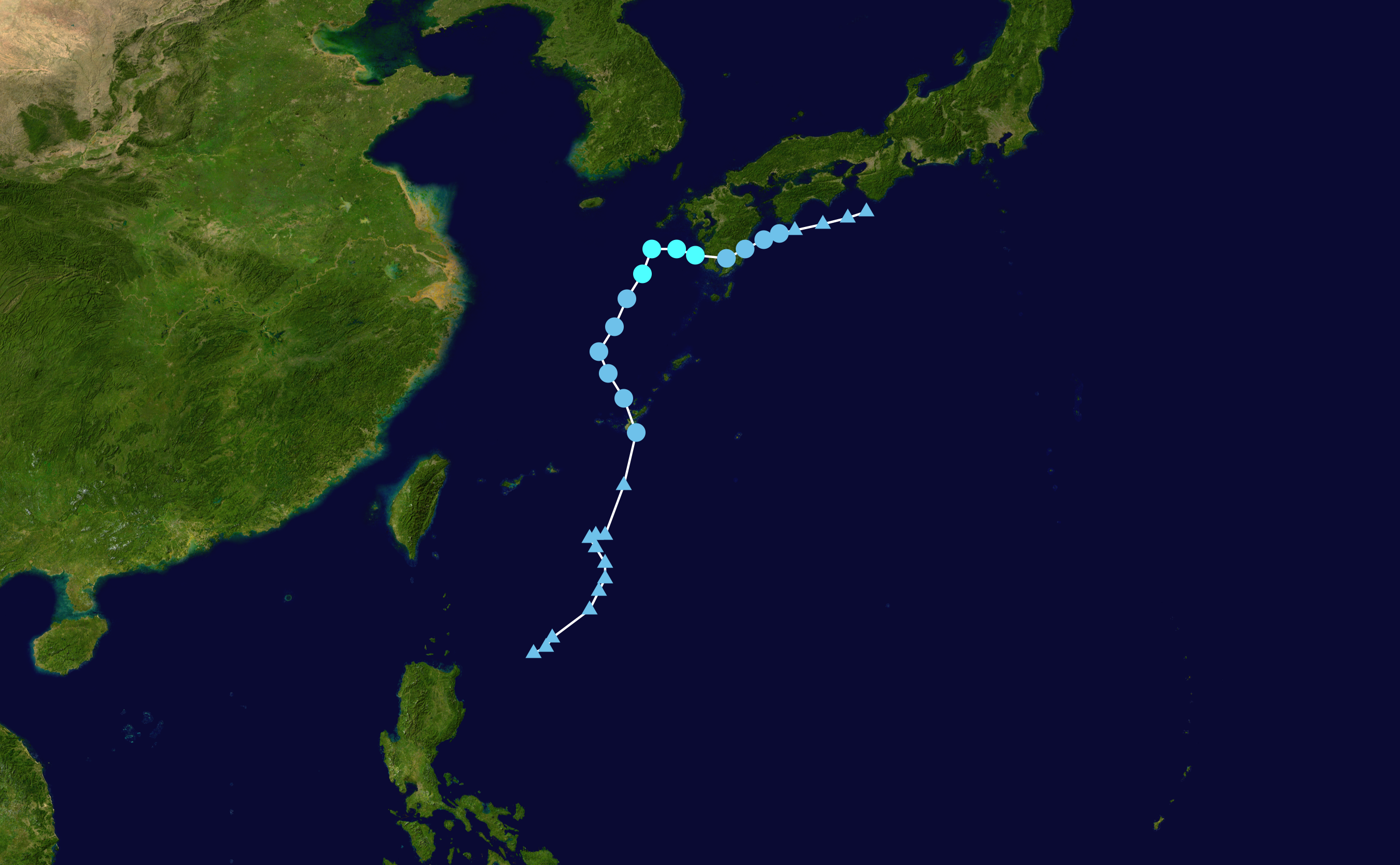
- Duration: August 17 – August 23
- Peak intensity: 85 km/h (50 mph) (10-min); 994 hPa (mbar)

On August 16, the JTWC began monitoring an area of convection about 305 nautical miles (565 km) south-southwest of Kadena Air Base, noting marginal potential for tropical cyclogenesis. The JMA classified the system as a tropical depression the next day, followed by the PAGASA at 02:00 PHT (18:00 UTC) on August 18, assigning the local name Huaning. Later that day, the JTWC issued a TCFA, citing a consolidating LLCC within a reverse-oriented monsoon trough. Despite initial hindrance from wind shear and dry air, Huaning gradually organized and was designated as 18W by the JTWC at 06:00 UTC. It was upgraded to a tropical storm on August 20 and named Lingling by the JMA on August 21. Satellite imagery showed improved convective banding wrapping around a compact LLCC under favorable conditions, including strong outflow, low to moderate shear, and warm 29–30 °C (84–86 °F) sea surface temperatures. Lingling made landfall near Hioki, Kagoshima at 17:00 JST (08:00 UTC) before weakening into a tropical depression, and later dissipated into a remnant low on August 23.

Although Lingling did not directly hit the Philippines, heavy rain from the storm and the southwest monsoon led to class suspensions in parts of Cavite and Cebu. In Japan, intense rainfall halted Shinkansen services in Kyushu, with up to 95 mm in Minamikyūshū and 300 mm across southern Kyushu on August 22. Landslide warnings were issued citywide, with landslides reported in Ichikikushikino and flood alerts in Minamisatsuma and Minamikyūshū. Evacuations were ordered as flooding disrupted transport, affecting travel in Fukuoka, Nagasaki, Shikoku, and parts of Honshu.

=== Typhoon Kajiki (Isang) ===
- Typhoon (JMA)
- Category 3 typhoon (SSHWS)
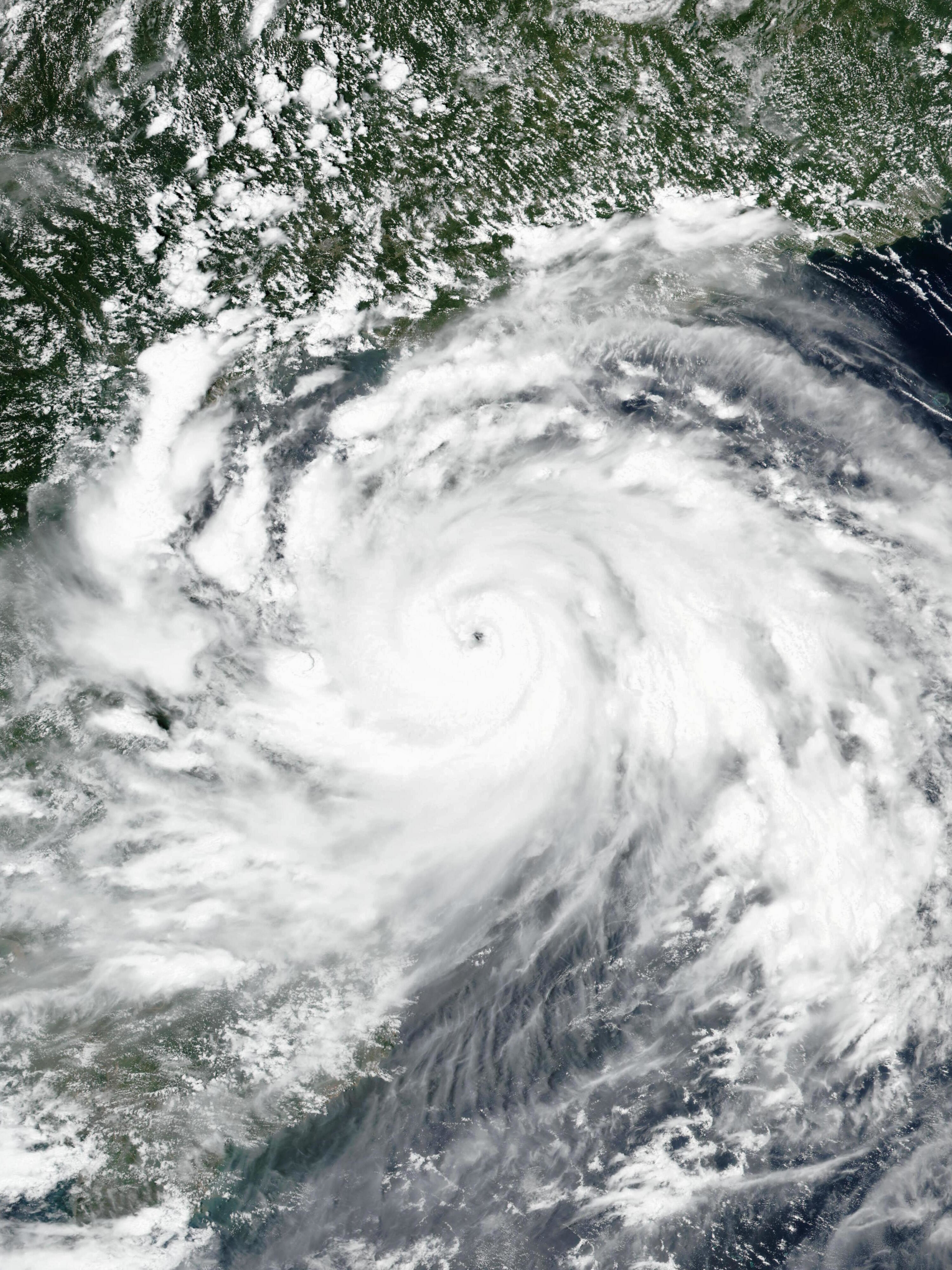
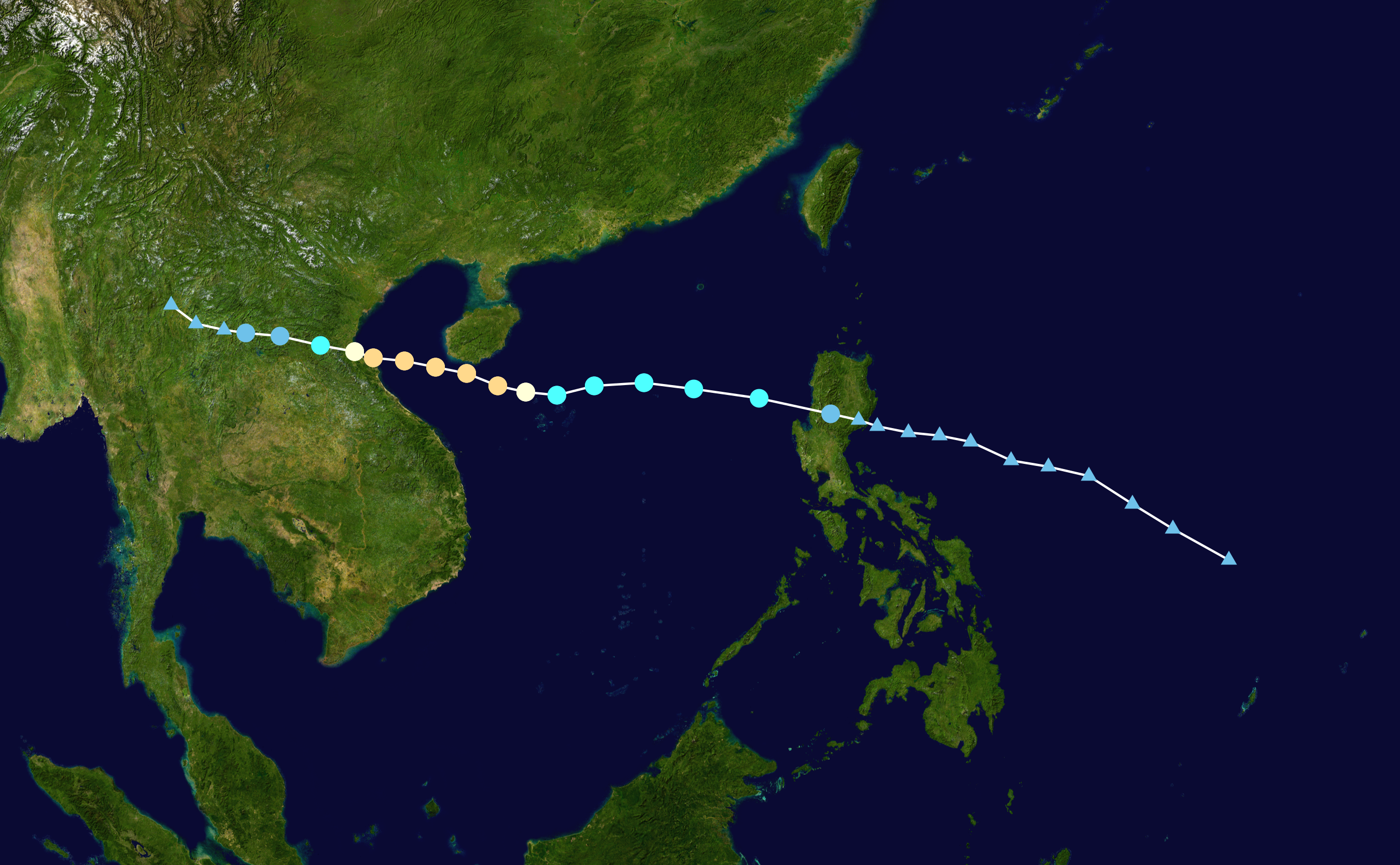
- Duration: August 21 – August 26
- Peak intensity: 150 km/h (90 mph) (10-min); 950 hPa (mbar)

On August 22, a tropical depression formed off the east coast of Luzon, named Isang by PAGASA. Isang made landfall over Casiguran, Aurora that morning, and by the next day, it strengthened into Tropical Storm Kajiki while crossing the South China Sea. Kajiki strengthened further into a typhoon and peaked in intensity while passing south of China's Hainan island. The JTWC classified it as a Category 2-equivalent typhoon with a 23-nautical-mile-wide (43 km) eye. It then weakened slightly over the Gulf of Tonkin, before making landfall on Vietnam between Nghệ An and Hà Tĩnh around 18:00 ICT (11:00 UTC) on August 25. The storm later moved inland, rapidly deteriorating until it reportedly dissipated on the following day.

The storm, along with the southwest monsoon, (Note: Tagalog: Habagat) affected more than 50,000 people and displaced over 25,000 across the Philippines, causing extensive flooding in Metro Manila. In Vietnam, Kajiki killed at least four people and injured 47. The storm damaged over 34,700 homes, 380 schools, and 44 health facilities, affecting 116,700 ha (288,000 acres) of crops. Its remnants triggered deadly floods and landslides in Northern Thailand, killing seven and injuring 24 in Mae Suek, Chiang Mai, with two missing and dozens of homes damaged. Flooding also struck Mae Chaem and Mae Hong Son, while in Myanmar, flash floods in Tatkon Township prompted evacuations, and a landslide occurred in Pinlaung Township, Shan State. Losses totaled US$188 million.

=== Tropical Storm Nongfa (Jacinto) ===
- Tropical storm (JMA)
- Tropical storm (SSHWS)
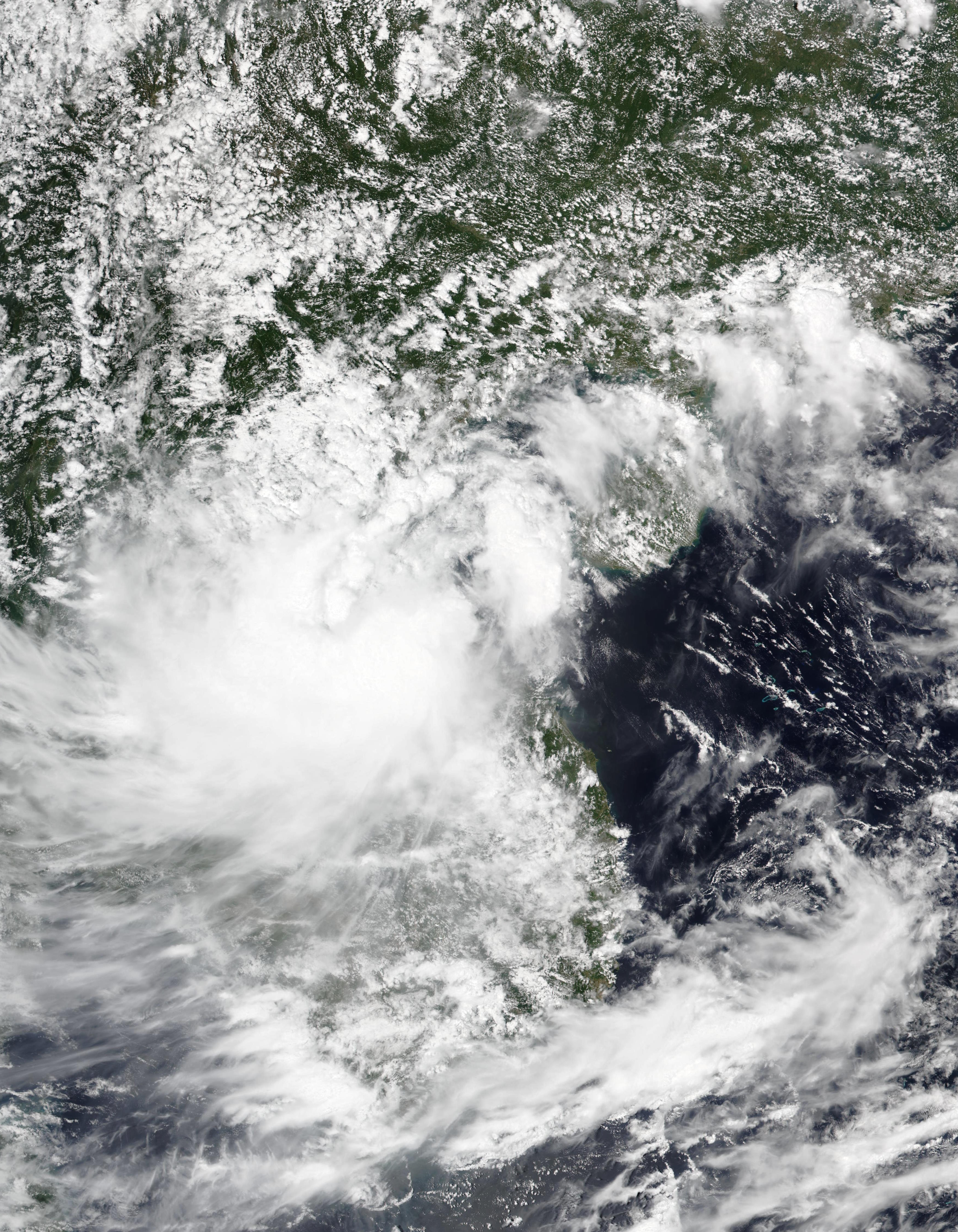
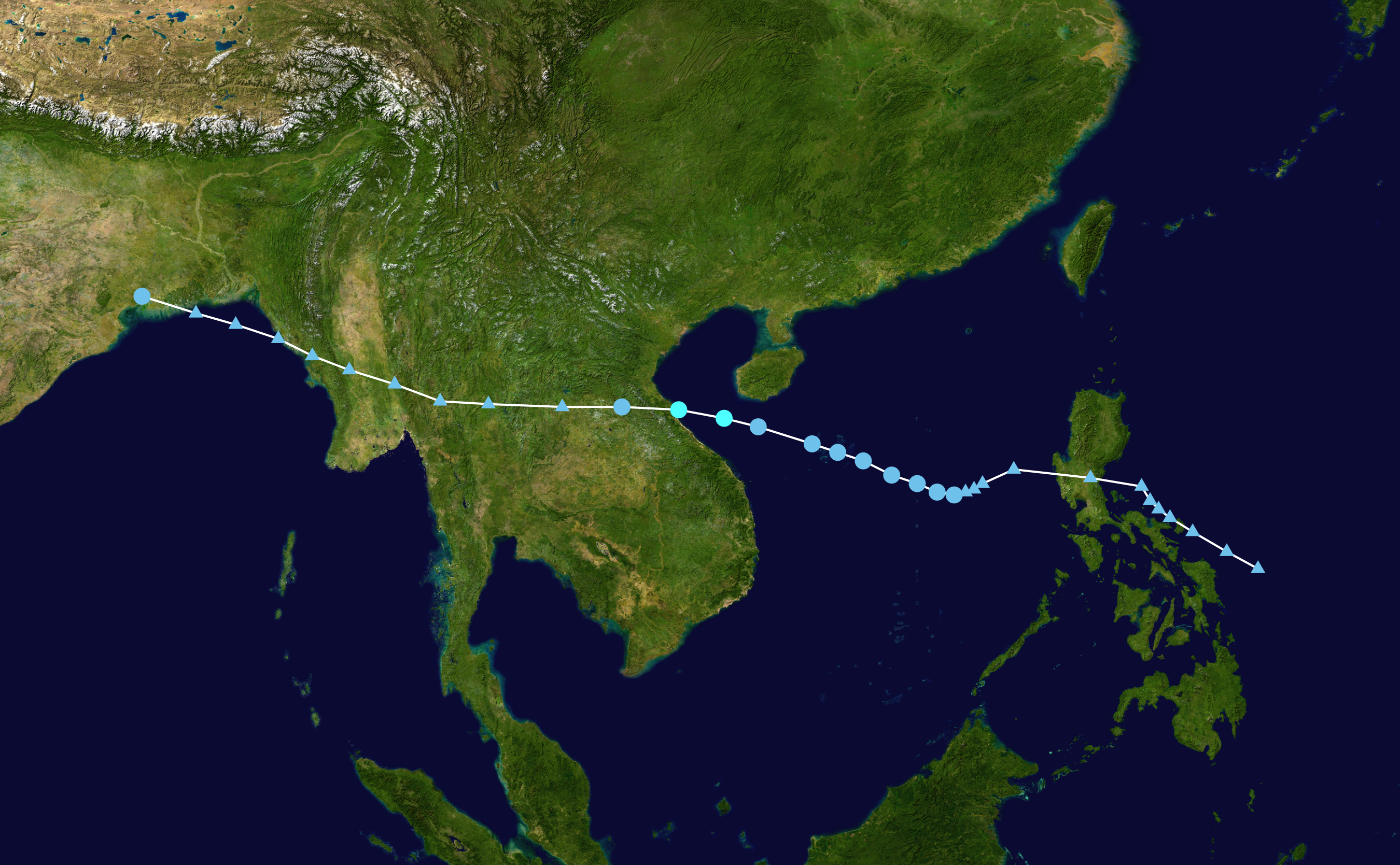
- Duration: August 27 – August 31
- Peak intensity: 75 km/h (45 mph) (10-min); 996 hPa (mbar)

On August 23, the PAGASA began monitoring a low pressure area east of Surigao del Sur, noting a high chance of development. The JMA briefly classified the system as a tropical depression on August 27 but downgraded it before reinstating the classification. PAGASA upgraded it to a tropical depression on August 28 and named it Jacinto, replacing Jolina. The JTWC later issued a TCFA and designated the system as 20W. Moving westward into the South China Sea, the system encountered marginal conditions, including upper-level northerly flow and exposed low-level circulation. On August 30, it strengthened into a tropical storm and was named Nongfa by the JMA, exhibiting improved convection and banding. Nongfa made landfall between Quảng Trị and Hà Tĩnh provinces in Vietnam on August 30, weakening as it crossed mountainous areas in Vietnam and Laos. Both the JMA and JTWC issued final advisories on August 31 as the system dissipated. Its remnants later crossed into the Bay of Bengal and eventually redeveloped into Deep Depression LAND 04 over the Arabian Sea on September 6.

In Central Vietnam, Nongfa brought heavy rains and flooding that cut off roads and isolated mountain villages in Quảng Trị and Hà Tĩnh. Over 165 residents were evacuated in Quảng Trị, and landslides, road subsidence, and infrastructure damage were reported. Meanwhile, in Thailand, Nongfa's remnants and the ongoing monsoon trough caused widespread flooding in the Pa Sak, Yom, and Nan basins. Districts in Phetchabun Province and Phitsanulok reported flash floods and crop damage. Authorities activated emergency response centers, controlled dam releases, and coordinated evacuations to mitigate further impacts.

=== Tropical Storm Peipah (Kiko) ===
- Tropical storm (JMA)
- Tropical storm (SSHWS)
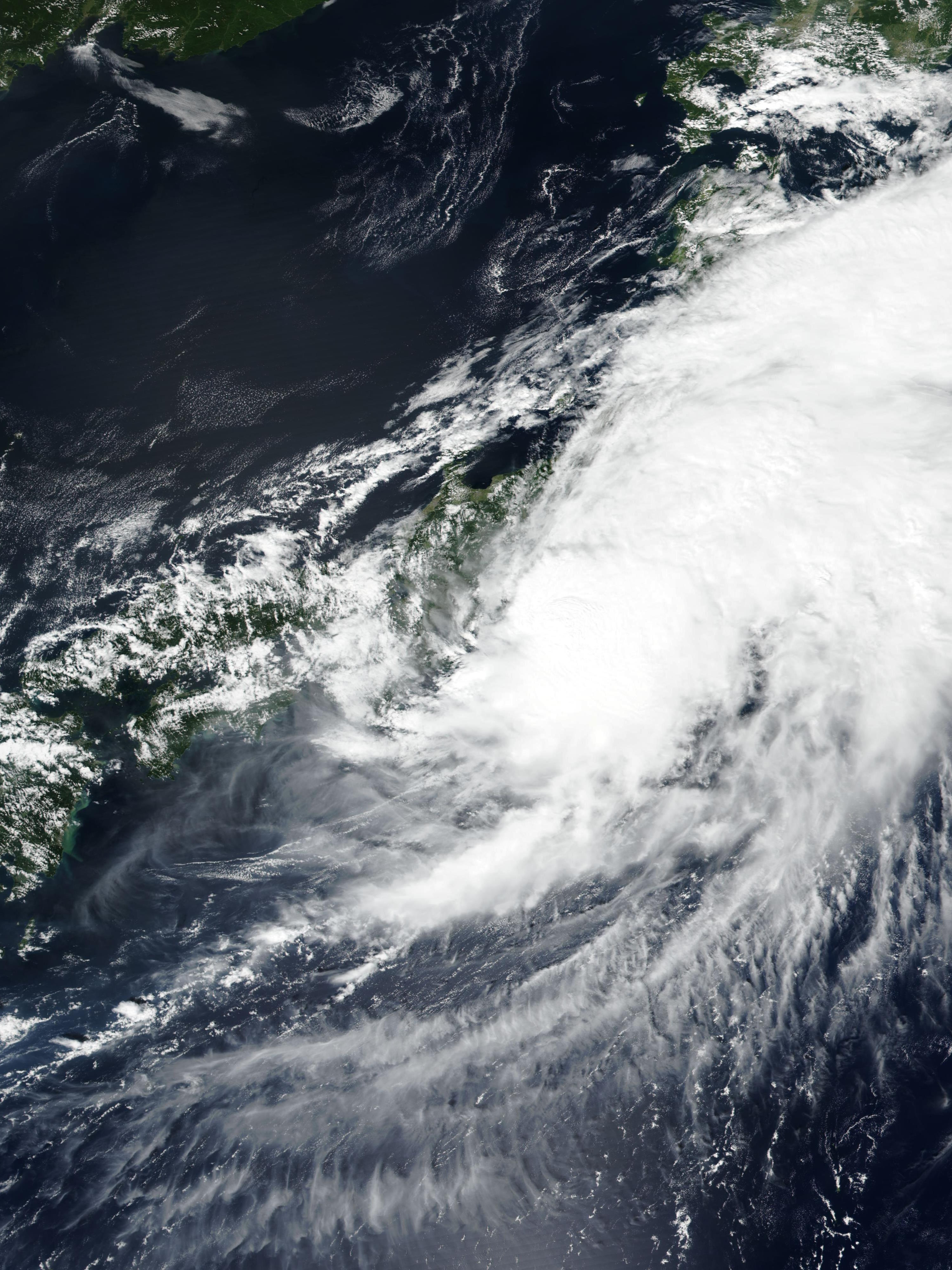
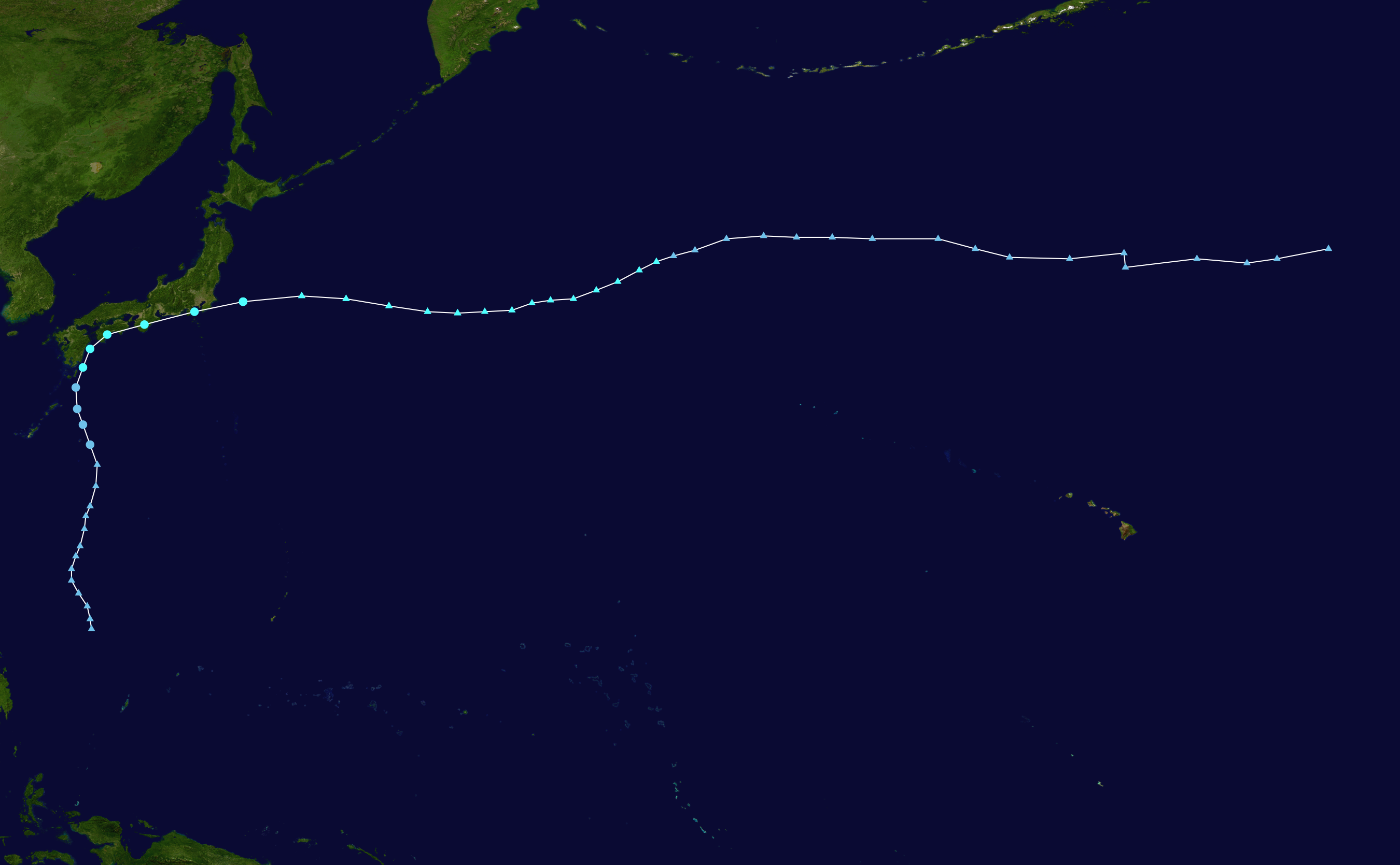
- Duration: September 2 – September 5
- Peak intensity: 85 km/h (50 mph) (10-min); 992 hPa (mbar)

At 12:00 UTC on September 2, the Japan Meteorological Agency (JMA) began monitoring a tropical depression about 430 nmi (800 km; 490 mi) southeast of Naha. The following day, PAGASA named the system Kiko, while the Joint Typhoon Warning Center (JTWC) issued a Tropical Cyclone Formation Alert. The JTWC designated it 21W later that day. On September 4, the JMA upgraded the system to a tropical storm, naming it Peipah, as it tracked north-northeast along the subtropical ridge. Peipah made landfall in Sukumo, Kōchi Prefecture at 01:00 JST on September 5, and again in northern Wakayama Prefecture later that morning. The storm began extratropical transition later that day, prompting the JTWC's final advisory at 15:00 UTC. The JMA declared Peipah extratropical at 12:00 UTC.

Although Peipah did not directly impact the Philippines, its interaction with the southwest monsoon affected over 93,000 people and displaced nearly 1,300 across four regions. In Kantō, Kōshin'etsu, and Tōkai, Peipah caused major transport disruptions, including delays and cancellations on the Tōkaidō Shinkansen and at Narita and Haneda. In Shizuoka Prefecture, strong winds damaged or destroyed dozens of houses and injured at least 24 people. In Yaizu, a greenhouse collapse seriously injured a farmer. Flooding was reported in Kamakura. A tornado and severe winds injured several people and left about 17,000 households without power. Both the Tōkaidō and San'yō Shinkansen lines were suspended. Losses totaled to US$150 million.

=== Severe Tropical Storm Tapah (Lannie) ===
- Severe tropical storm (JMA)
- Tropical storm (SSHWS)
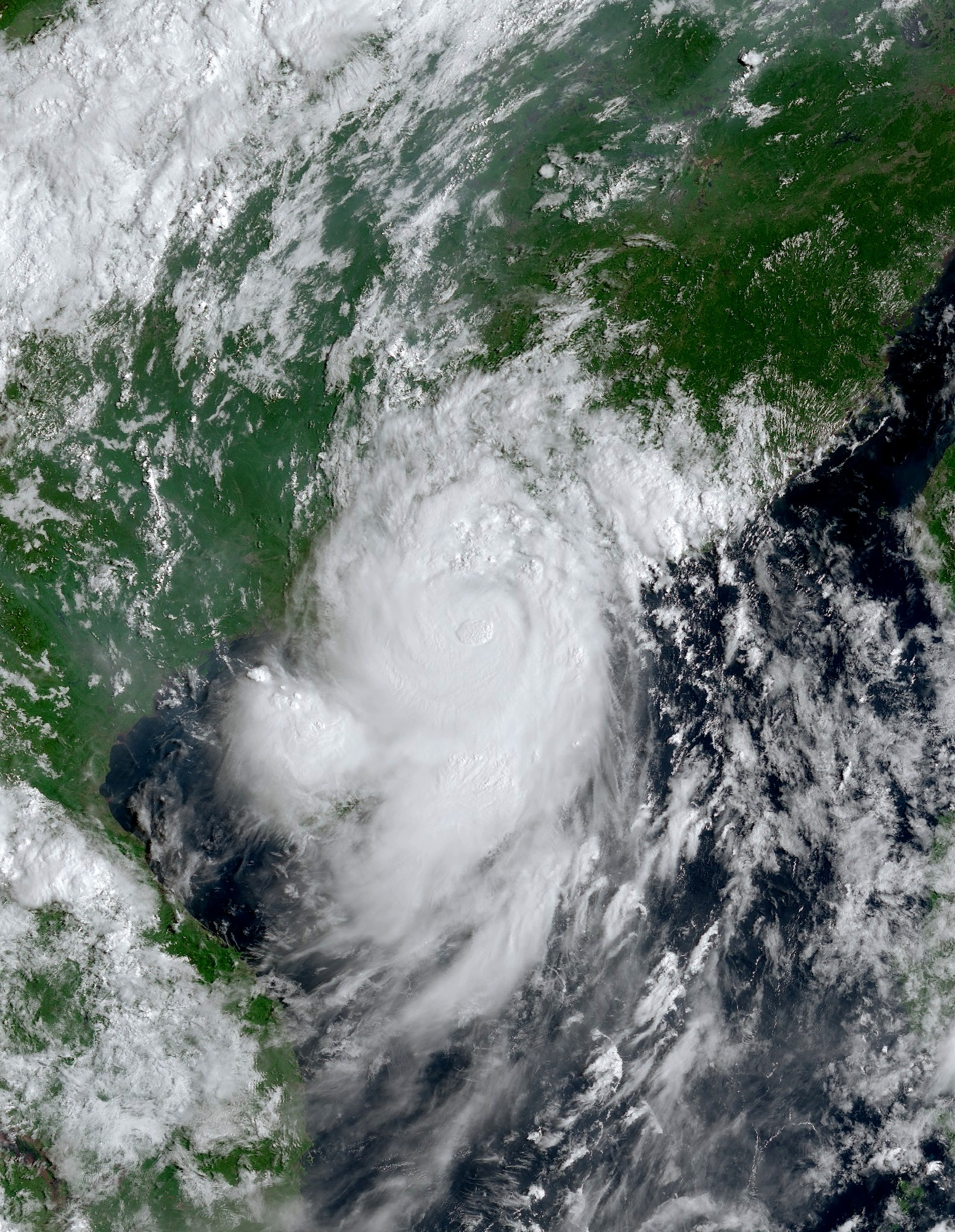
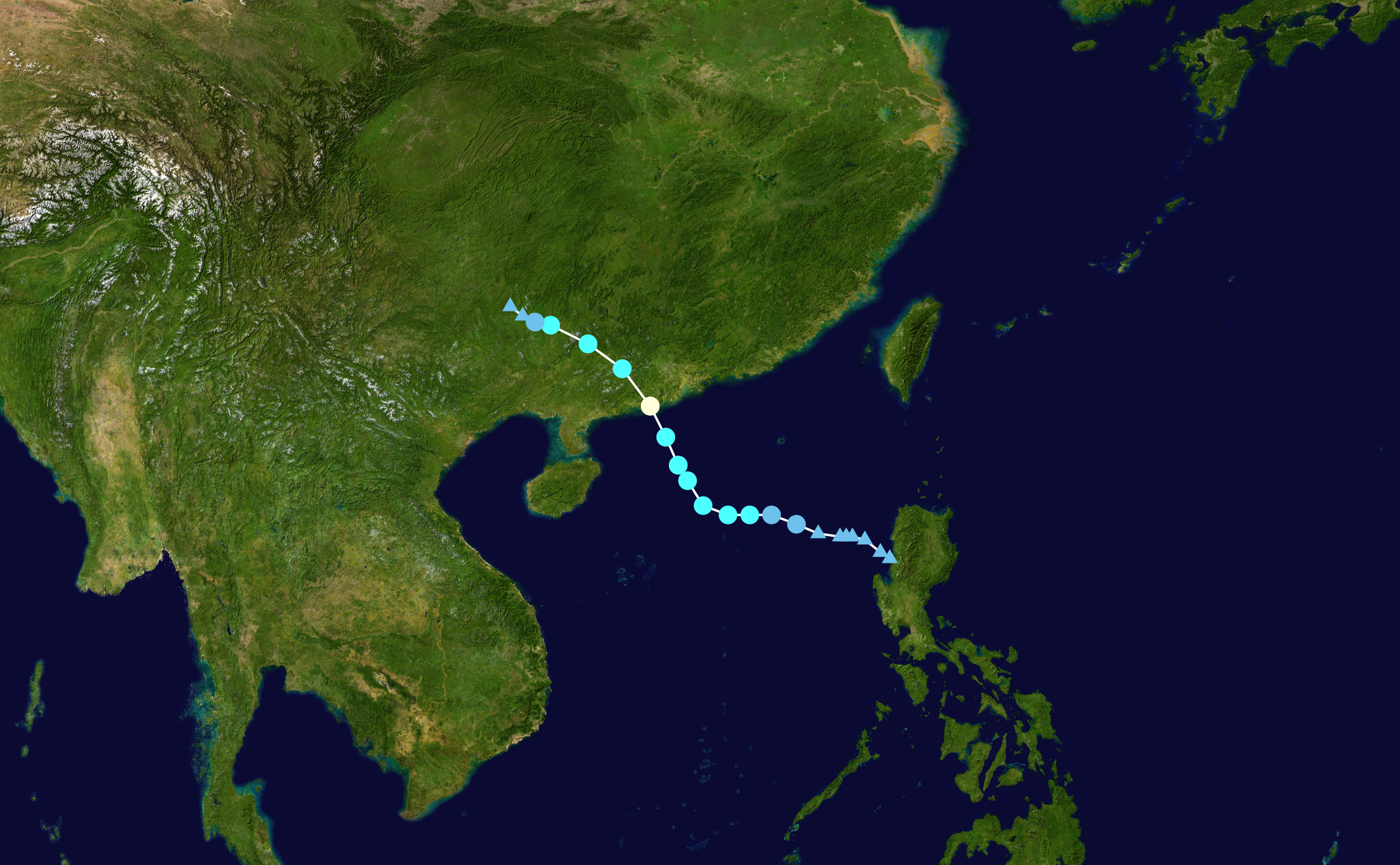
- Duration: September 5 – September 8
- Peak intensity: 110 km/h (70 mph) (10-min); 980 hPa (mbar)

On September 4, the JTWC began tracking a low-pressure area that developed west-southwest of Vigan, Ilocos Sur, citing favorable conditions for tropical cyclogenesis despite a poorly defined LLCC. On September 5, the NCHMF reported the formation of a tropical depression over the South China Sea in their first warning bulletin, issued at 21:00 ICT (14:00 UTC). At 02:00 PHT on September 6 (18:00 UTC), PAGASA upgraded the disturbance to a tropical depression, assigning it the local name Lannie. The JTWC issued a TCFA later that same day, citing a high chance of further development. Around 09:00 UTC, the JTWC subsequently upgraded the system to a tropical depression, designating it as 22W. At 21:00 JST (12:00 UTC), the JMA upgraded the system to a tropical storm, naming it Tapah, with JTWC following suit three hours later. Satellite imagery showed that Tapah had a partially exposed LLCC, with deep convection organizing over the center as it tracked northwestward on September 7. The JMA then upgraded it into a severe tropical storm early on September 8, before it made its first landfall over the Chuanshan Archipelago at 23:00 UTC. As it moved north-northwestwards, Tapah then rapidly intensified into a Category 1-equivalent typhoon before it made its final landfall over Taishan, Guangdong at 00:00 UTC. Both agencies made their last warning afterwards as the typhoon interacted with the rugged terrain over Southern China, causing it to rapidly dissipate.

Tapah caused 12 injuries in Hong Kong and generated minor flooding in Macau.

=== Severe Tropical Storm Mitag (Mirasol) ===
- Severe tropical storm (JMA)
- Tropical storm (SSHWS)
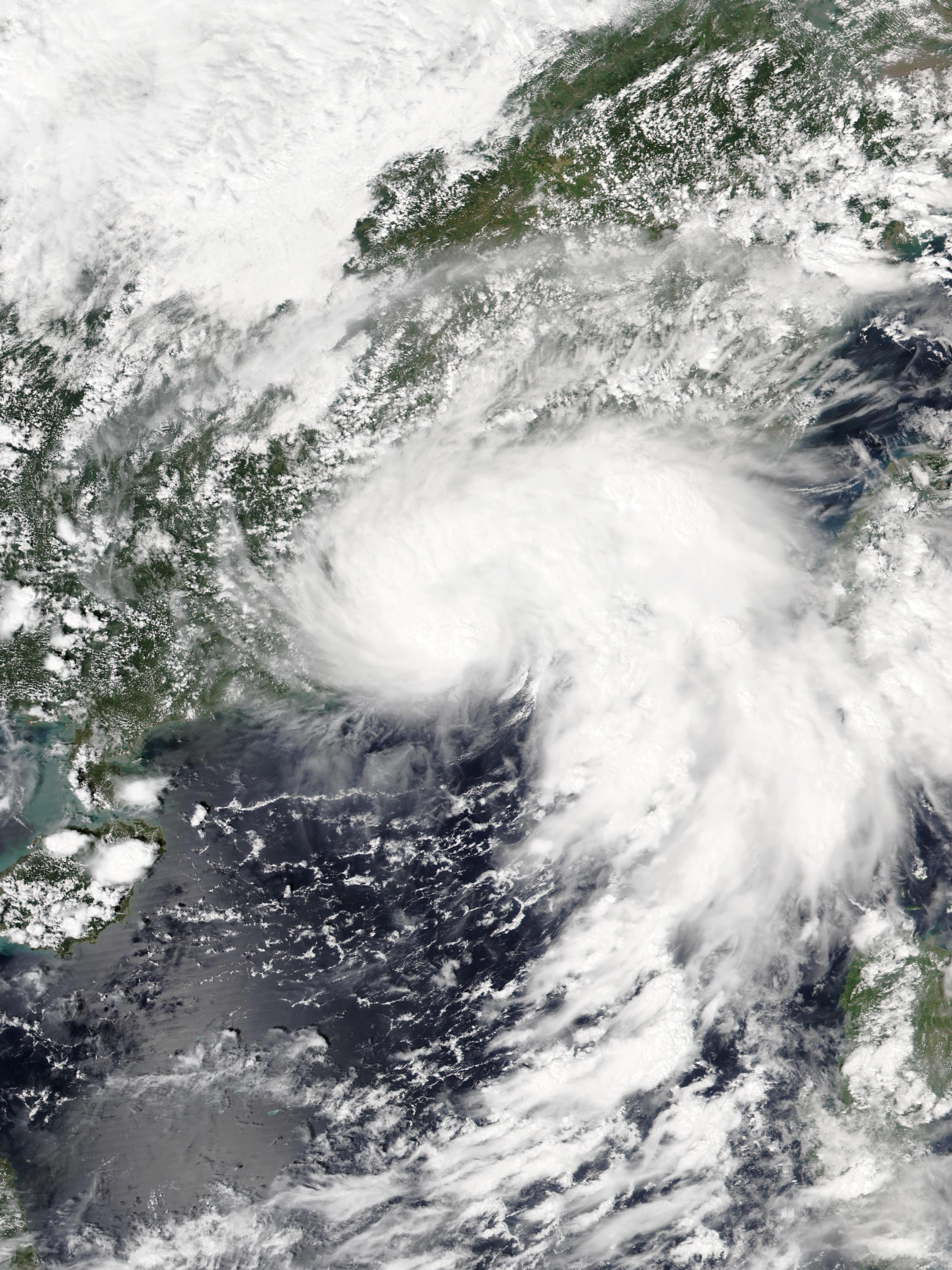
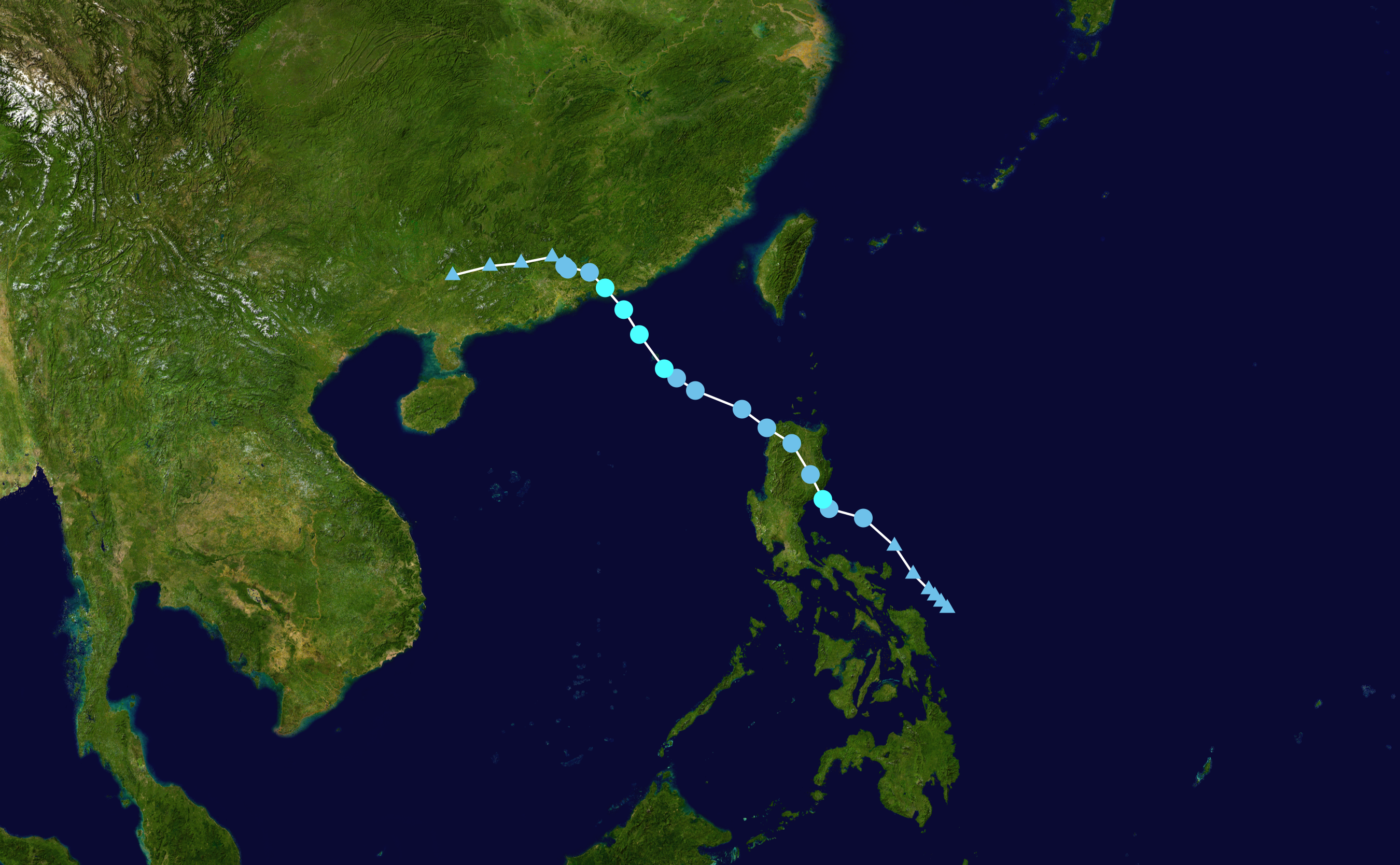
- Duration: September 15 – September 20
- Peak intensity: 95 km/h (60 mph) (10-min); 992 hPa (mbar)

On September 15, the JTWC identified a low-pressure area 90 nautical miles (167 km) that formed east-northeast of Legazpi, Albay. The next day, the JMA classified the system as a tropical depression at 15:00 JST (06:00 UTC), and PAGASA named it Mirasol, a replacement name for Maring at 14:00 PHT. The JTWC upgraded the system to 23W at 09:00 UTC. The HKO also reported its development. Mirasol made landfall over Casiguran, Aurora at 03:20 PHT on September 17. It weakened over the Cordillera Central before re-emerging into the West Philippine Sea. At 15:00 JST on September 18, the JMA named the system Mitag. Mitag intensified over the South China Sea but later encountered dry air and land interaction, prompting the JTWC to issue its final advisory. Mitag made landfall near Shanwei, Guangdong and was later downgraded to a tropical depression by the JMA. The JMA later made its final warning at 21:00 JST (12:00 UTC) of September 20 as it dissipated.

Mitag caused flooding in the Philippines, killing three people and leaving four missing in Valencia, Bukidnon.

Although JMA originally classified Mitag as a tropical storm, the agency upgraded it into a severe tropical storm according to its post-analysis on December 18.

=== Typhoon Ragasa (Nando) ===
- Violent typhoon (JMA)
- Category 5 super typhoon (SSHWS)
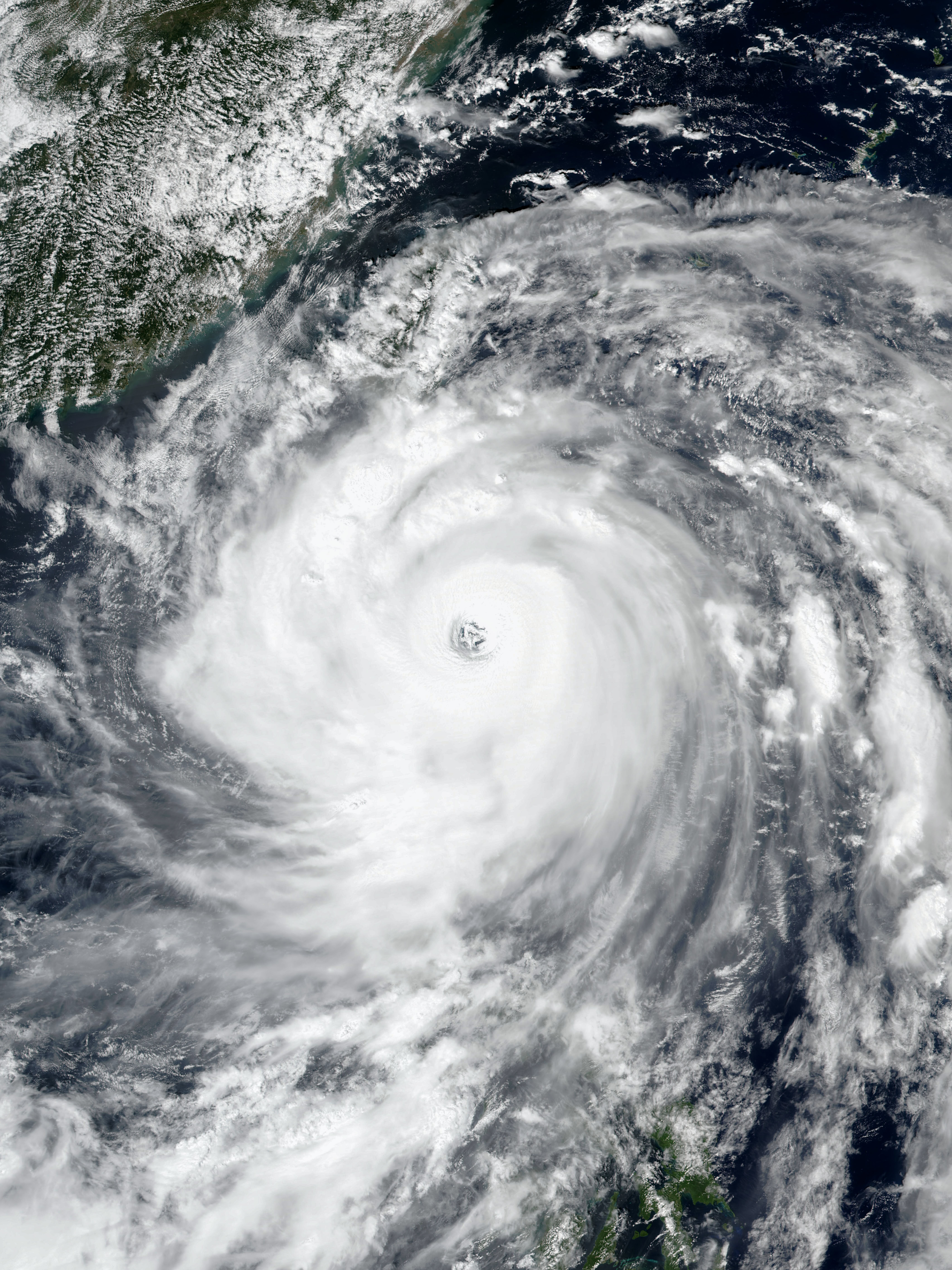
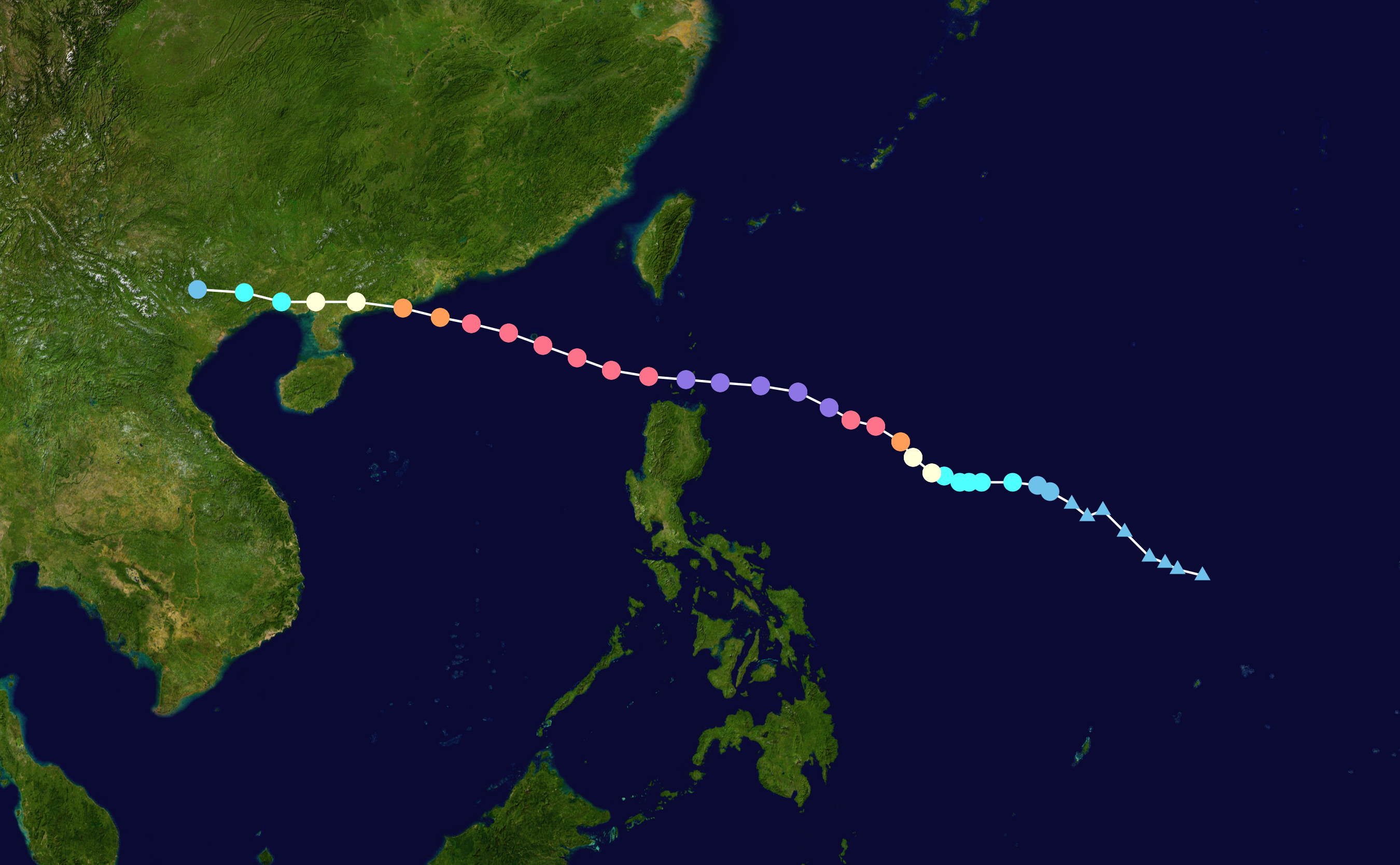
- Duration: September 16 – September 25
- Peak intensity: 205 km/h (125 mph) (10-min); 905 hPa (mbar)

On September 16, the JTWC identified a tropical disturbance north of Yap. It developed into a tropical depression the next day, according to the JMA, and was named Nando by PAGASA upon entering the Philippine Area of Responsibility (PAR). The system intensified over the Philippine Sea, becoming Tropical Storm Ragasa on September 19, and reached typhoon strength the next day. On September 21, both PAGASA and the JTWC upgraded Ragasa to a super typhoon, with the JTWC estimating 1-minute winds of 270 km/h and pressure of 910 hPa (26.87 inHg). The JMA assessed ten-minute winds of 205 km/h and pressure of 905 hPa (26.72 inHg). Ragasa made landfall over Panuitan Island in Calayan, Cagayan on September 22. After brushing the Babuyan Islands, the typhoon began to weaken gradually, underwent an eyewall replacement cycle that produced a 25-nautical-mile-wide (46 km; 29 mi) eye as it tracked west-northwestward toward the South China Sea. It made landfall at Hailing Island in Yangjiang, Guangdong on September 24, and in Beihai, Guangxi as a tropical storm the next day. It later struck Quảng Ninh province in Vietnam as a tropical depression, and dissipated soon after.

The Hong Kong Observatory issued Hurricane Signal No. 10 on September 24 for the second time this year since Wipha two months before, which has been the first time in over 60 years that the highest warning signal has been issued twice in a year. A total of at least 11 deaths and 11 injuries were caused by Ragasa in the Philippines, 18 deaths and 107 injuries in Taiwan due to flooding, and injured 101 people in Hong Kong.

=== Typhoon Neoguri ===
- Very strong typhoon (JMA)
- Category 4 super typhoon (SSHWS)
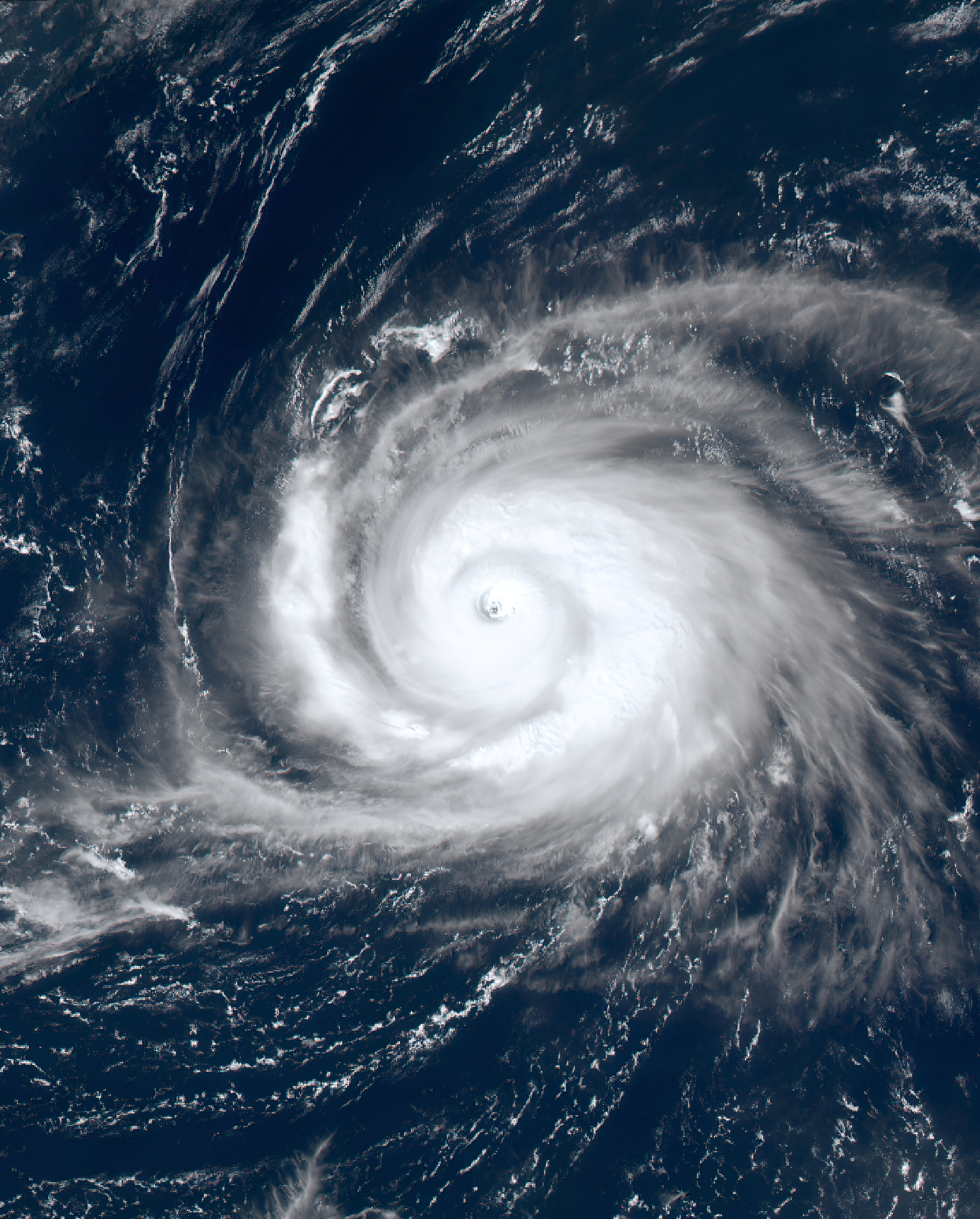
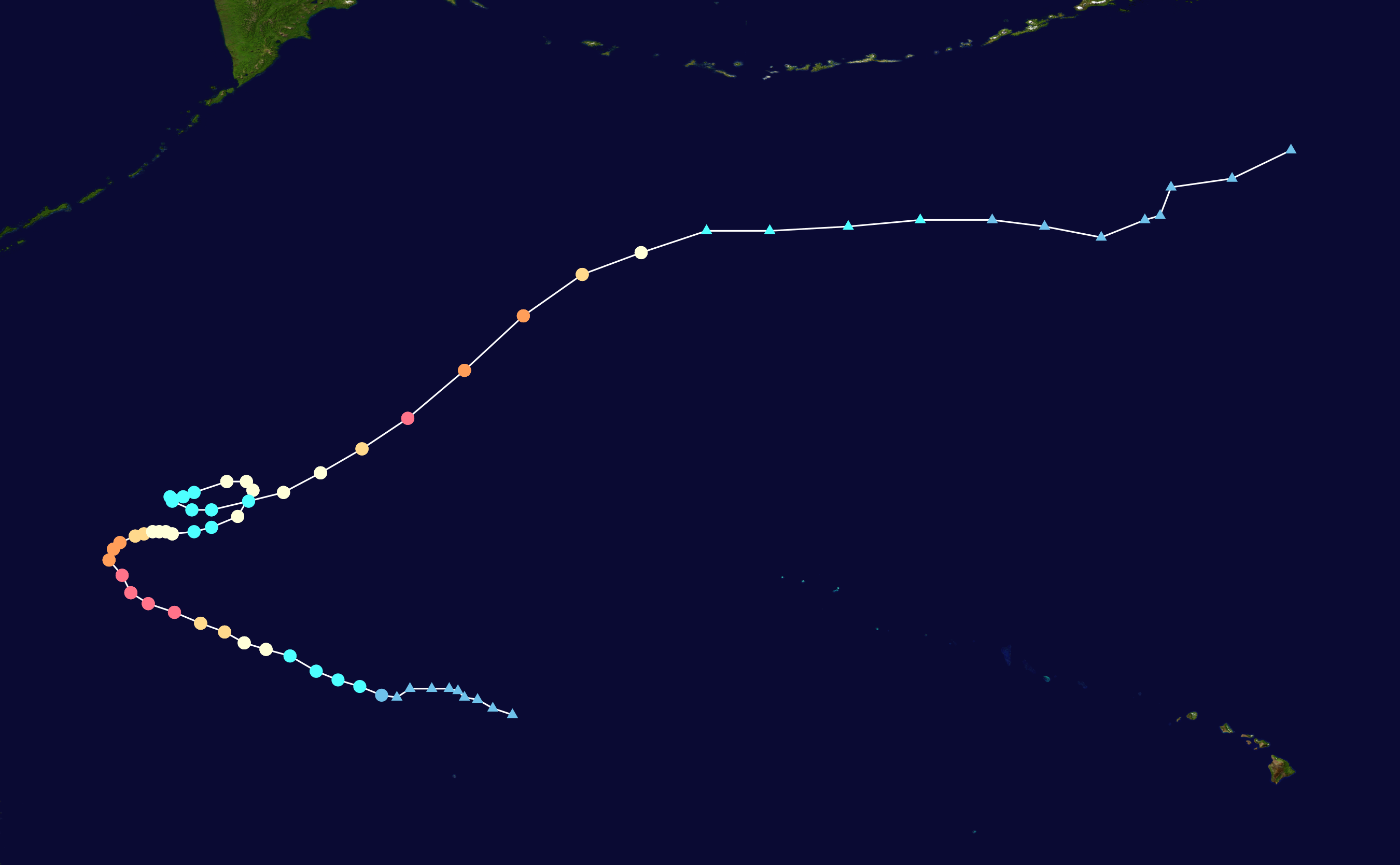
- Duration: September 17 – September 28
- Peak intensity: 185 km/h (115 mph) (10-min); 925 hPa (mbar)

On September 17, the JTWC identified an area of convection about 219 nautical miles (406 km) north of Wake Island, showing a weak low-level circulation with flaring convection. The JMA classified the system as a tropical depression later that day and named it Neoguri after upgrading it to a tropical storm at 22:20 JST (13:20 UTC). By September 19, Neoguri strengthened into a severe tropical storm under favorable conditions with 29–30 °C (84–86 °F) sea surface temperatures. Both the JMA and JTWC upgraded it to a typhoon on September 20 as a ragged eye formed and rapid intensification began. Neoguri reached "very strong" typhoon status at 18:00 JST (09:00 UTC) on September 20 and intensified rapidly, gaining 55 knots (102 km/h; 63 mph) in 24 hours. On September 21, the JMA classified Neoguri as a violent typhoon with a central pressure of 920 hPa (27.17 inHg). It peaked as a Category 4-equivalent typhoon with winds of 230 km/h (145 mph) before gradually weakening as wind shear and interaction with a mid-latitude trough increased. The JTWC downgraded Neoguri to a tropical storm on September 24, briefly reclassifying it as a typhoon later that day.

On September 27, Neoguri rapidly re-intensified into a Category 4 typhoon near 40°N, becoming one of the strongest high-latitude cyclones on record before completing its extratropical transition on September 29.Though the JMA operationally classified Neoguri as a violent typhoon, it was downgraded to a "very strong typhoon" after post-analysis was conducted on the system.

=== Typhoon Bualoi (Opong) ===
- Typhoon (JMA)
- Category 2 typhoon (SSHWS)
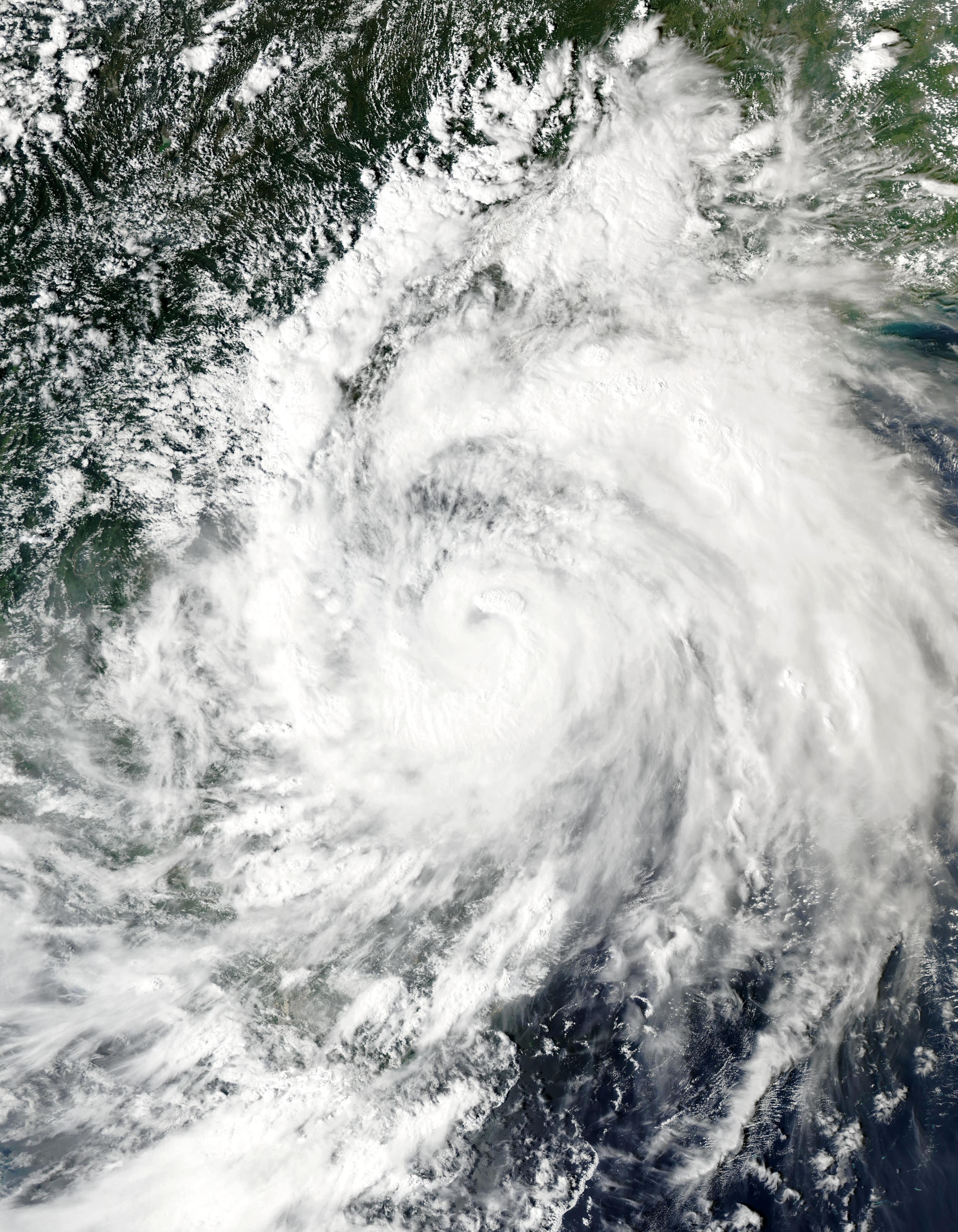
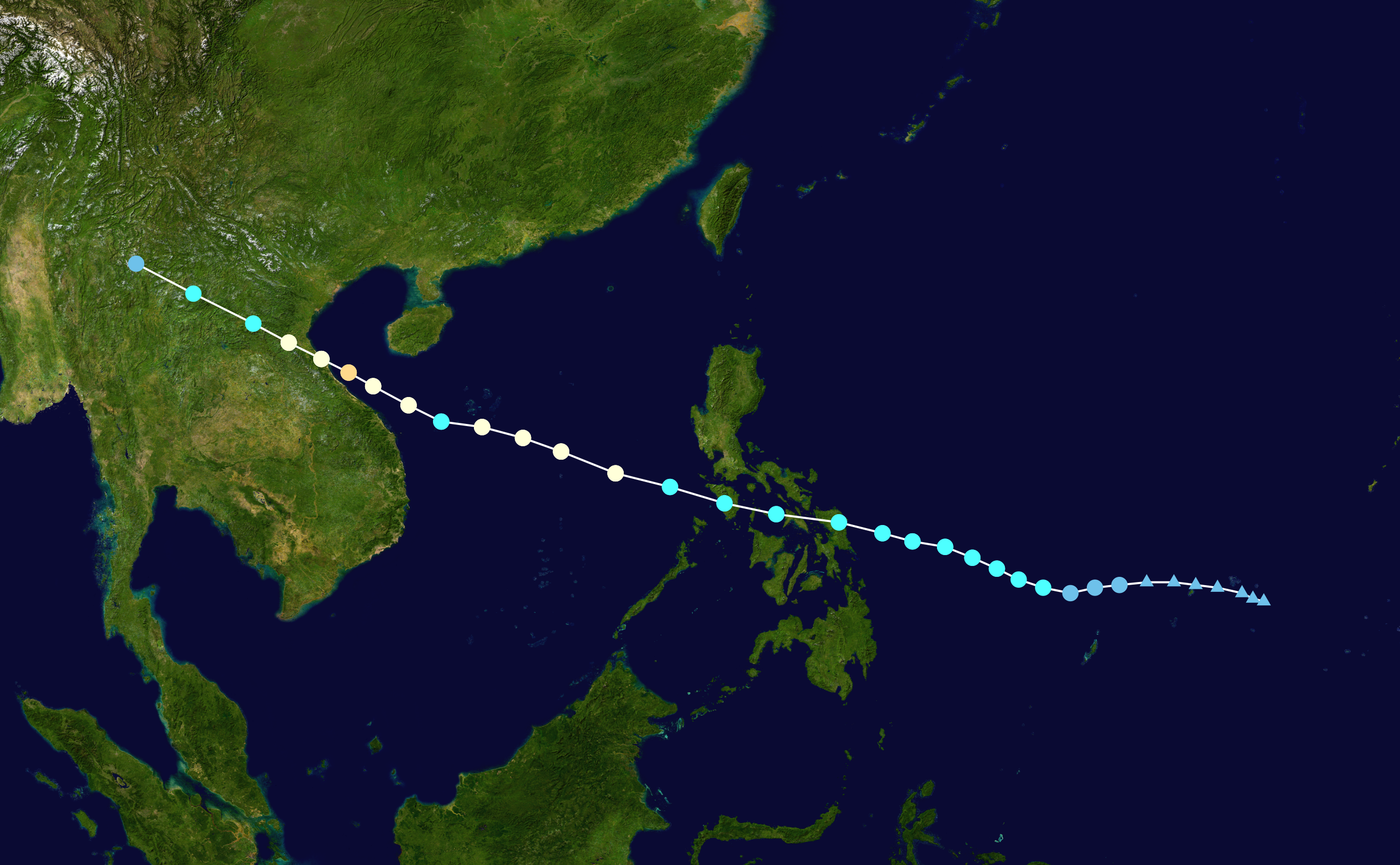
- Duration: September 22 – September 29
- Peak intensity: 120 km/h (75 mph) (10-min); 975 hPa (mbar)

On September 22, JTWC began monitoring an area of convection northeast of Yap in a marginally favorable environment. The next day, the JMA classified it as a tropical depression, and the JTWC issued a TCFA. At 16:00 PHT (08:00 UTC), the system entered the Philippine Area of Responsibility as Opong, replacing Odette By early September 24, the JTWC designated it as Tropical Depression 26W, and the JMA named it Bualoi. It was later upgraded to a tropical storm by JTWC, and then a severe tropical storm by PAGASA and JMA. On September 25 at 11:30 PHT (03:30 UTC), Bualoi made landfall as a typhoon over San Policarpo, Eastern Samar, then weakened before making five more landfalls in Palanas and Milagros, Masbate; San Fernando and Alcantara, Romblon; and Mansalay, Oriental Mindoro on September 26. After emerging into the Mindoro Strait, Bualoi reintensified into a minimal typhoon and showed signs of rapid deepening. Entering the South China Sea, the system intensified further under low wind shear and abundant moisture. Satellite and radar data showed an asymmetric structure and a ragged eye with defined rainbands reaching Vietnam. Bualoi reached its peak intensity as a Category 2-equivalent typhoon before making landfall in Hà Tĩnh, Vietnam on September 29. The JTWC issued its final advisory as the storm moved inland over Laos.

Bualoi caused damage in parts of the Philippines and left 37 people dead and another 13 missing. More than 400,000 people were displaced. In Vietnam, at least 51 people died, 153 were injured and 14 others went missing, while around 300,000 people were evacuated. As of November 25, damages were valued at nearly 23.898 trillion dong (US$950 million).

=== Typhoon Matmo (Paolo) ===
- Typhoon (JMA)
- Category 2 typhoon (SSHWS)
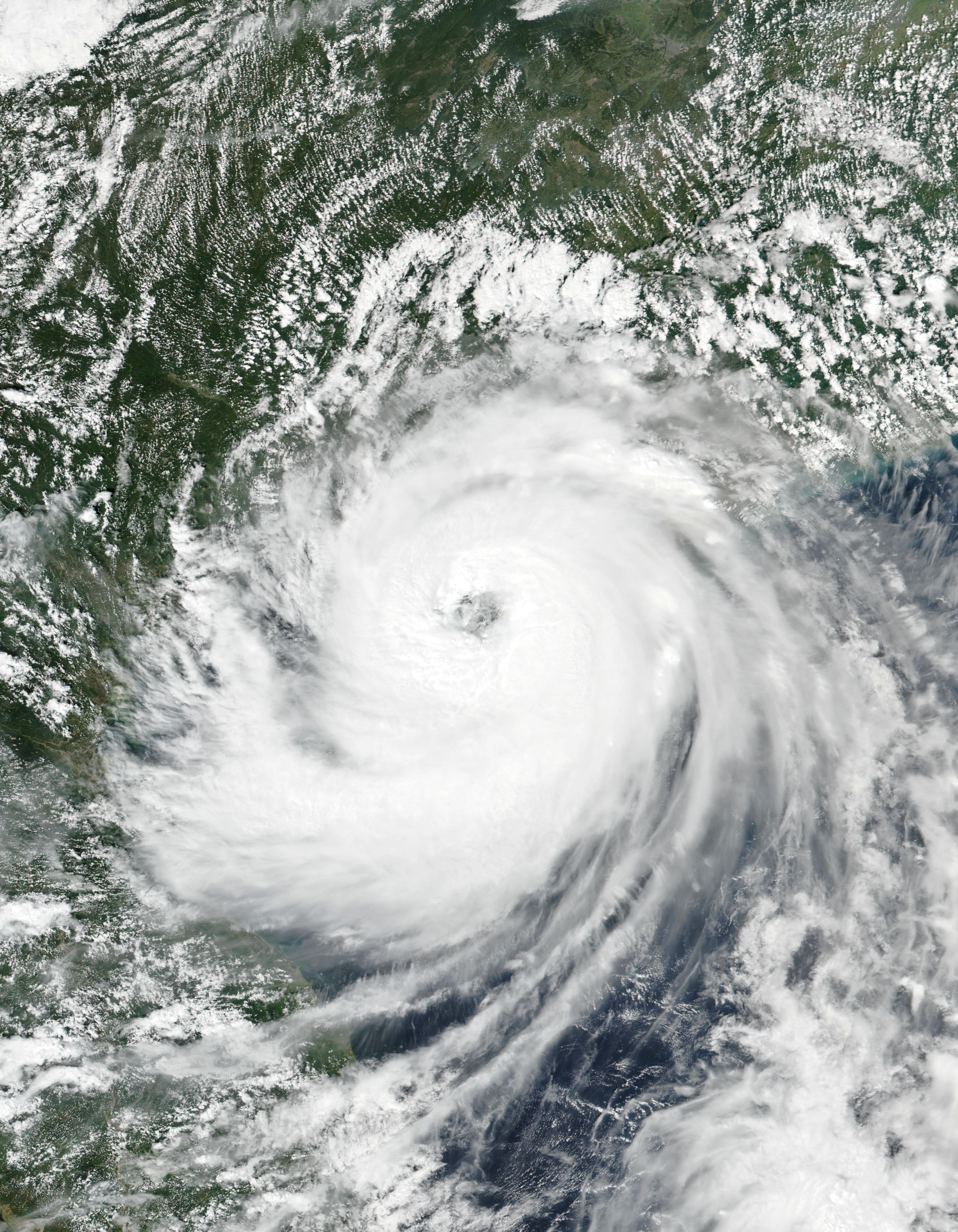
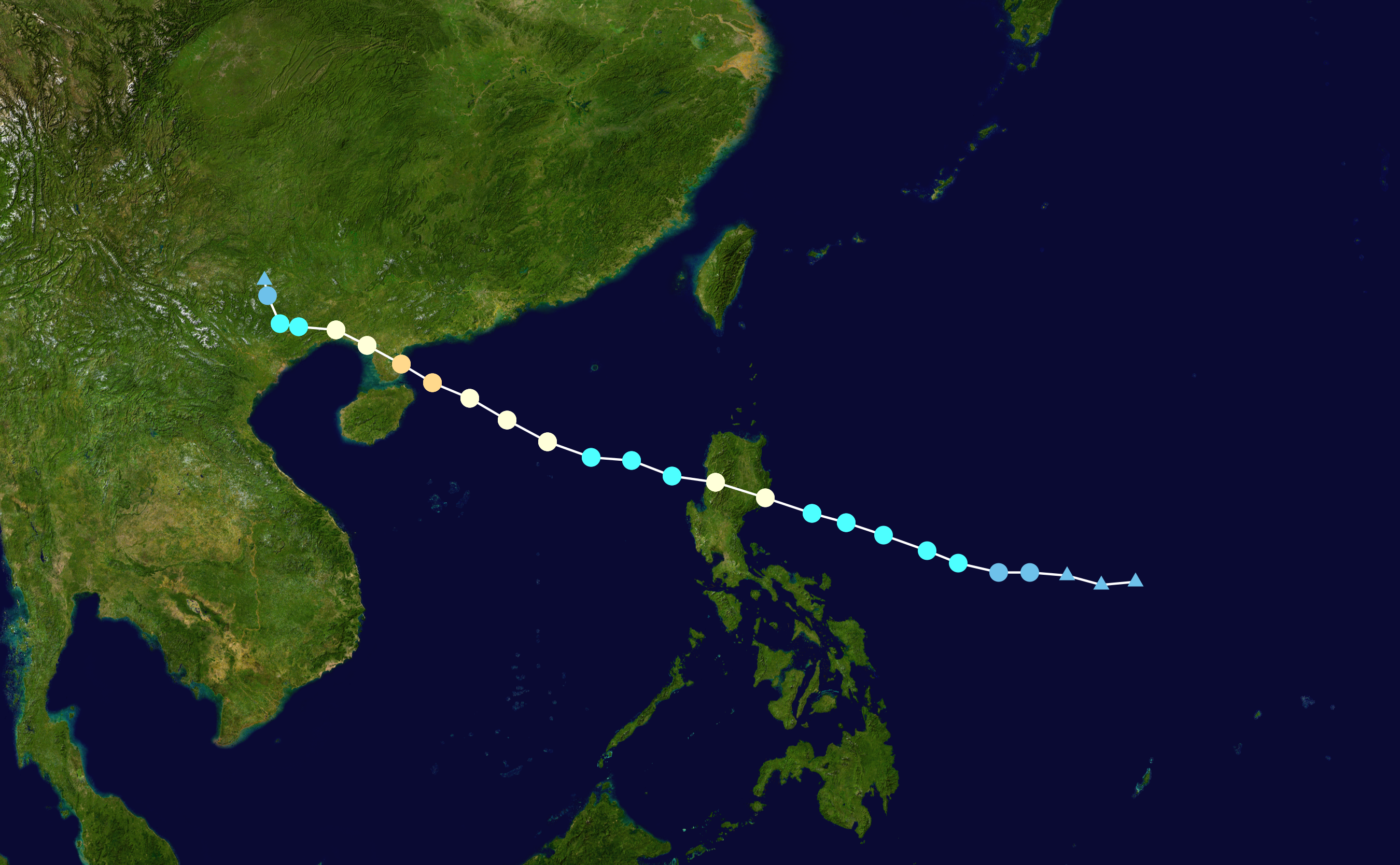
- Duration: September 30 – October 6
- Peak intensity: 130 km/h (80 mph) (10-min); 975 hPa (mbar)

On October 1, a tropical depression formed east of the Philippines, was named Paolo by PAGASA and designated as Tropical Depression 27W by the JTWC. On the next day, the JMA upgraded it to Tropical Storm Matmo. By 23:00 PHT (15:00 UTC), PAGASA classified Matmo as a severe tropical storm amid improved convective organization. On October 3, Matmo made landfall in Dinapigue, Isabela as a typhoon, then weakened while crossing Luzon before restrengthening over the West Philippine Sea. Two days later, Matmo reached its peak intensity of a Category 2-equivalent typhoon, with estimated one-minute sustained winds of 165 km/h (89 kn) and a minimum central pressure of 968 hPa (28.6 inHg). It moved ashore southern China over Guangdong and Guangxi provinces, dissipating on October 6.

Heavy rainfall from Matmo on October 3 caused flooding across parts of Luzon and left one person dead. In Aurora, over 21,000 people were evacuated. Flash floods in Batangas prompted the evacuation of hundreds of families, while 55 families in Ifugao were relocated following the opening of Magat Dam's gates. At least eight people were killed by the storm in Vietnam, along with 22 people in Thailand. Meanwhile, total estimated damages in China reached ¥21.92 billion (US$3.08 billion).

=== Typhoon Halong ===
- Very strong typhoon (JMA)
- Category 4 typhoon (SSHWS)
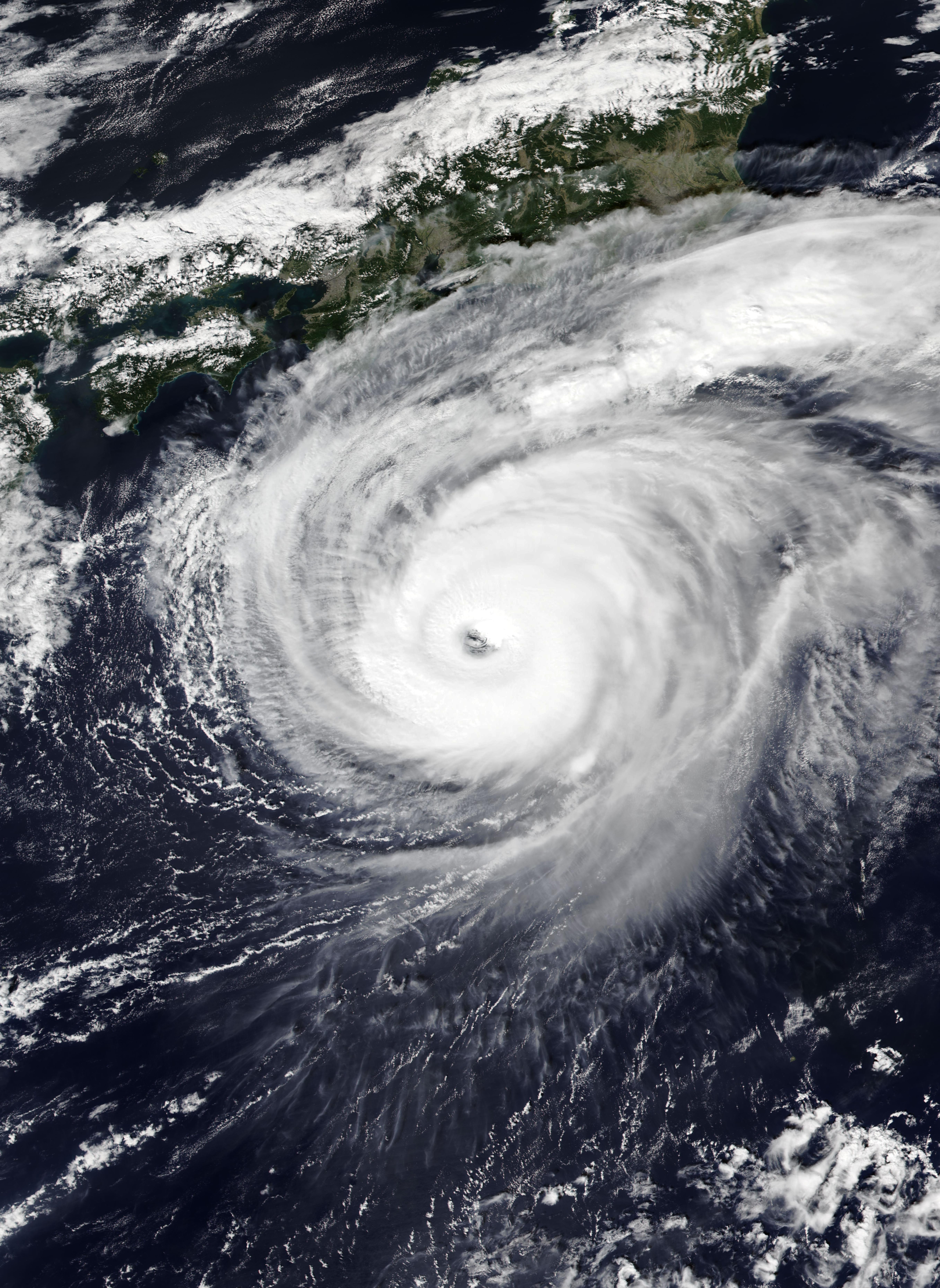
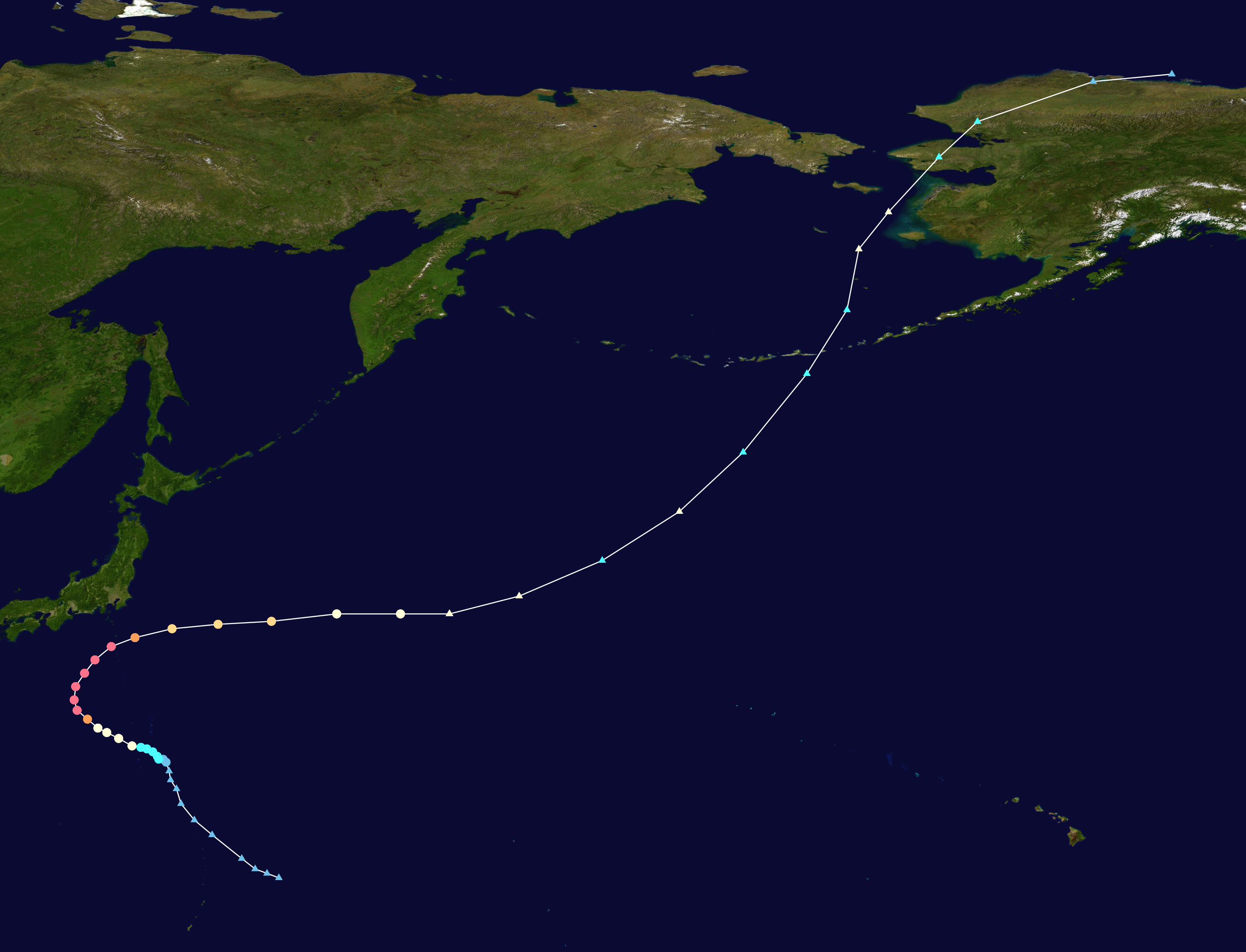
- Duration: October 3 – October 10
- Peak intensity: 185 km/h (115 mph) (10-min); 935 hPa (mbar)

A tropical depression formed southeast of Iwo Jima on October 4. Moving northwest, it steadily intensified, becoming Tropical Storm Halong on October 5, and a typhoon two days later. That day, it rapidly intensified to the equivalent of a Category 4 on the Saffir-Simpson scale as it developed a clear eye. Halong tracked northeastward on October 8, and began weakening the next day due to wind shear and dry air. JTWC issued its final advisory on October 10 as Halong transitioned into an extratropical system. JMA continued monitoring it until declaring it extratropical at 22:10 JST (13:10 UTC).

Halong generated strong waves that left one person dead in Japan. In Hachijojima, wind speeds were measured at 107 knots (123 mph) and record rainfall amounts of 349 millimetres (13.7 in) were observed. Over 2,700 customers lost water on the island and another 2,200 customers lost power. Several roads were left impassible on these islands due to flooding and downed trees. In Western Alaska, flood and high wind watches were issued as the extratropical remnants of Halong approached, bringing hurricane-force winds to the Bering Sea. The storm caused widespread damage in the Yukon-Kuskokwim Delta, where winds reached 107 miles per hour (172 km/h) in the Kusilvak Mountains. Record flooding hit Kipnuk and Kwigillingok, where homes were swept away and several residents went missing. One fatality was confirmed in Kwigillingok, with two others missing. The storm caused an estimated US$125 million in damages to Alaska.

=== Typhoon Nakri (Quedan) ===
- Typhoon (JMA)
- Category 2 typhoon (SSHWS)
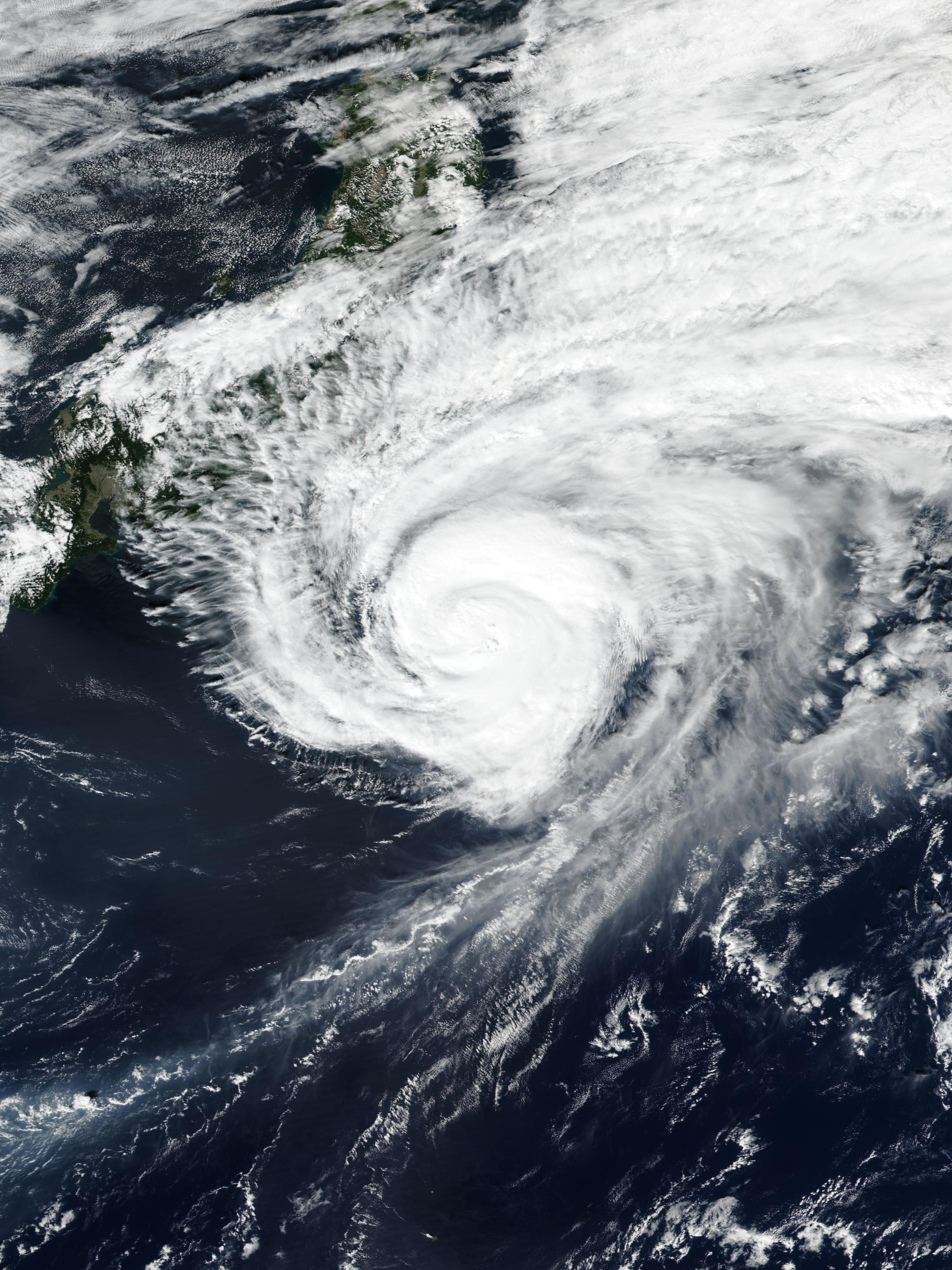
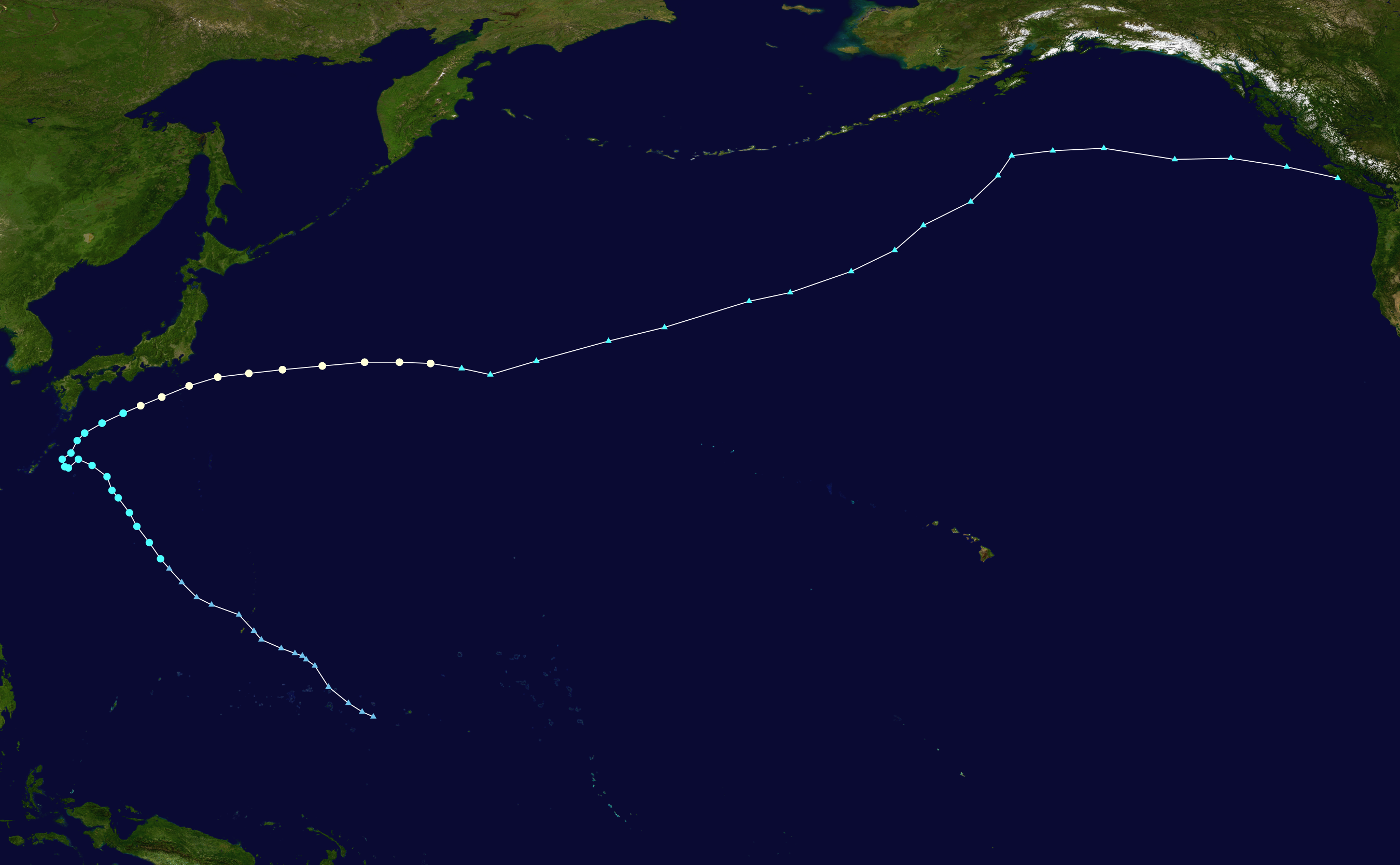
- Duration: October 6 – October 14
- Peak intensity: 130 km/h (80 mph) (10-min); 970 hPa (mbar)

On October 6, the JTWC identified a disorganized low-pressure area about 205 nautical miles (380 km) southeast of Guam, with persistent convection along its southern periphery. Environmental conditions were marginal, featuring moderate wind shear (15–20 kts), moderate southerly outflow, and warm sea surface temperatures (29–30 °C). Later that day, the JMA classified the system as a tropical depression near 13°N 147°E.The JTWC issued a TCFA at 03:00 UTC on October 7, indicating a high chance of development. Both the JMA and JTWC upgraded the system to a tropical storm on October 8, naming it Nakri and 29W respectively as it strengthened in favorable conditions. At 12:40 PHT (04:40 UTC) on October 9, it entered the PAR and was named Quedan by PAGASA. Despite warm waters, vertical wind shear and dry air limited intensification as Nakri stalled near the Ryukyu Islands. Around 03:00 JST (18:00 UTC) on October 12, the JMA upgraded Nakri to a severe tropical storm as it drifted north-northeastward. The storm later intensified into a Category 1 typhoon according to the JTWC near south of Camp Fuji, Shizuoka Prefecture, with the JMA following early on October 13. Weakening soon followed due to unfavorable conditions. On October 15, the JTWC ceased advisories as Nakri entered extratropical transition while moving through a baroclinic zone.

As Nakri passed near Hachijō-jima, sustained winds reached 153.7 kilometres per hour (95.5 mph), while rainfall exceeded 130 millimetres (5.1 in) in 12 hours.

=== Severe Tropical Storm Fengshen (Ramil) ===
- Severe tropical storm (JMA)
- Tropical storm (SSHWS)
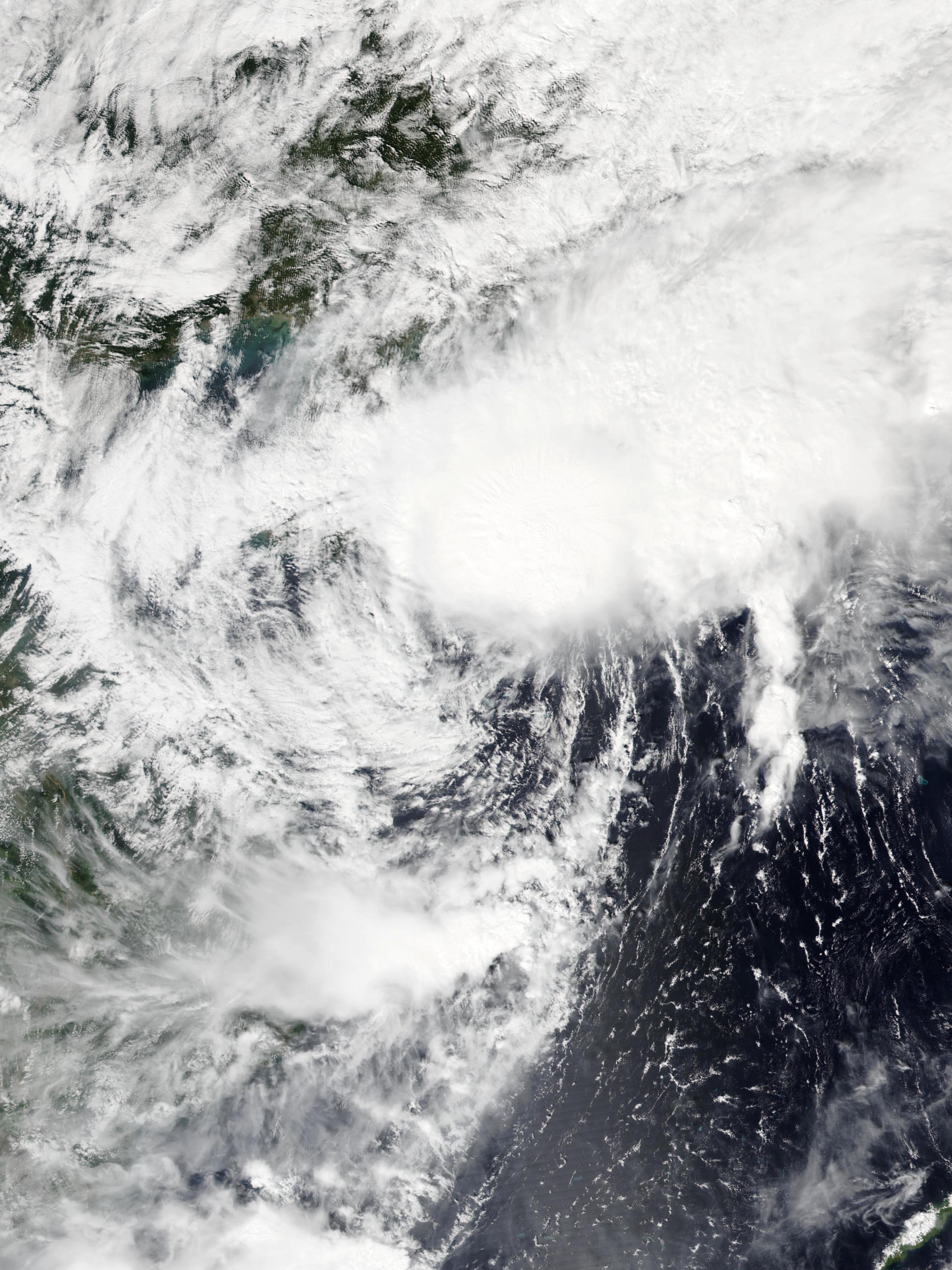
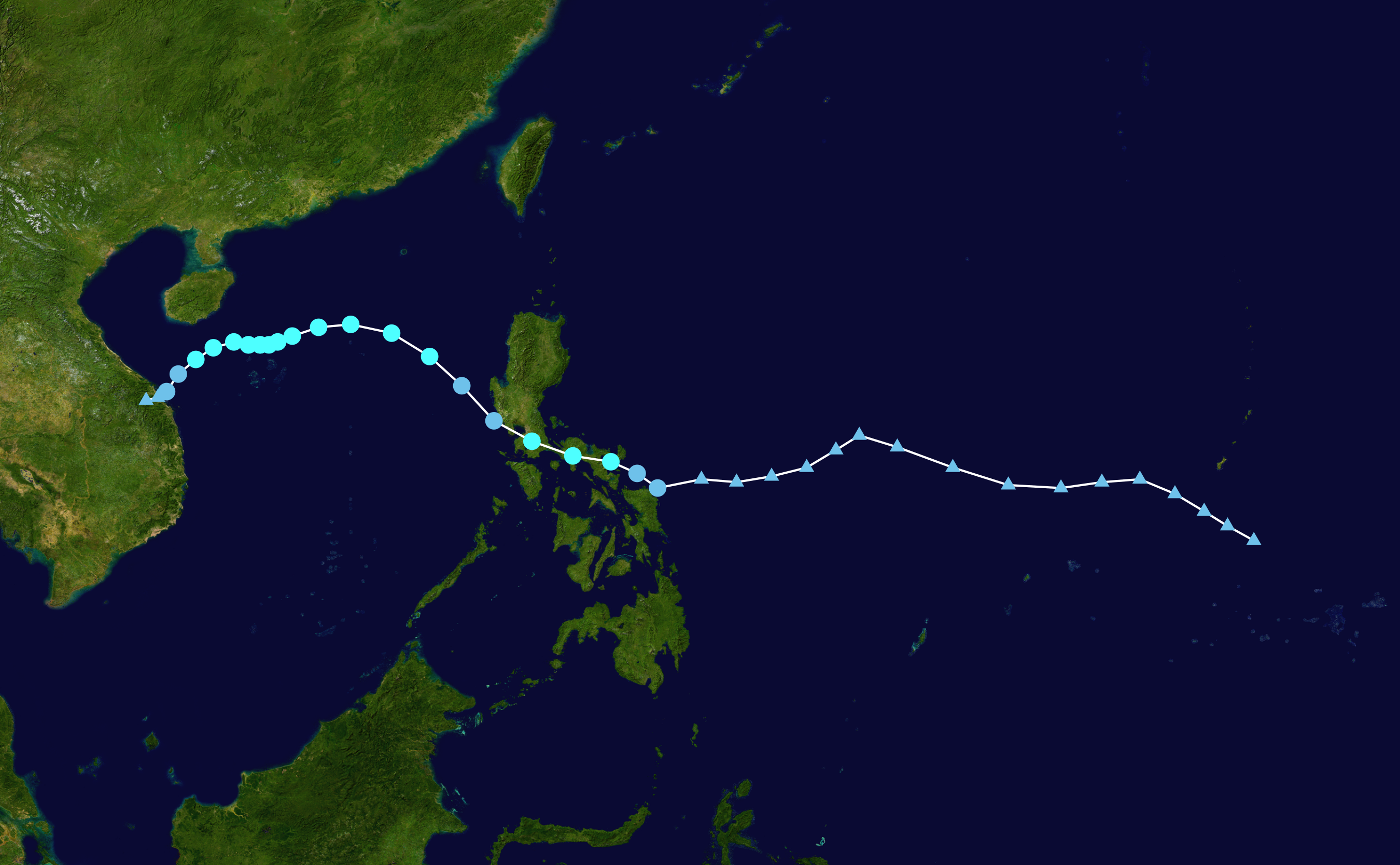
- Duration: October 15 – October 23
- Peak intensity: 95 km/h (60 mph) (10-min); 990 hPa (mbar)

A tropical depression formed on October 12 to the south of Guam, although the JMA downgraded it to a low pressure area three days later; but it was reissued again on the following day. Once the system entered the PAR, PAGASA assigned the local name as Ramil on October 16. JTWC later issued advisories on Ramil on October 18 and gave the identifier as Tropical Depression 30W. On October 18, the JMA upgraded the depression to Tropical Storm Fengshen as the storm started moving through the Philippines. Fengshen slightly weakened as it neared Northern Samar, making landfall over Gubat, Sorsogon at around 16:00 PHT (08:00 UTC). It later passed through Manila Bay before emerging over the South China Sea on October 19. The storm briefly weakened into a tropical depression before restrengthening the next day. Fengshen peaked as a severe tropical storm before weakening due to dry air and southwesterly wind shear. It eventually dissipated off the coast of Vietnam on October 23.

Fengshen generated strong winds, landslides and flooding across the Philippines that killed seven people and left two others missing. Five people were killed by a tree that fell on a house in Pitogo, Quezon, while one person was killed while three others were injured in flash floods in Roxas City, which was subsequently placed under a state of calamity. One person was injured after being pinned down in a collapsed house in Estancia, Iloilo, while two people went missing after a vehicle was hit by a landslide in Bukidnon.

=== Typhoon Kalmaegi (Tino) ===
- Very strong typhoon (JMA)
- Category 4 typhoon (SSHWS)
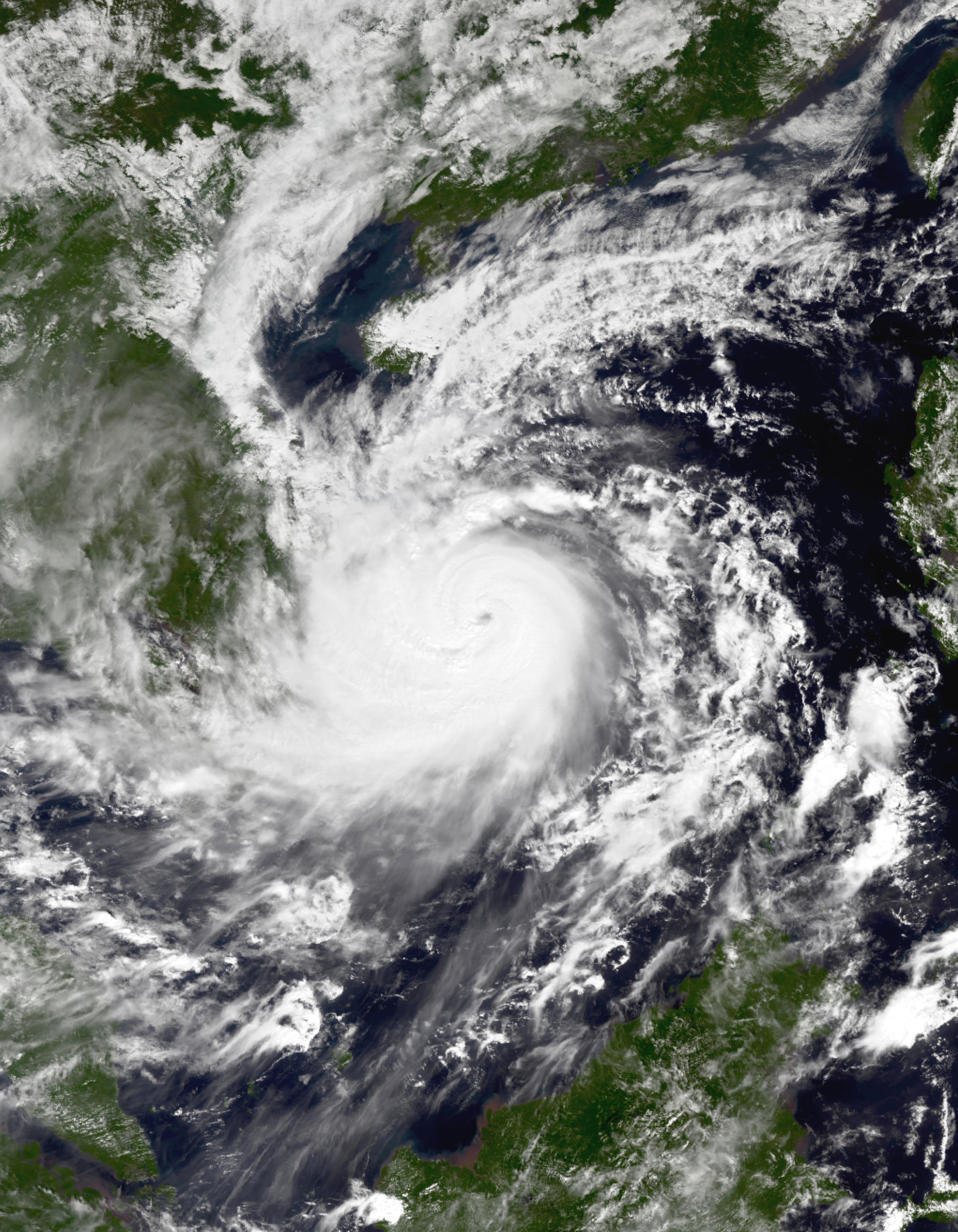
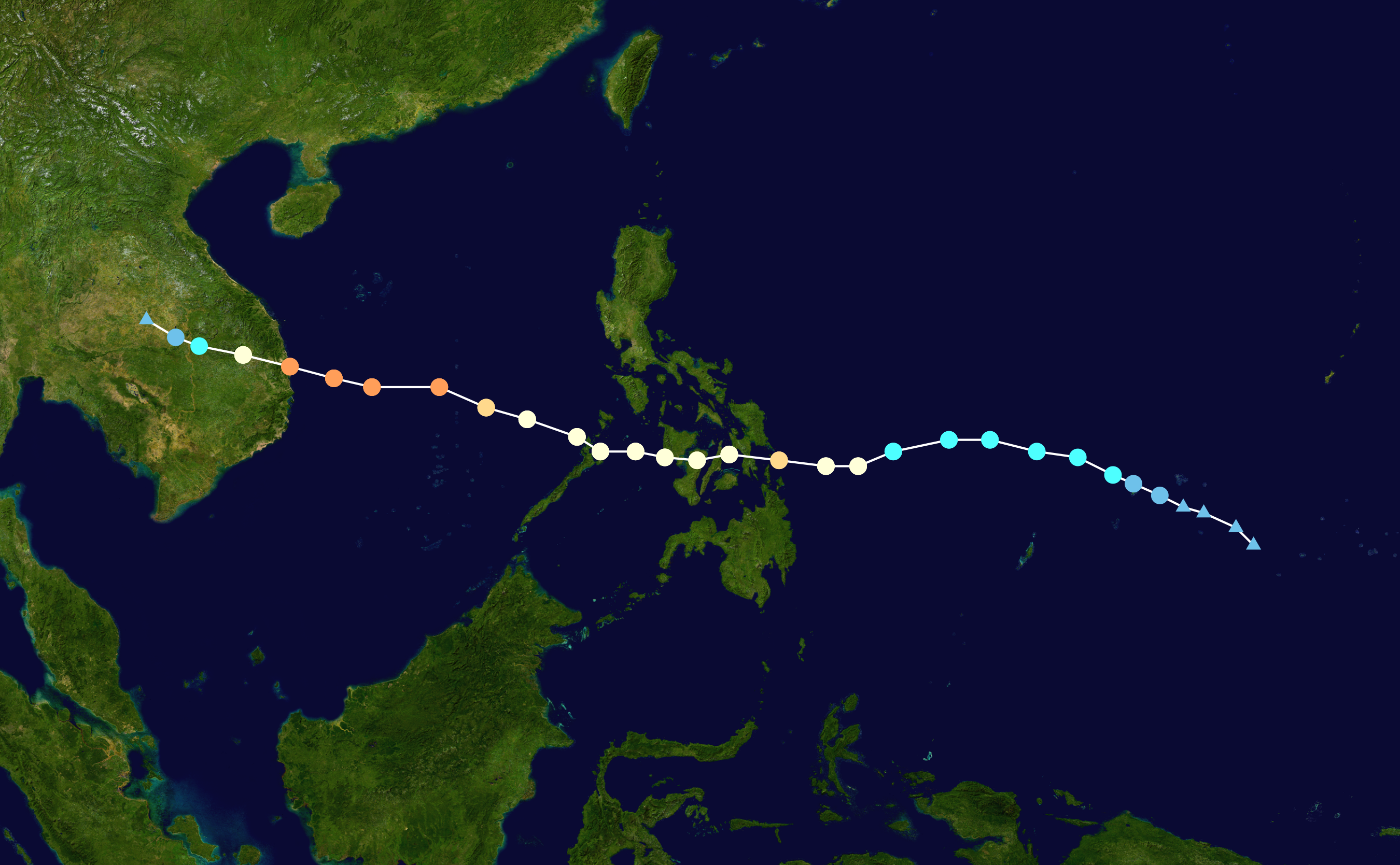
- Duration: October 31 – November 7
- Peak intensity: 165 km/h (105 mph) (10-min); 950 hPa (mbar)

A tropical depression formed on October 31 to the east of the Philippines and was designated as Tropical Depression 31W by the JTWC. The JMA upgraded it to Tropical Storm Kalmaegi a day later, and PAGASA named it Tino. Kalmaegi intensified into a typhoon on November 3, and a day later it made its first landfall in the Philippines near Silago, Southern Leyte, followed by multiple landfalls in the Visayas and Palawan. After crossing the Philippines, Kalmaegi entered the South China Sea on November 5, intensifying into a Category 3 typhoon early the next day before weakening under increasing wind shear. It made landfall over Gia Lai and Đắk Lắk, Vietnam, on November 6, and quickly dissipated inland. The JTWC issued its final advisory on November 7.

Kalmaegi brought strong winds and floods that left at least 269 dead, 523 injured and 113 missing in the Philippines, mostly in Cebu. A Philippine Air Force helicopter crashed while on a disaster reconnaissance mission in Loreto, Agusan del Sur, killing six people. The scale of the disaster led President Bongbong Marcos to declare a nationwide state of calamity on November 6. At least ₱3.26 billion (US$66.2 million) in agricultural and infrastructure damage was recorded, per the reports of the NDRRMC and the Department of Agriculture. In Vietnam, the storm left at least five dead, six injured, and three missing. Kalmaegi also caused flooding that killed 13 people in Thailand.

=== Typhoon Fung-wong (Uwan) ===
- Very strong typhoon (JMA)
- Category 4 typhoon (SSHWS)
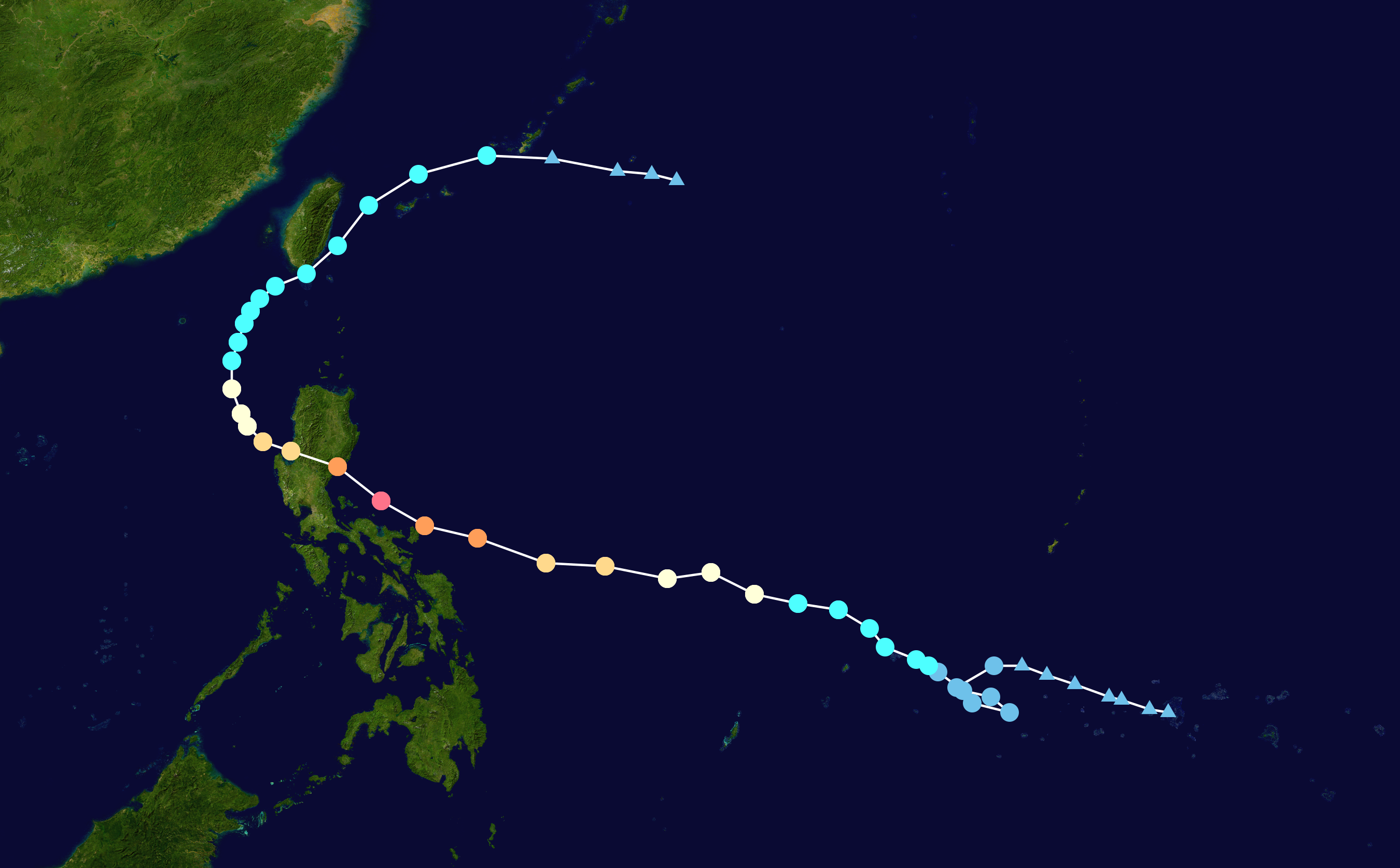
- Duration: November 4 – November 13
- Peak intensity: 175 km/h (110 mph) (10-min); 935 hPa (mbar)

On November 3, the JMA marked a tropical depression that formed around 8.1°N 147.8°E, which the JTWC meanwhile classified as Tropical Depression 32W. Moving to the west-northwest, it intensified into Tropical Storm Fung-wong on November 6. A day later, PAGASA named the system Uwan, the replacement name for Urduja. By early November 8, Fung-wong had intensified into a typhoon. PAGASA later reported that Fung-wong rapidly intensified into a super typhoon, with winds of 185 km/h (115 mph) and a diameter of 1,800 km (1,100 mi). The JTWC estimated peak winds of 215 km/h (130 mph) and a pressure of 943 hPa. At 21:10 PHT (13:10 UTC) on November 9, Fung-wong made landfall in Dinalungan, Aurora. Moving into the South China Sea, Fung-wong turned northwest while continuing to weaken. At 19:40 TST (11:40 UTC) on November 12, Fung-wong made landfall over Hengchun Township in Pingtung County, Taiwan as a tropical storm, and shortly after weakened into a tropical depression. The system dissipated on November 13.

Fung-wong generated flooding and landslide that left 33 people dead, 52 injured and two others missing in the Philippines. Total damages from the NDRRMC was recorded at ₱4.92 billion (US$99.89 million). The storm also left one death and 95 injured, leaving NT$139.53 million (US$4.45 million) worth of damage in Taiwan.

=== Typhoon Koto (Verbena) ===
- Typhoon (JMA)
- Category 2 typhoon (SSHWS)
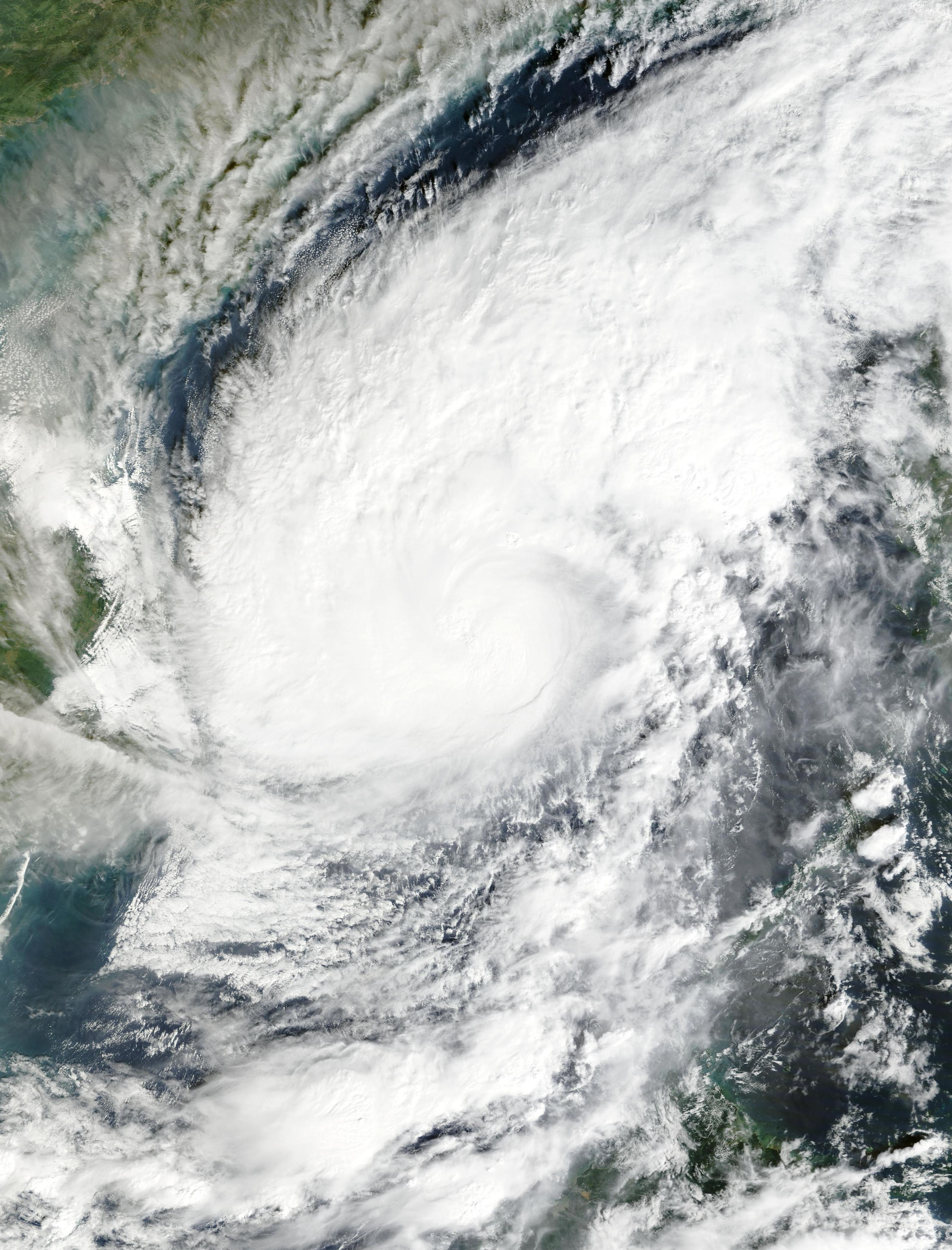
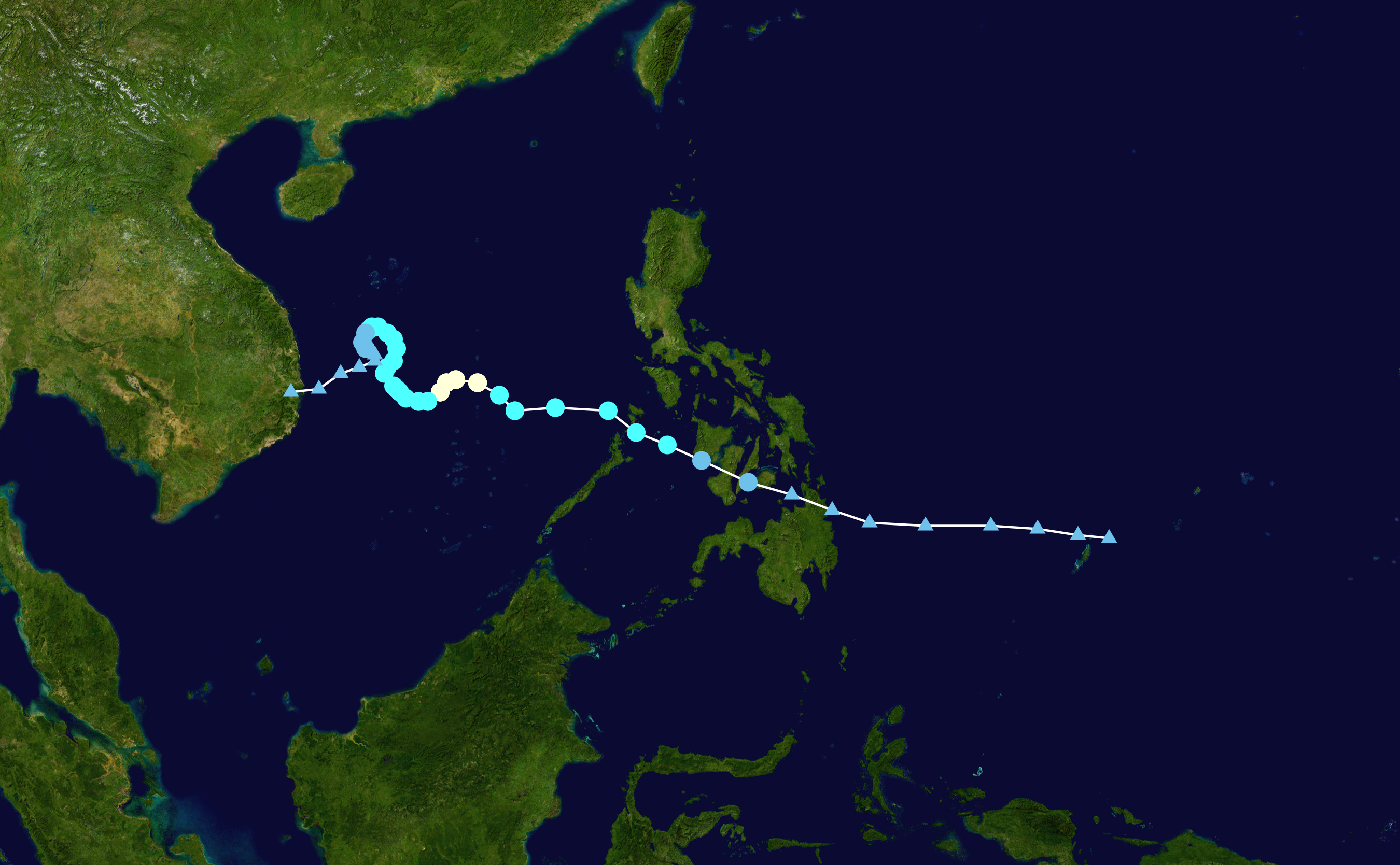
- Duration: November 23 – December 3
- Peak intensity: 130 km/h (80 mph) (10-min); 970 hPa (mbar)

On November 23, an area of low pressure formed 171 nm (317 km) west-northwest of Palau, with a flaring convection around the broad circulation with areas of formative banding along the southern periphery of the circulation. At 08:00 PHT (00:00 UTC), the system was given a high chance of tropical cyclone formation, according to PAGASA. Early the next day, the agency upgraded the system into a tropical depression, and was given the name Verbena replacing the name Vinta in 2017. Verbena made two separate landfalls on the same day, the first one over Bayabas, Surigao del Sur at 13:30 PHT (05:30 UTC), and the second one over Jagna, Bohol at 23:10 UTC (15:10 UTC). The JTWC also followed suit early on November 25 and dubbed Verbena as 33W. At 02:40 PHT (18:40 UTC) on November 25, Verbena made its third landfall over Talisay, Cebu, followed by a fourth landfall in Vallehermoso, Negros Oriental at 05:50 PHT (21:50 UTC). Verbena made its fifth and sixth landfalls over San Lorenzo, Guimaras at 07:40 PHT (23:40 UTC) and Miagao, Iloilo at 08:50 PHT (00:50 UTC) respectively. Verbena was then given the international name Koto by the JMA at 12:00 UTC as it intensified into a tropical storm. At 22:50 PHT (14:50 UTC), Koto made its seventh landfall over Linapacan, Palawan before emerging over the South China Sea, where JMA subsequently upgraded the system into a typhoon. On November 28, Koto started to gradually weaken as it moves through unfavorable conditions while the system stalls northward. At 06:00 UTC on December 1, the JMA downgraded Koto into a tropical depression as it barely moved due to weak steering flow.

Koto, along with the shearline, generated flooding and landslides that left two people missing in the Philippines, exacerbating effects left by recent Typhoon Kalmaegi and Typhoon Fung-wong.

=== Tropical Depression 34W ===
- Tropical depression (JMA)
- Tropical storm (SSHWS)
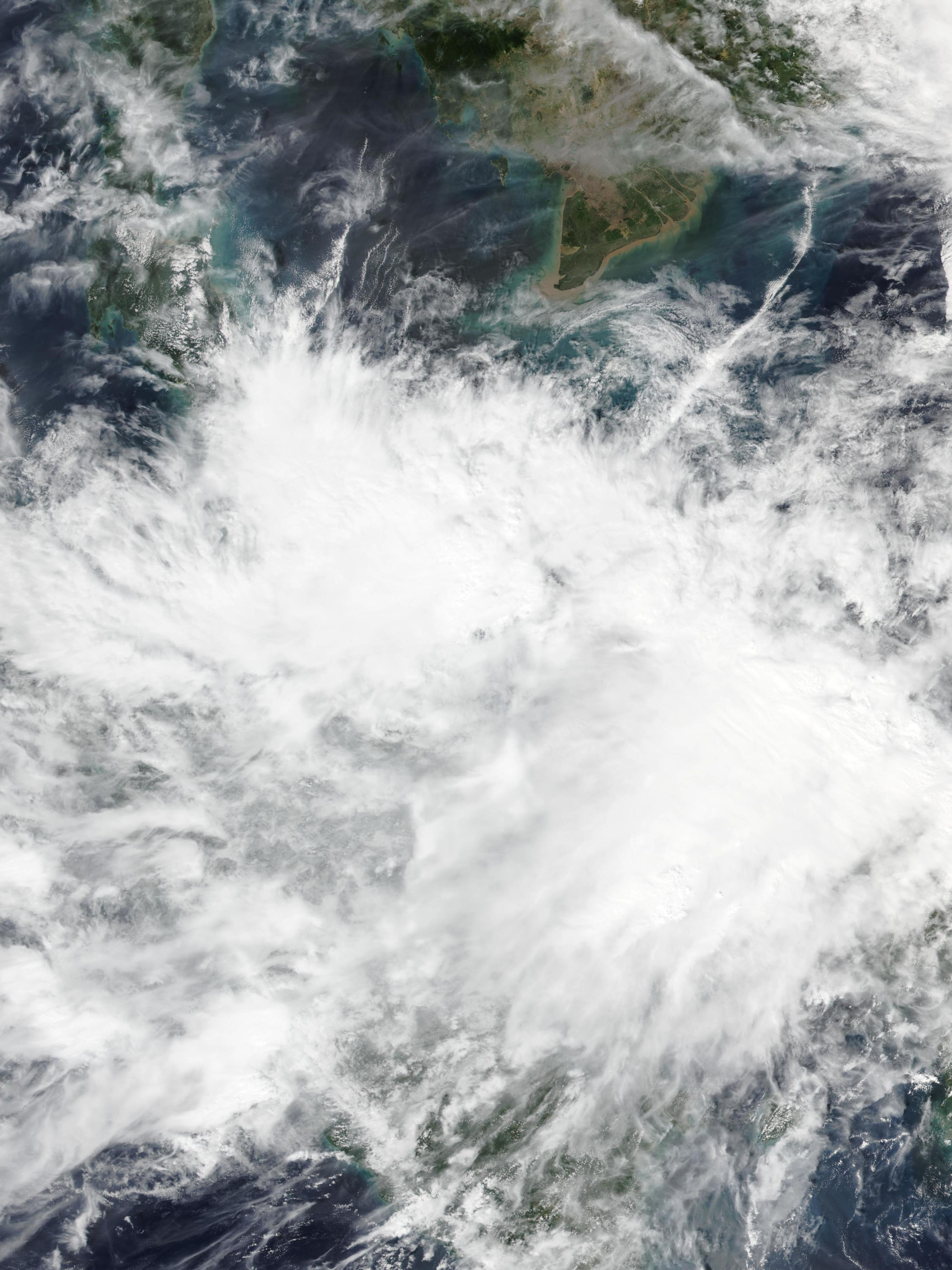
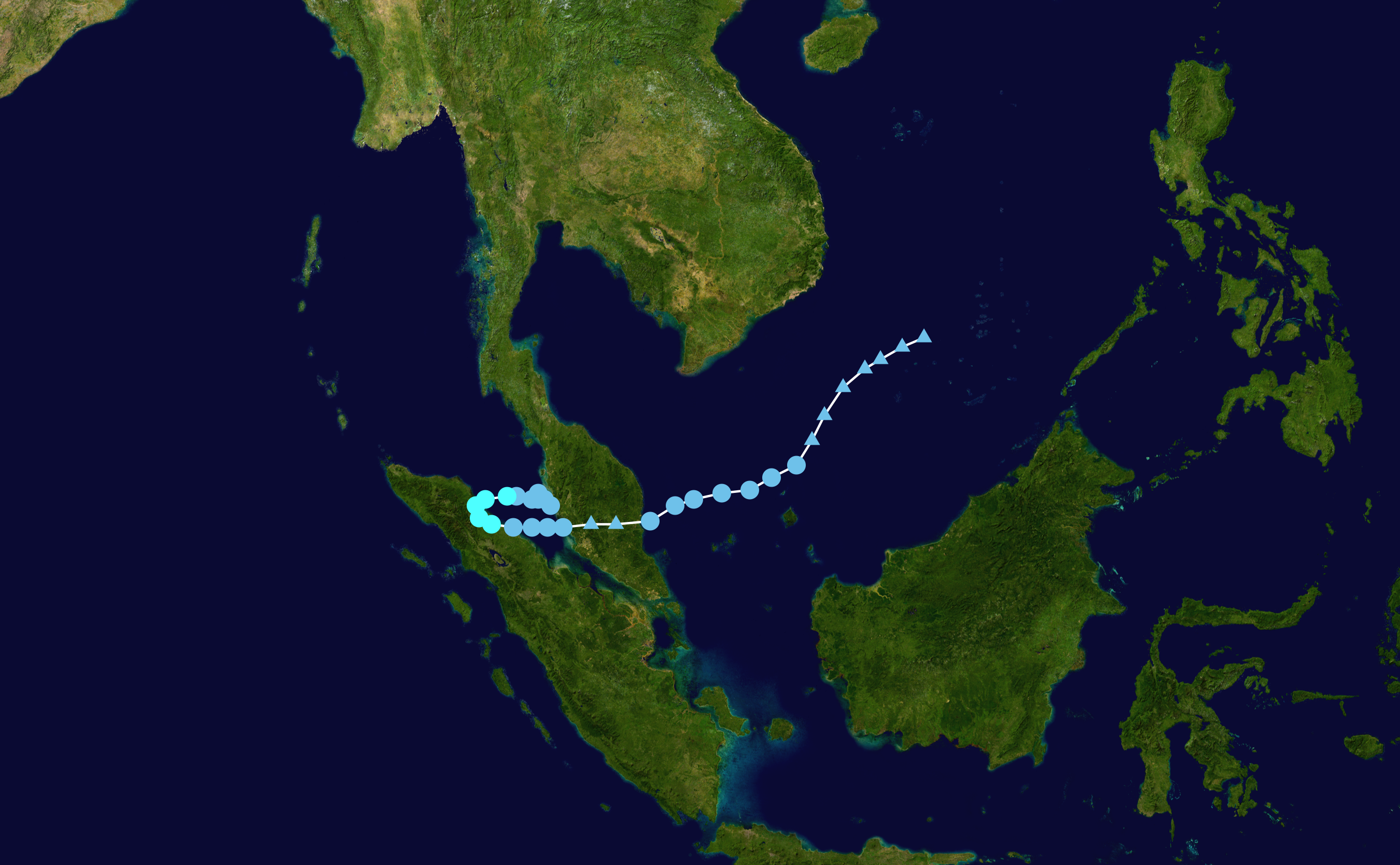
- Duration: November 27 (Entered basin) – November 30
- Peak intensity: 55 km/h (35 mph) (10-min); 1006 hPa (mbar)

A disturbance associated with the remnants of Cyclone Senyar crossed around 100ºE on November 27 and was identified by the JMA as a tropical depression, when the system was drifting eastward over the Strait of Malacca. It then made a second landfall in Selangor, moving over peninsular Malaysia. Senyar continued eastward slowly through that evening, maintaining tropical depression intensity. The JMA continued tracking Senyar as a tropical depression on November 28 as it emerged into the South China Sea while being steered northeastward. The JTWC also began monitoring it again as 34W, stating that it was a regeneration of Senyar. On November 30, both the JMA and JTWC ceased advisories on the system, noting it had dissipated, as the JMA removed it from their weather maps.

=== Tropical Depression Wilma ===
- Tropical depression (JMA)
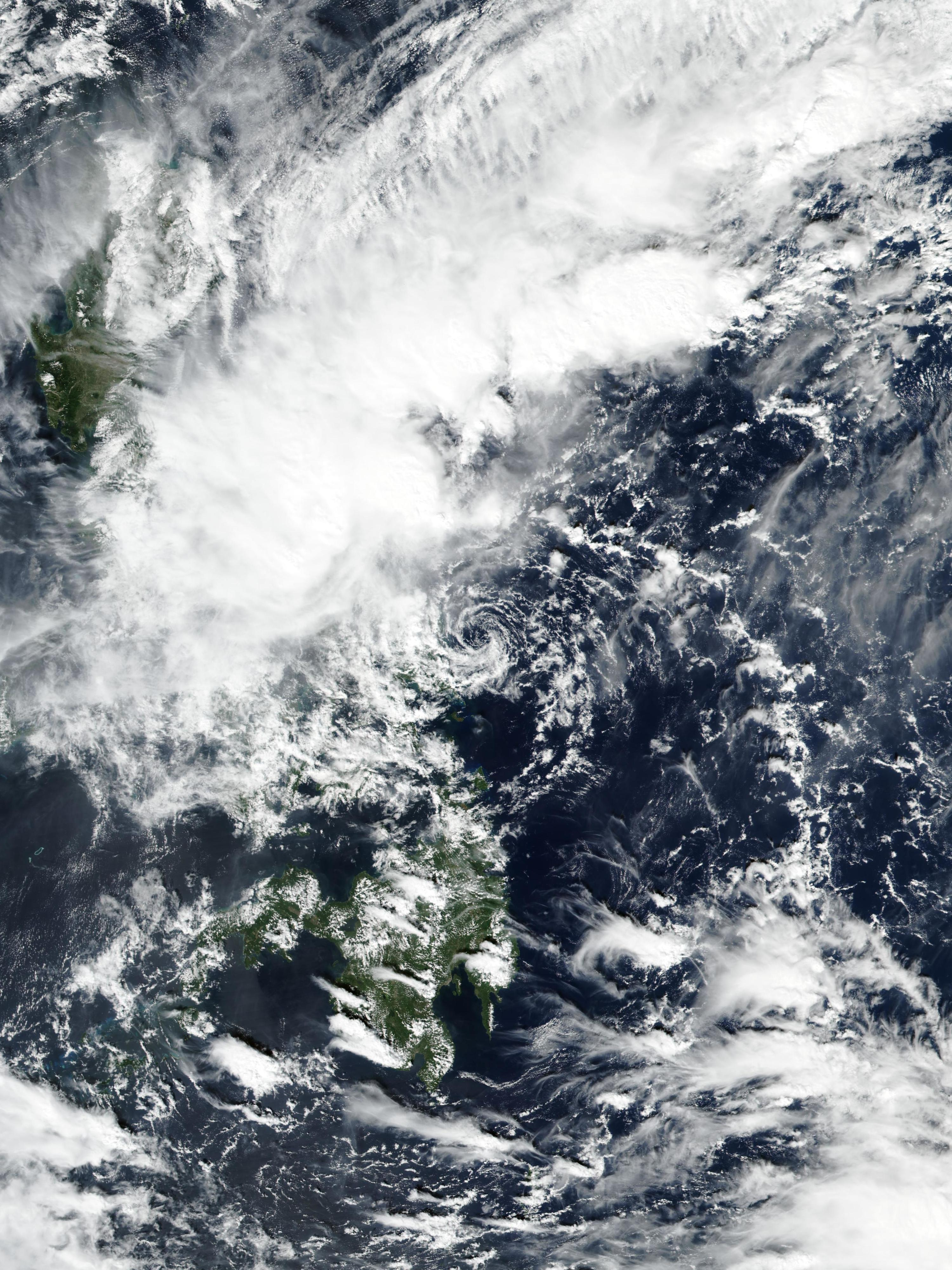
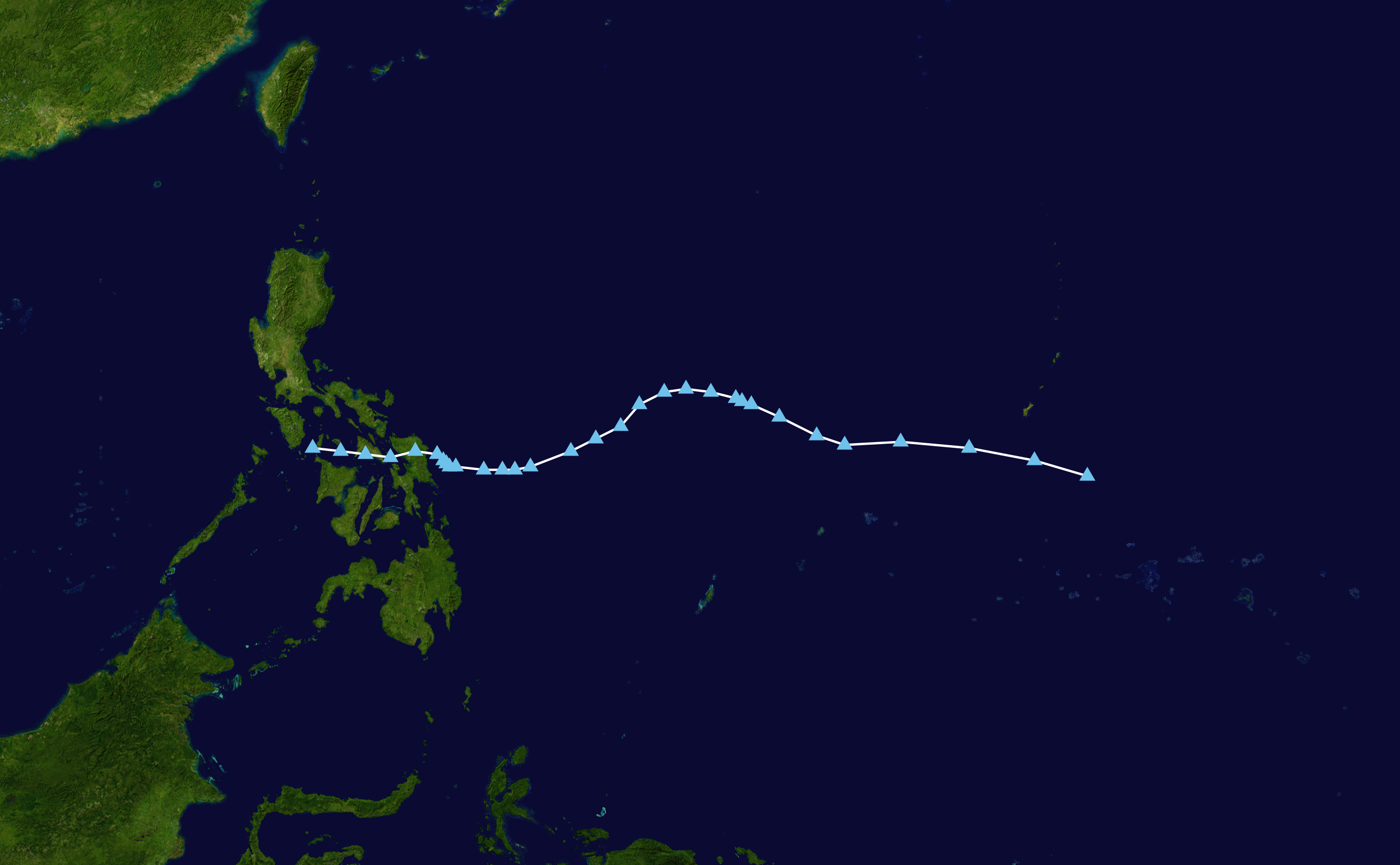
- Duration: December 1 – December 7
- Peak intensity: 55 km/h (35 mph) (10-min); 1004 hPa (mbar)

On December 1, the JMA designated a tropical depression north of Yap. At 08:00 PHT (00:00 UTC), PAGASA named the depression Wilma. The depression encountered dry air and high wind shear and failed to intensify. PAGASA issued Tropical Cyclone Wind Signal No. 1 across much of the southern and central Philippines, beginning on December 4. Late on December 6, the depression made landfall over Hilabaan Island in Dolores, Eastern Samar and again in Oras, Eastern Samar. On December 7, at 08:00 PHT (00:00 UTC), PAGASA discontinued advisories and downgraded Wilma into a remnant low as the system continued to encountered unfavorable conditions and terrain interaction.

During the passage of Wilma, 11,753 passengers were stranded in ports across the country, with thousands of boats unable to sail. The depression caused flooding in the Bicol Eastern Visayas, and Caraga regions, while eight roads were impassable. The national government extended ₱76,472 ($1,295.24) worth of relief assistance to those affected in the Caraga region. One person was reported missing in Albay.

=== Other systems ===
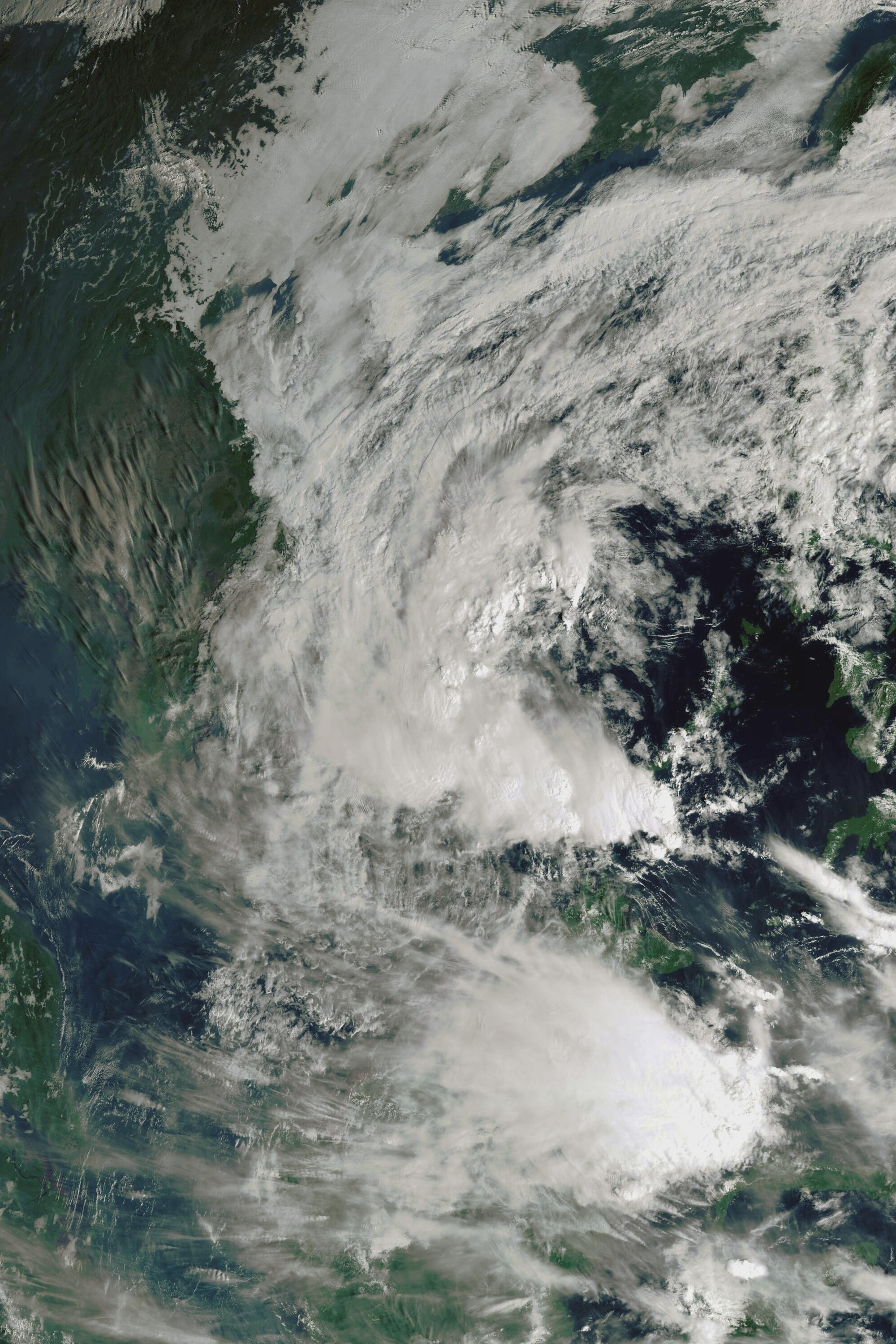
A tropical depression active on February 11.

- On February 11, the JMA noted that a tropical depression (Invest 93W) had formed west of the Philippines, 305 km (165 nmi; 190 mi) southwest of Kalayaan, Palawan. The next day, the JTWC began tracking the system around 267 nautical miles (494 km) west-northwest of the Spratly Islands, noting that it was in an unfavorable environment for development, with significant wind shear of 25–30 mph (35–45 km/h) and marginal sea surface temperatures (SSTs) of 26 °C (79 °F). As a result, the JTWC stopped tracking the system the next day, noting that it had dissipated. The JMA kept tracking the depression until it dissipated on February 15. Although it regenerated the next day, the JMA stopped tracking it by February 17.
  Alongside a low-pressure trough passing through Vietnam, rains from the depression caused several regions in the southeastern parts of the nation to break unseasonal rain records for the month of February, with Ho Chi Minh City recording its heaviest rainfall in the past twenty years. In the town of Long Thành, 175 mm (6.9 in) was recorded. Some towns, like Nhà Bè, saw their highest rainfall in 41 years. On Hòn Đốc island, rainfall reached 128.2 mm (5.05 in) in the early morning of February 16, highest in the Mekong Delta on record. Additionally, Puerto Princesa and other parts of Palawan saw severe flooding due to rains from the system, a shear line, and the intertropical convergence zone.
- On July 15, the JTWC began tracking a low-pressure system off the coast of the Ogasawara Islands, and later upgraded it to a tropical depression and designated it as 08W, although the JMA had not yet classified it as such; instead, the agency issued gale warnings for Japan's eastern coast. The system accelerated rapidly northward, reaching a forward speed of 61 km/h (38 mph) between 15:00 and 21:00 JST, following a track similar to that of Nari. After crossing Hokkaido, the JTWC downgraded the system to a remnant low and issued its final advisory the next day. Heavy rainfall associated with 08W injured two people and damaged or flooded 32 homes across Aichi, Mie, Shizuoka, Gifu, and Kanagawa Prefectures.
- On July 30, the JTWC marked a subtropical depression east of Japan and designated it Invest 92W. It dissipated a few hours later without being recognized by the JMA.
- On August 1, the JMA noted that a tropical depression had formed over the Gulf of Tonkin. Several hours later, it was removed from the JMA's weather forecast map. However, later that day, the system was reclassified as a tropical depression again, although it was short-lived and dissipated on the following day.
- The remnant low of Hurricane Iona entered the basin on August 2, and was analyzed as a tropical depression by the JMA. With a fully exposed and elongated circulation, the system slightly intensified afterwards east-southeast of Wake Island, but further weakened next day and dissipated on August 4.
- A tropical depression formed north of Wake Island on August 2. Two days later, the JTWC designated it as 14W. However, strong wind shear caused the system to dissipate late on August 4, as it merged with another disturbance southwest of Wake Island.
- Late on August 4, a tropical depression formed northwest of Wake Island, to the south of the remnants of 14W. Early on August 6, the JTWC designated the depression as 15W. However, dry air and wind shear prevented strengthening, and the depression dissipated later that day.
- On August 8, a tropical depression (Invest 96W) developed near northern Luzon. At 08:00 PHT (00:00 UTC), PAGASA likewise upgraded the system to a tropical depression and named it Fabian. Wind shear prevented further development, and the depression dissipated on August 9.
- On October 20, the JMA began tracking a weak tropical depression (Invest 97W) at 18:00 UTC. At 00:00 UTC of the following day, PAGASA named the depression Salome. Early on October 23, PAGASA upgraded Salome into a tropical storm despite being unrecognized by other agencies in that intensity. It was later downgraded into a tropical depression on the preliminary report. On the same day, JMA ceased advisories on Salome.
- On December 9, the remnants of Wilma re-developed west of the Philippines. Later that day, the JMA had declared that it dissipated.

== Storm names ==
Within the northwest Pacific Ocean, both the JMA and PAGASA assign names to tropical cyclones that develop in the region, which can result in a tropical cyclone having two names. The JMA's RSMC (Note: Regional Specialized Meteorological Centre) Tokyo–Typhoon Center assigns international names to tropical cyclones on behalf of the World Meteorological Organization's Typhoon Committee should they be judged to have 10-minute sustained wind speeds of 65 km/h (40 mph). PAGASA names tropical cyclones which move into or form as a tropical depression in their PAR, located between 135°E and 115°E and between 5°N and 25°N, even if the cyclone has had an international name assigned to it. Should the list of names for the region be exhausted, then names will be taken from an auxiliary list, the first ten of which are published each season. Unused names are marked in gray. The names of significant tropical cyclones will be retired by both PAGASA and the Typhoon Committee in the spring of 2026.

=== International names ===
During the season, 27 tropical storms developed in the Western Pacific, and all of them were named by the JMA once they had 10-minute sustained winds of 65 km/h (40 mph). The JMA selected the names from a list of 140 names, that had been developed by the 14 members nations and territories of the ESCAP/WMO Typhoon Committee. Retired names were announced during the 58th Session of the Typhoon Committee; though replacement names will be announced in 2027. During the season, the names Co-May, Nongfa, Ragasa, and Koto were used for the first (and only, in the cases of Co-May and Ragasa) time, after they replaced Lekima, Faxai, Hagibis, and Kammuri, which were retired following the 2019 season.

Wutip	Sepat	Mun	Danas	Nari	Wipha	Francisco	Co-May	Krosa	Bailu	Podul	Lingling	Kajiki	Nongfa
Peipah	Tapah	Mitag	Ragasa	Neoguri	Bualoi	Matmo	Halong	Nakri	Fengshen	Kalmaegi	Fung-wong	Koto	

==== Retirement ====
At their 58th Session in March 2026, the ESCAP/WMO Typhoon Committee announced that the names Wipha, Co-May, Mitag, Ragasa, Bualoi, Matmo, Kalmaegi, and Fung-wong would be removed from the naming lists due to the damages and deaths they caused respectively, and they will not be used again for another typhoon name. Replacement names will be announced in early 2027.

=== Philippines ===
Main list
Auring	Bising	Crising	Dante	Emong
Fabian	Gorio	Huaning	Isang	Jacinto
Kiko	Lannie	Mirasol	Nando	Opong
Paolo	Quedan	Ramil	Salome	Tino
Uwan	Verbena	Wilma	Yasmin (unused)	Zoraida (unused)
Auxiliary list
Alamid (unused)	Bruno (unused)	Conching (unused)	Dolor (unused)	Ernie (unused)
Florante (unused)	Gerardo (unused)	Hernan (unused)	Isko (unused)	Jerome (unused)

During the season, PAGASA used its own naming scheme for the 23 tropical cyclones, the highest since 2013, that either developed within or moved into their self-defined area of responsibility. This was the same list used during 2021 and is scheduled to be used again in 2029. All of the names were the same except for Jacinto, Mirasol and Opong, which replaced Jolina, Maring and Odette, respectively. These three names, as well as Uwan and Verbena after replacing Urduja and Vinta in 2017, were used for the first (and only, in the cases of Mirasol, Opong, and Uwan) time.

==== Retirement ====
On March 19, 2026, PAGASA announced that they removed the names Crising, Emong, Mirasol, Nando, Opong, Tino, and Uwan from its rotating naming lists due to the number of deaths and amount of damage each one caused and the contributing damages from other tropical cyclones, and they will not be used again for another typhoon name within the PAR. They were replaced with Chico, Elias, Magyawan, Nilad, Omar, Tala, and Urbano (Note: The name Upang was intended to replace Uwan, but was changed to Urbano as the latter has already been used to replace Ulysses, which was retired following the 2020 season.) respectively for the 2029 season.

== Season effects ==
This table summarizes all tropical systems that developed within or moved into the Western Pacific basin during 2025, defined as the region west of the 180th meridian. It also provides an overview of each system's intensity, duration, affected land areas, and any associated deaths or damage.

Name	Dates	Peak intensity			Areas affected	Damage (USD)	Deaths	Ref(s).
Name	Dates	Category	Wind speed	Pressure	Areas affected	Damage (USD)	Deaths	Ref(s).
TD	February 11–17	Tropical depression	Not specified	1006 hPa (29.71 inHg)	Vietnam, Malaysia, Palawan	None	None	
Wutip	June 10–15	Severe tropical storm	100 km/h (65 mph)	980 hPa (28.94 inHg)	Philippines, Southern China, Vietnam, Cambodia, Laos, Thailand	$303 million	21	
Auring	June 11–13	Tropical depression	55 km/h (35 mph)	1002 hPa (29.59 inHg)	Philippines, Taiwan, Eastern China	Minimal	1	
Sepat	June 21–26	Tropical storm	65 km/h (40 mph)	1004 hPa (29.65 inHg)	Bonin Islands, Izu Islands, Kantō region	None	None	
03W	June 24–27	Tropical depression	55 km/h (35 mph)	1002 hPa (29.59 inHg)	Philippines, Southern China, Vietnam	Unknown	6	
Mun	July 1–8	Severe tropical storm	95 km/h (60 mph)	990 hPa (29.23 inHg)	None	None	None	
Danas (Bising)	July 3–11	Typhoon	140 km/h (85 mph)	965 hPa (28.50 inHg)	Philippines, Taiwan, Ryukyu Islands, Southeastern China	$243 million	10	
Nari	July 9–14	Tropical storm	85 km/h (50 mph)	990 hPa (29.23 inHg)	Japan, Alaska	$1 million	None	
07W	July 11–14	Tropical depression	55 km/h (35 mph)	992 hPa (29.29 inHg)	Taiwan, Zhejiang, Kyūshū, South Korea	Minimal	None	
Wipha (Crising)	July 16–22	Severe tropical storm	110 km/h (70 mph)	975 hPa (28.79 inHg)	Philippines, Taiwan, Southern China, Vietnam, Thailand, Laos, Cambodia, Myanmar	>$717 million	20	(Note: According to the Philippine National Disaster Risk Reduction and Management Council: Tropical Storms Wipha (Crising), Francisco (Dante) and Comay (Emong) caused a total of 34 deaths and PHP21.4 billion (US$363 million) in damage.)
Co-May (Emong)	July 22–August 3	Severe tropical storm	110 km/h (70 mph)	975 hPa (28.79 inHg)	Philippines, Taiwan, Ryukyu Islands, Eastern China, South Korea	>$42.9 million	29	
Francisco (Dante)	July 22–26	Tropical storm	75 km/h (45 mph)	990 hPa (29.23 inHg)	Philippines, Ryukyu Islands, Taiwan, Eastern China	Unknown	Unknown	
Krosa	July 23–August 4	Typhoon	140 km/h (85 mph)	965 hPa (28.50 inHg)	Mariana Islands, Bonin Islands, Izu Islands, Kantō region	Minimal	None	
Bailu	July 30–August 5	Tropical storm	65 km/h (40 mph)	994 hPa (29.35 inHg)	Ryukyu Islands, Izu Islands, Alaska	Minimal	None	
TD	August 1–2	Tropical depression	Not specified	996 hPa (29.41 inHg)	Vietnam, Southern China	Minimal	None	
Iona	August 2–4	Tropical depression	55 km/h (35 mph)	1008 hPa (29.77 inHg)	None	None	None	
14W	August 2–4	Tropical depression	Not specified	1010 hPa (29.83 inHg)	None	None	None	
15W	August 4–6	Tropical depression	Not specified	1006 hPa (29.71 inHg)	None	None	None	
Podul (Gorio)	August 5–15	Typhoon	150 km/h (90 mph)	960 hPa (28.35 inHg)	Mariana Islands, Philippines, Yaeyama Islands, Taiwan, Southern China, Vietnam	$332 million	2	
Fabian	August 7–9	Tropical depression	Not specified	1006 hPa (29.71 inHg)	Philippines	Minimal	None	
17W	August 17–19	Tropical depression	55 km/h (35 mph)	1000 hPa (29.53 inHg)	Southern China, Vietnam	Minimal	None	
Lingling (Huaning)	August 17–23	Tropical storm	85 km/h (50 mph)	994 hPa (29.35 inHg)	Philippines, Ryukyu Islands, Kyūshū	Unknown	None	
Kajiki (Isang)	August 21–26	Typhoon	150 km/h (90 mph)	950 hPa (28.05 inHg)	Philippines, Southern China, Vietnam, Laos, Cambodia, Thailand, Myanmar	$386 million	17	
Nongfa (Jacinto)	August 27–31	Tropical storm	75 km/h (45 mph)	996 hPa (29.41 inHg)	Philippines, Southern China, Vietnam, Laos, Cambodia, Thailand, Myanmar	$3.59 million	1	
Peipah (Kiko)	September 2–5	Tropical storm	85 km/h (50 mph)	992 hPa (29.29 inHg)	Ryukyu Islands, West Japan, East Japan	$150 million	1	
Tapah (Lannie)	September 5–8	Severe tropical storm	110 km/h (70 mph)	980 hPa (28.94 inHg)	Philippines, Southern China	Unknown	None	
Mitag (Mirasol)	September 15–20	Severe tropical storm	95 km/h (60 mph)	992 hPa (29.29 inHg)	Philippines, Taiwan, Southern China	Unknown	Unknown	(Note: According to the Philippine National Disaster Risk Reduction and Management Council: Tropical Storms Mitag (Mirasol), Typhoon Ragasa (Nando) and Typhoon Bualoi (Opong) caused a total of 42 deaths and PHP5 billion (US$84.8 million) in damage.)
Ragasa (Nando)	September 16–25	Violent typhoon	205 km/h (125 mph)	905 hPa (26.72 inHg)	Philippines, Taiwan, Ryukyu Islands, Southern China, Vietnam, Laos, Cambodia, Thailand	>$2.85 billion	29	
Neoguri	September 17–28	Very strong typhoon	185 km/h (115 mph)	925 hPa (27.32 inHg)	Wake Island, Aleutian Islands	Minimal	None	
Bualoi (Opong)	September 22–29	Typhoon	120 km/h (75 mph)	975 hPa (28.79 inHg)	Caroline Islands, Philippines, Southern China, Vietnam, Laos, Cambodia, Thailand, Myanmar	>$950 million	93	
Matmo (Paolo)	September 30–October 6	Typhoon	130 km/h (80 mph)	975 hPa (28.79 inHg)	Philippines, Southern China, Vietnam, Laos, Thailand	$3.17 billion	39	
Halong	October 3–10	Very strong typhoon	185 km/h (115 mph)	935 hPa (27.61 inHg)	Bonin Islands, Izu Islands, Kantō region, Alaska	≥$125 million	2	
Nakri (Quedan)	October 6–14	Typhoon	130 km/h (80 mph)	970 hPa (28.64 inHg)	Mariana Islands, Ryukyu Islands, Southern Japan, Izu Islands, Kantō region	Minimal	None	
Fengshen (Ramil)	October 15–23	Severe tropical storm	95 km/h (60 mph)	990 hPa (29.23 inHg)	Mariana Islands, Philippines, Taiwan, Southern China, Vietnam	$391 million	54	
Salome	October 20–23	Tropical depression	55 km/h (35 mph)	1004 hPa (29.65 inHg)	Taiwan, Ryukyu Islands, Philippines	Minimal	None	
Kalmaegi (Tino)	October 31–November 7	Very strong typhoon	165 km/h (105 mph)	950 hPa (28.05 inHg)	Caroline Islands, Philippines, Vietnam, Laos, Cambodia, Thailand	$588 million	288	
Fung-wong (Uwan)	November 4–13	Very strong typhoon	175 km/h (110 mph)	935 hPa (27.61 inHg)	Caroline Islands, Mariana Islands, Philippines, Taiwan, Eastern China, Ryukyu Islands	>$104 million	34	
Koto (Verbena)	November 23–December 3	Typhoon	130 km/h (80 mph)	970 hPa (28.64 inHg)	Philippines, Vietnam, Cambodia	$9.6 million	2	
34W	November 27–30	Tropical depression	55 km/h (35 mph)	1006 hPa (29.71 inHg)	Indonesia, Thailand, Malaysia, Singapore, Brunei	Unknown	None	
Wilma	December 1–7	Tropical depression	55 km/h (35 mph)	1004 hPa (29.65 inHg)	Philippines	None	None	
TD	December 9	Tropical depression	Not specified	1006 hPa (29.71 inHg)	None	None	None	
Season aggregates
42 systems	February 11 – December 9		205 km/h (125 mph)	905 hPa (26.72 inHg)		>$10.8 billion	728	

== See also ==
- Weather of 2025
- Tropical cyclones in 2025
- Pacific typhoon season
- 2025 Atlantic hurricane season
- 2025 Pacific hurricane season
- 2025 North Indian Ocean cyclone season
- South-West Indian Ocean cyclone seasons: 2024–25, 2025–26
- Australian region cyclone seasons: 2024–25, 2025–26
- South Pacific cyclone seasons: 2024–25, 2025–26
