= Fang Lang =

Chinese-American sailor and Titanic survivor (1894–1986)

Wing Sun Fong
- 方榮山
- Fong in the early 1970s
- Born: 21 June 1894; Xiachuan Island, Taishan, Guangdong, China
- Died: 21 January 1986 (aged 91); Chinatown, Chicago, Illinois, United States
- Other name: Fang Lang
- Occupation: Merchant sailor
- Known for: Being one of the 6 Chinese survivors of the Titanic
- Spouse: Marrie Shum (m. 1955 or 1957; div. 1966)
- Children: 2

Wing Sun Fong (Chinese: 方榮山; 21 June 1894 – 21 January 1986), better known under the pseudonym Fang Lang, was a Chinese-American merchant sailor and waiter known for being one of six Chinese survivors of the sinking of the Titanic. He was one of the few people to go down with the ship and survive, being picked up later by Lifeboat No. 14.

== Early life ==
Fong was born in Shuiyang village (水洋) on Xiachuan Island, part of Taishan's Chuanshan Archipelago in the South China Sea, on 21 June 1894. The family was poor and had to subsist of vegetables foraged on the island, with Fong leaving in his teens to pursue coolie jobs in Southeast Asia. Although he never returned home, Fong kept a life-long letter correspondence with his younger sister, Fang Shulian (方樹蓮).

== Titanic ==
In the Titanic records, Fong was a third-class passenger listed under the pseudonym "Fang Lang". The records also stated his age as 26, although he was 18 at the time.

During the sinking, Fong failed to get on a lifeboat, but he was able to climb onto a floating piece of driftwood, likely a door or table, and use his belt to tie himself to it. He was later rescued on Lifeboat No. 14, when he was pulled from the waters by 5th officer Harold Lowe and reportedly even helped with rowing the boat after recovering in order to "keep warm." (Note: An often repeated allegation that Lowe initially refused to help Lang out of the water comes from a magazine article ghostwritten for Titanic passenger Charlotte Collyer in May 1912 and is almost certainly false. Lowe's biographer and Titanic historian Inger Shiel notes that Collyer nor any other woman was in the rescue vessel that went back for survivors, all passengers save one volunteer having been transferred to either boat 10, or 12 before it left Lowe's flotilla; a fact confirmed by several eyewitnesses, including two crew members and Collyer's own daughter. Supporting this are Collyer's further claims that the women in her lifeboat later had to row to the Carpathia once dawn arrived, which happened only to the occupants of boats 10 and 12. Rescue vessel 14 commanded by Lowe approached the Carpathia under sail, meaning Collyer could not have witnessed the events she described.)

After being rescued aboard RMS Carpathia, Fong and the rest of the Chinese survivors were transferred to the Donald Line's Annetta at Ellis Island, and departed for Cuba on 20 April. (Note: The documentary The Six made the inference that the seamen were prevented from leaving the Carpathia in compliance with the Chinese Exclusion Act but it is unclear whether this was really the case as they were sailors with the Donaldson Line and had intended to join the Annetta all along.)

== Later life ==
After the sinking, Fong worked on a fruit freighter for eight years. Fong arrived in Chicago in the 1920s where he attempted to become a merchant, with a laundromat and restaurant ultimately failing. Eventually, he moved to Milwaukee and became a server at the restaurant Lotus. In 1955, he married Marrie Shum (譚亞鳳) in Hong Kong and had two children with her, John and Tom Fong. The couple divorced in 1966, and Fong moved back to Chicago in 1973.

Fong died in Chinatown, Chicago, on 21 January 1986, aged 91 and is buried in Mount Auburn Cemetery in Stickney, Illinois.

== Legacy ==
Fong's rescue was featured in a deleted scene of the 1997 film, Titanic; its director, James Cameron, stated that his rescue was the direct inspiration of the character Rose.

In 2020, his story was told along with those of the other Chinese survivors in the film, The Six, directed by Arthur Jones. During production, the filmmakers had discovered several posts on Titanic-centred forums through Tom Fong, who connected the passenger Fang Lang to his father. A meeting between Tom Fong and the film crew convinced the latter of the claim, which was further substantiated through research by Chinese volunteers who identified the Fong ancestral home in 2018. The volunteers also uncovered more of Fong's past through local records and letters from his sister provided by extended family.

Fong was also the central figure in Steven Schwankert's 2025 book, The Six: The Untold Story of the Titanic's Chinese Survivors. His son Tom later met the grandson of Fifth Officer Lowe, Captain John Lowe, as part of the documentary and Lowe gave Fong a framed photograph of his grandfather as a keepsake.

In 2026, the Perelman Performing Arts Center announced the 2027 production of show The Unsinkable, which based on Fong's life. The show's artistic director, Bill Rauch, stated that Fong's family is assisting with the show's production. It is to run from 10 February to 7 March 2027.
