= Tropical Storm Tapah (2025) =

Pacific severe tropical storm in 2025

Severe Tropical Storm Tapah (Lannie)
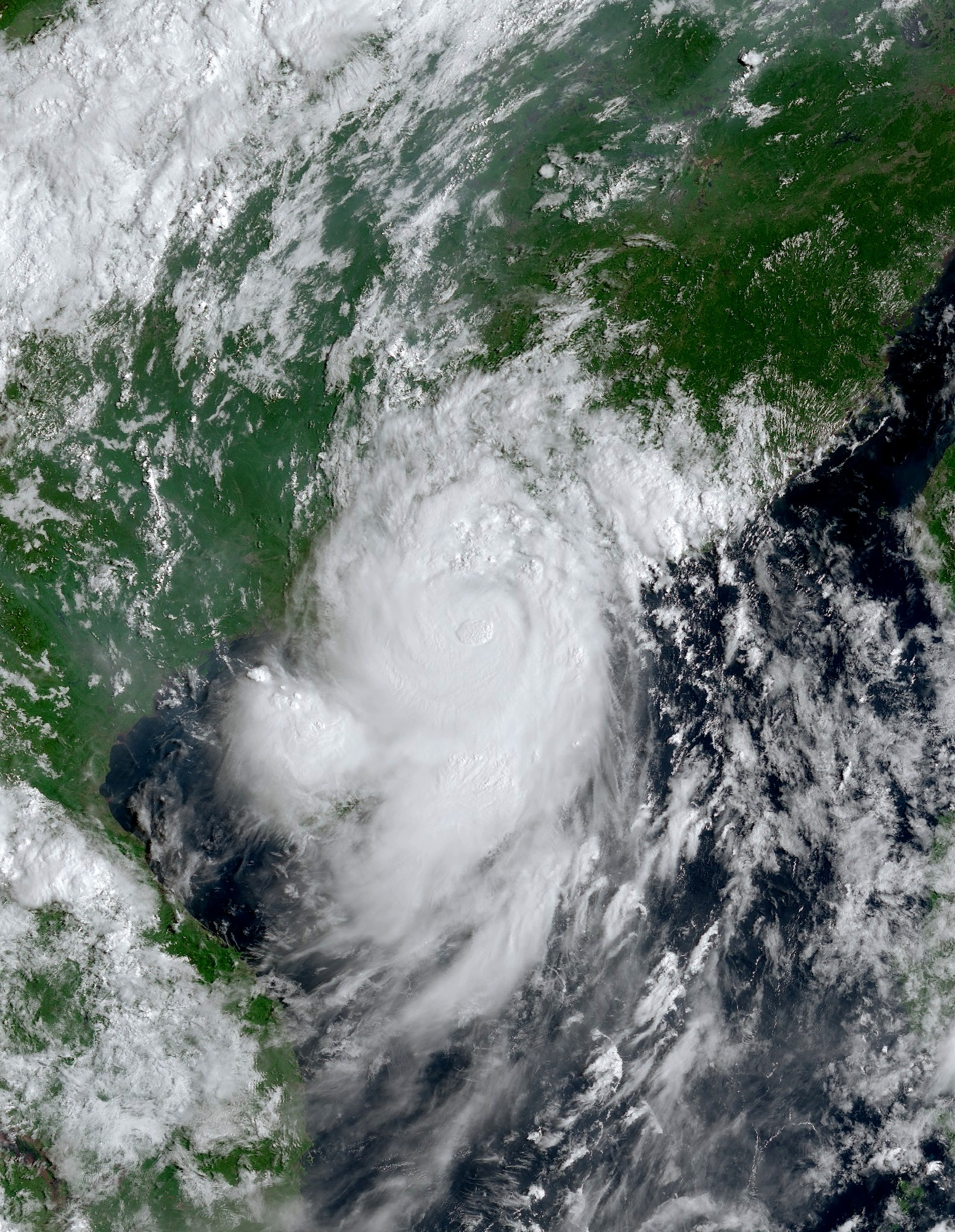
- Tapah approaching the Chuanshan Archipelago, China at near peak intensity on September 8

Meteorological history
- Formed: September 5, 2025
- Dissipated: September 8, 2025

Severe tropical storm
- 10-minute sustained (JMA)
- Highest winds: 110 km/h (70 mph)
- Lowest pressure: 980 hPa (mbar); 28.94 inHg

Tropical storm
- 1-minute sustained (SSHWS/JTWC)
- Highest winds: 110 km/h (70 mph)
- Lowest pressure: 983 hPa (mbar); 29.03 inHg

Overall effects
- Fatalities: 4
- Injuries: 12
- Damage: Unknown
- Areas affected: Philippines, Hong Kong, Macau, South China
- Part of the 2025 Pacific typhoon season

Severe Tropical Storm Tapah, (Note: The name Tapah (Malay: tapah, [tapah]) was contributed by Malaysia and refers to the Wallago catfish (Wallago attu) in Malay.) (Note: Initially classified as a typhoon, Tapah was downgraded on post-analysis to a severe tropical storm according to the Japan Meteorological Agency's Best Track data on December 17, 2025.) known in the Philippines as Tropical Depression Lannie, was a strong tropical cyclone that impacted Hong Kong, Macau, and South China in early September 2025. The sixteenth named storm of the 2025 Pacific typhoon season, Tapah originated from a low-pressure area west-southwest of Vigan, Ilocos Sur, on September 4. Two days later, as the area intensified into a tropical depression within the Philippine Area of Responsibility (PAR), PAGASA named it Lannie;

JTWC (Note: The Joint Typhoon Warning Center is a joint United States Navy – United States Air Force task force that issues tropical cyclone warnings for the western Pacific Ocean and other regions.) soon followed, designated it Tropical Depression 22W. At 21:00 JST (12:00 UTC), the Japan Meteorological Agency (JMA) (Note: The Japan Meteorological Agency is the official Regional Specialized Meteorological Center for the western Pacific Ocean.) classified 22W as a tropical storm and named it Tapah. Moving northwestward, Tapah was upgraded to a severe tropical storm early on September 8 before making landfall on Xiachuan Island at 07:00 CST (23:00 UTC). Shortly thereafter, it rapidly strengthened into a Category 1-equivalent typhoon and made a second landfall over Taishan, Guangdong, an hour later. Interaction with rugged terrain caused the system to quickly weaken, and it was last noted over Guilin, Guangxi, on September 9.

== Meteorological history ==
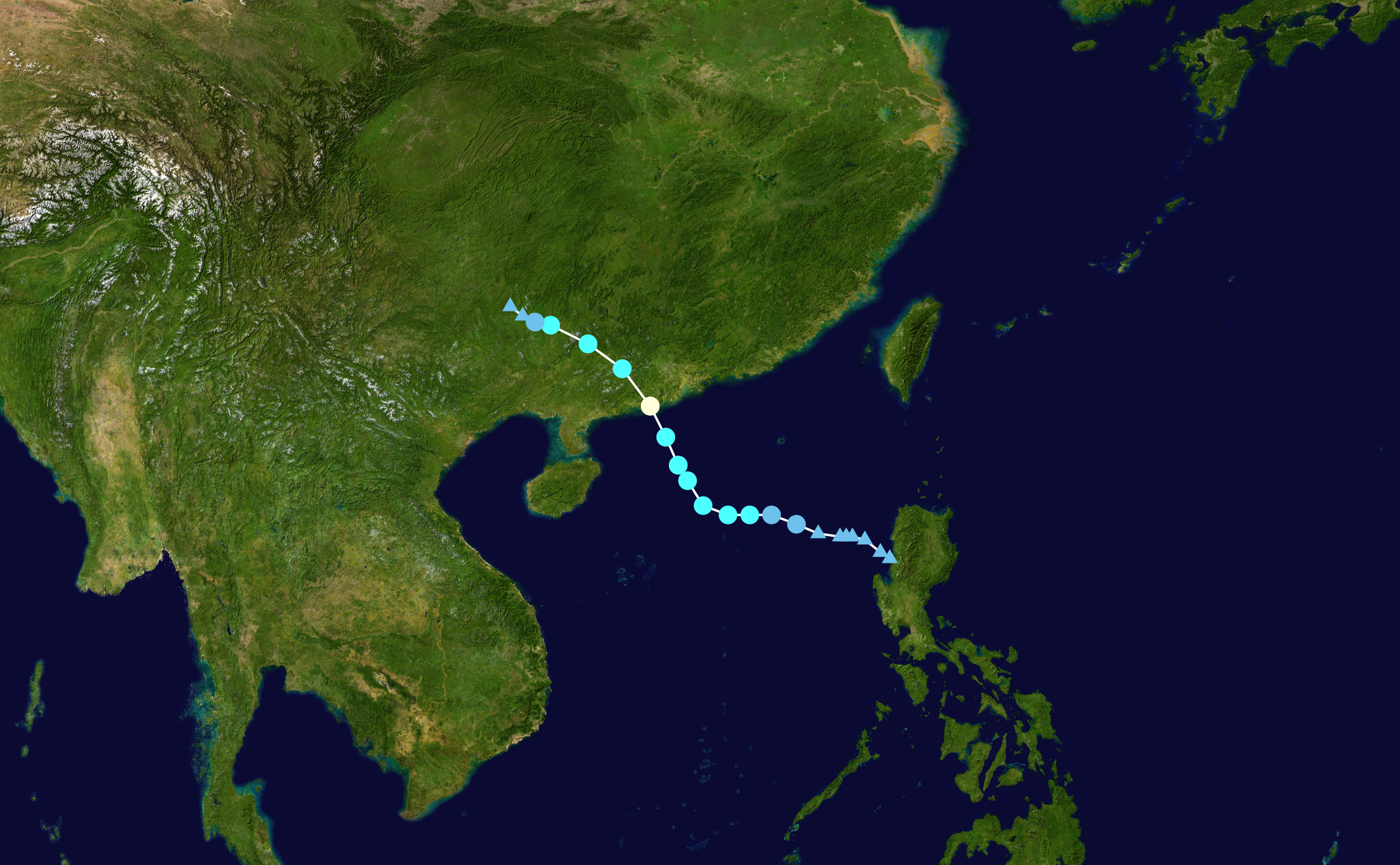
Map plotting the storm's track and intensity, according to the Saffir–Simpson scale Map key Saffir–Simpson scale Tropical depression (≤38 mph, ≤62 km/h) Tropical storm (39–73 mph, 63–118 km/h) Category 1 (74–95 mph, 119–153 km/h) Category 2 (96–110 mph, 154–177 km/h) Category 3 (111–129 mph, 178–208 km/h) Category 4 (130–156 mph, 209–251 km/h) Category 5 (≥157 mph, ≥252 km/h) Unknown Storm type Tropical cyclone Subtropical cyclone Extratropical cyclone, remnant low, tropical disturbance, or monsoon depression

On September 4, the JTWC began monitoring an area of low pressure west-southwest of Vigan, Ilocos Sur, noting favorable conditions for tropical cyclogenesis despite a poorly defined low-level circulation center (LLCC). The following day, the National Center for Hydro-Meteorological Forecasting (NCHMF) of Vietnam issued its first bulletin at 21:00 ICT (14:00 UTC), reporting the formation of a tropical depression over the South China Sea. At 02:00 PHT on September 6 (18:00 UTC), PAGASA classified the system as a tropical depression and assigned it the local name Lannie. Later that day, the JTWC issued a Tropical Cyclone Formation Alert (TCFA), citing a high likelihood of further development, and around 09:00 UTC, it upgraded the system to a tropical depression with the designation 22W. At 21:00 JST (12:00 UTC), the JMA upgraded the system to a tropical storm, assigning it the international name Tapah; the JTWC did the same three hours later. Satellite imagery showed Tapah with a partially exposed LLCC with deep convection consolidating near the center as it moved northwestward on September 7. Early on September 8, the JMA upgraded Tapah to a severe tropical storm before it made landfall on Xiachuan Island in the Chuanshan Archipelago of Guangdong, China at 07:00 CST (23:00 UTC). Shortly afterwards, the storm rapidly intensified into a Category 1-equivalent typhoon on the Saffir–Simpson scale with one-minute maximum sustained winds of 120 km/h (75 mph), making a second landfall over Taishan, Guangdong at 08:00 CST (00:00 UTC). By 11:00 HKT on September 9, the Hong Kong Observatory (HKO) had downgraded Tapah to a low-pressure area over inland Guangxi, where it was last noted approximately 70 km (43 miles; 38 nautical miles) west-southwest of Guilin.

== Preparations ==
=== Philippines ===
PAGASA raised the yellow rainfall warning over four provinces on the island of Luzon on September 5.

=== Hong Kong and Macau ===
The HKO issued Standby Signal No. 1 (Note: This signal is hoisted when a tropical system is within 800 km (430 nmi; 500 mi) of Hong Kong or Macau and is expected to affect the respective territory.) at 22:20 HKT (14:20 UTC) on September 5. The same signal was also hoisted by the Macau Meteorological and Geophysical Bureau (SMG) (Note: Portuguese: Direcção dos Serviços Meteorológicos e Geofísicos) on the following day at 00:30 MST (16:30 UTC). The signal was later upgraded to the Strong Wind Signal No. 3 at 02:40 HKT (18:40 UTC) on September 7; the SMG hoisted the same signal at 08:00 MST (00:00 UTC) on the same day.

Gale or Storm Northeast Signal No. 8 was hoisted at 21:00 MST on September 7 in Macau and was expected to remain in effect until at least 10:00 MST on the following day. The Education and Youth Development Bureau (DSEDJ) (Note: Portuguese: Direcção dos Serviços de Educação e de Desenvolvimento da Juventude) announced on September 7 that classes would be suspended on September 8. A yellow storm surge warning was also issued, and the government declared a state of immediate prevention. Meanwhile, in Hong Kong, Gale or Storm Southeast Signal No. 8 was issued instead at 21:20 HKT, followed by the amber rainstorm signal at 04:55 HKT on September 8 (20:55 UTC). The HKO also warned of possible storm surges, and classes were suspended for September 8. At 05:00 MST, the SMG replaced Northeast Signal No. 8 with Southeast Signal No. 8.

The HKO downgraded Southeast Signal No. 8 to Signal No. 3 at 13:10 HKT, while the same thing was done in Macau at 15:00 MST.

=== Elsewhere ===
In Guangdong Province, China, classes were suspended in Yangjiang, Yunfu and Zhuhai, and parts of Zhanjiang, Jiangmen, and Maoming. The orange typhoon alert was issued for portions of Yangjiang. Railway services between Shenzhen and Zhanjiang and between Guangzhou and Maoming were also suspended.

In Vietnam, warnings were issued as the Ministry of Agriculture and Environment instructed the People's Committees of northern mountainous provinces to closely monitor forecasts and warnings of heavy rainfall and the associated risks of floods, flash floods, and landslides. The ministry also called on provinces to ensure the safety of dykes and reservoirs.

== Impact ==
=== Philippines ===
Along with the southwest monsoon, (Note: Tagalog: Habagat) Tapah (known locally as Lannie) brought torrential rain and flooding to Metro Manila in the afternoon of September 6.

=== Hong Kong and Macau ===
In Hong Kong, three people were treated at accident and emergency (A&E) units of public hospitals, while 219 others sought refuge in shelters. Authorities received 104 reports of fallen trees. Ferry operations and most bus routes across the territory were suspended. Across both territories minor flooding from storm surge was observed on September 8 in low-lying areas, including Tai O on Lantau Island, Sam Ka Tsuen in New Kowloon, and Porto Interior on the Macau Peninsula. At Chek Lap Kok International Airport, about 100 flights were expected to be canceled. Additionally, an HK Express Airbus A320 operating flight UO235 struck an airport sign while landing on Runway 07L (the north runway) at 10:36 HKT on September 8; no injuries were reported.

=== Thailand ===
Although Tapah did not directly enter Thailand, the system strengthened the southwesterly monsoon across the region. Heavy rainfall was reported throughout the entire nation, especially the eastern regions. The Department of Disaster Prevention and Mitigation (DDPM) reported flooding influenced by Tapah across 88 districts in 30 provinces. 4 deaths were attributed to this event.

== See also ==
- Weather of 2025
- Tropical cyclones in 2025
- Typhoon Chaba (Caloy; 2022)
- Tropical Storm Pakhar (Jolina; 2017)
