= The Six (film) =

2021 documentary film directed by Arthur Jones

- The Six (2021)
- Chinese: 六人
- Directed by: Arthur Jones
- Produced by: Luo Tong
- Distributed by: TVF International; QC Media (China)
- Release date: 16 April 2021 (China)
- Running time: 107 minutes
- Languages: English & Chinese (subtitles)

The Six (Chinese: 六人) is a 2021 documentary film directed by Arthur Jones and produced by Luo Tong. The film chronicles the previously untold story of the six Chinese survivors of RMS Titanic, as well as exploring the legacy of Chinese exclusion laws in Canada, the United States, and the United Kingdom. The film is executive produced by Titanic director James Cameron.

== Background ==
There were eight Chinese male passengers traveling in third-class aboard Titanic, all of whom were professional mariners heading to New York to work on a fruit steamer. Six of the men survived the sinking. Four escaped on the same lifeboat as Titanic's owner J. Bruce Ismay, whilst another was the last person rescued alive from the water. Upon arrival in New York, the six Chinese men were held at the border, and deported within 24 hours. J. Bruce Ismay later claimed "it was afterwards discovered that there were four Chinamen concealed under the thwarts in the bottom of the boat." Louden-Brown, Paul (2001) [1991]. The White Star Line; An Illustrated History 1869-1934. Titanic Historical Society. ISBN 1903374006. Various media at the time also reported stories that they had behaved dishonourably (six of the eight survived whereas only 16% of other third class men survived), some claiming they had disguised as women while others repeated that they had hidden, and employed racist language and stereotypes, which Nancy Wang Yuen notes was, "reflective of the Chinese Exclusion Act that was in effect at the time."

The documentary included reconstructing the lifeboat at a school in Beijing, demonstrating that four people could not possibly have hidden under the seats.

Little was known of what happened to them after 1912, and research by the filmmakers suggests that some never even told their own families that they had been on the ship. Chinese migration to countries such as the United States and Canada in the late 19th to mid-20th centuries was defined by anti-Chinese immigration laws, which may explain why the survivors' stories were forgotten. According to Luo Tong, "They were mistreated not just in the days following the Titanic disaster, they were living under the shadow of discrimination their whole lives; even their families now are affected by that."

According to Professor Lily Cho, who participated in the production of The Six, the film uses popular interest in Titanic to highlight the "long history of anti-Asian racism." Several media outlets have drawn parallels between the experiences of the six, and the recent rise in anti-Asian violence that precipitated the #StopAsianHate movement. The role of government policy, propaganda and media in legitimizing racism, as well as a secrecy for fear of deportation in immigrant communities, have both been highlighted. The film itself draws parallels between the Chinese Exclusion Act and Executive Order 13769 in 2017.

== Production ==
The idea of making a film about Titanic's Chinese passengers was originally suggested to Jones by Steven Schwankert, a marine historian who had collaborated with him on the 2013 documentary The Poseidon Project. According to Schwankert, Jones was initially skeptical about covering a subject as well-documented as Titanic, but the question of how so little was known about the six Chinese, compared to the other survivors, stuck with them. "These were the only guys amongst those 700 that no one had ever claimed. They just completely disappeared. Why did they get ignored?" he told the Washington Post. Historian Renqiu Yu, who participated in the production of The Six, notes that the pervasive Anglo-Saxon perspective of Titanic has allowed little room for survivors such as the Chinese.

Early in production, the filmmakers found Tom Fong (方國民), who claimed that his father Wing Sun Fong (方榮山) was one of the Chinese passengers identified as "Lang Fang". Fong did not learn his father had been on Titanic until after Wing Sun Fong's death in 1985 and was able to verify the story with the help of the filmmakers. The filmmakers were able to trace other survivors, including Lee Bing, who settled in Ontario, Canada, and Chang Chip, who died in London in 1914. All eight were found to have come from Taishan, in Guangdong province, China.

The filmmaker's initial focus on Titanic shifted as their research uncovered more about what happened to the survivors in the years after 1912, with Jones noting the effect that their experiences still had on their families and communities over a century later. "Titanic was part of a much bigger story about race and immigration that is still playing out today," he told Variety.

The Six received international media attention in 2017, when a concept trailer went viral. The majority of filming would take place in 2018–2019, with James Cameron recording an interview and coming on board as executive producer later in production.

== Release ==
The Six was originally scheduled for theatrical release in 2020, but was delayed due to the COVID-19 pandemic. It had its first festival screening at Hainan Island International Film Festival in December 2020. It was released in cinemas nationwide in mainland China on April 16, 2021. The Six had its North American premiere at Vancouver International Film Festival in 2021.

Film Festival	Country	Notes
Hainan Island International Film Festival	China	Best Documentary (Nominated)
Beijing International Film Festival	China	Special Jury Award
Bangkok International Documentary Awards	Thailand	Best Documentary (Nominated)
Shanghai International Film Festival	China	
Vancouver International Film Festival	Canada	North American Premiere
Immigration Film Festival	USA	
Friday Harbor Film Festival	USA	
Philadelphia Asian American Film Festival	USA	
KDoc Film Festival	Canada	
Silk Road Film Festival	Ireland	

== Reception ==
The Six has received positive media and reviews. Lovia Gyarkye, writing for The Hollywood Reporter, called it, "a clear-eyed examination of global racism and various nations' anti-Chinese immigration policies," that presents a "penetrating argument for looking beyond written history for narrative reconstruction." These views were echoed by VIFF's programming team, who note the film "Masterfully [intertwines] the history of American immigration policy at the time of the Titanic to contemporary views on race and citizenship," adding it uncovers, "the sacrifices and discrimination these men suffered, finally granting them their rightful place in history." The National Observer gave it four out of five stars, calling it "engrossing".

At the 2021 Vancouver International Film Festival, the film won the Audience Award for most popular film in the Insights program.

== See also ==
- RMS Titanic
- Sinking of the Titanic
- Passengers of the Titanic
