= Arthur Jones (film director) =

British film director

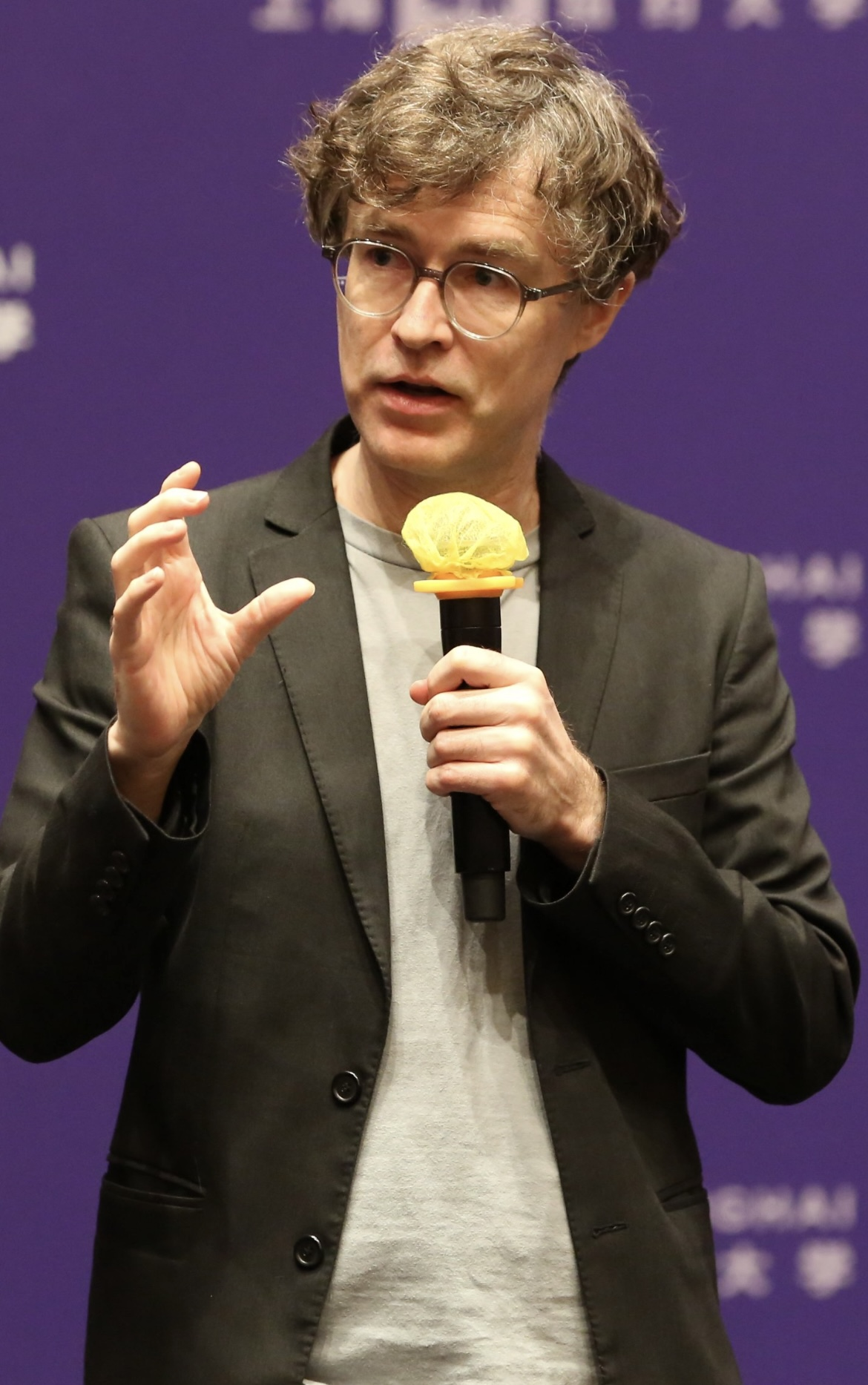
- Arthur Jones, talking at NYU in 2021
- Born: 25 October 1973 (age 52); Doncaster, England
- Occupations: Film director, producer
- Years active: 2006-present

Arthur Benjamin Jones (simplified Chinese: 罗飞; traditional Chinese: 羅飛, born 25 October 1973) is a British film director and producer.

== Biography ==
Jones was born in Doncaster, England. He studied English literature at the University of Cambridge. He arrived in China in 1996, and has been based in Shanghai since then. From 1998 to 2000, he was the first editor of the city magazine That's. From 2001 to 2007, he was China correspondent for Variety magazine and a noted expert on the Chinese film industry.

In 2006, he co-directed with his brother Luther Jones, the feature documentary A Farewell Song, about a group of retired traditional Chinese musicians who reunite to perform and record outside of the state-backed music industry. The film was backed by Channel 4 BRITDOC Foundation.

Between 2007 and 2012, he made a series of documentaries about cultural landmark events in Shanghai, including films about the Shanghai Special Olympics (2007) and the Shanghai World Expo (2012).

In 2013, the Jones brothers co-directed The Poseidon Project, about the search for a British submarine, lost off the coast of China in 1931. Featuring the work of explorer/researcher Steven Schwankert, it won Best Documentary Feature at the Pennine Film Festival 2014.

In 2021, Arthur Jones directed The Six (film), a feature documentary about the six Chinese survivors of the Titanic disaster. The film was executive produced by James Cameron and released in cinemas across China and on television worldwide to wide acclaim. It won the Special Jury Award at the Beijing International Film Festival (2022] and the Audience Award at Vancouver Film Festival (2021).

His documentary feature "What Colour is the Morning Sky?", backed by Chinese streamer Tencent Video, was released in early 2025, charted a year in the life of a grade four class at a tiny primary school in the mountains of China's Yunnan Province where many of the children live with their grandparents, their parents working hundreds of miles away in the big city.

Jones has also directed television documentary series for international broadcasters including the China sections of Flatpack Empire for the BBC, and "Ancient China from Above" for National Geographic Channel.

He was on the jury for the documentary section of the Shanghai International Film Festival in 2020, and on the jury for short documentaries at Beijing International Film Festival in 2024. He is a regular featured speaker at film events across China.

== Filmography ==
Year	English title	Chinese title	Note
2006	A Farewell Song	阳关三叠	
2013	The Poseidon Project	海神号事件	
2021	The Six	六人	
2024	What Colour is the Morning Sky?	早晨的星空有黑色有白色	
