= Tropical Storm Pakhar (2012) =

Pacific tropical storm in 2012

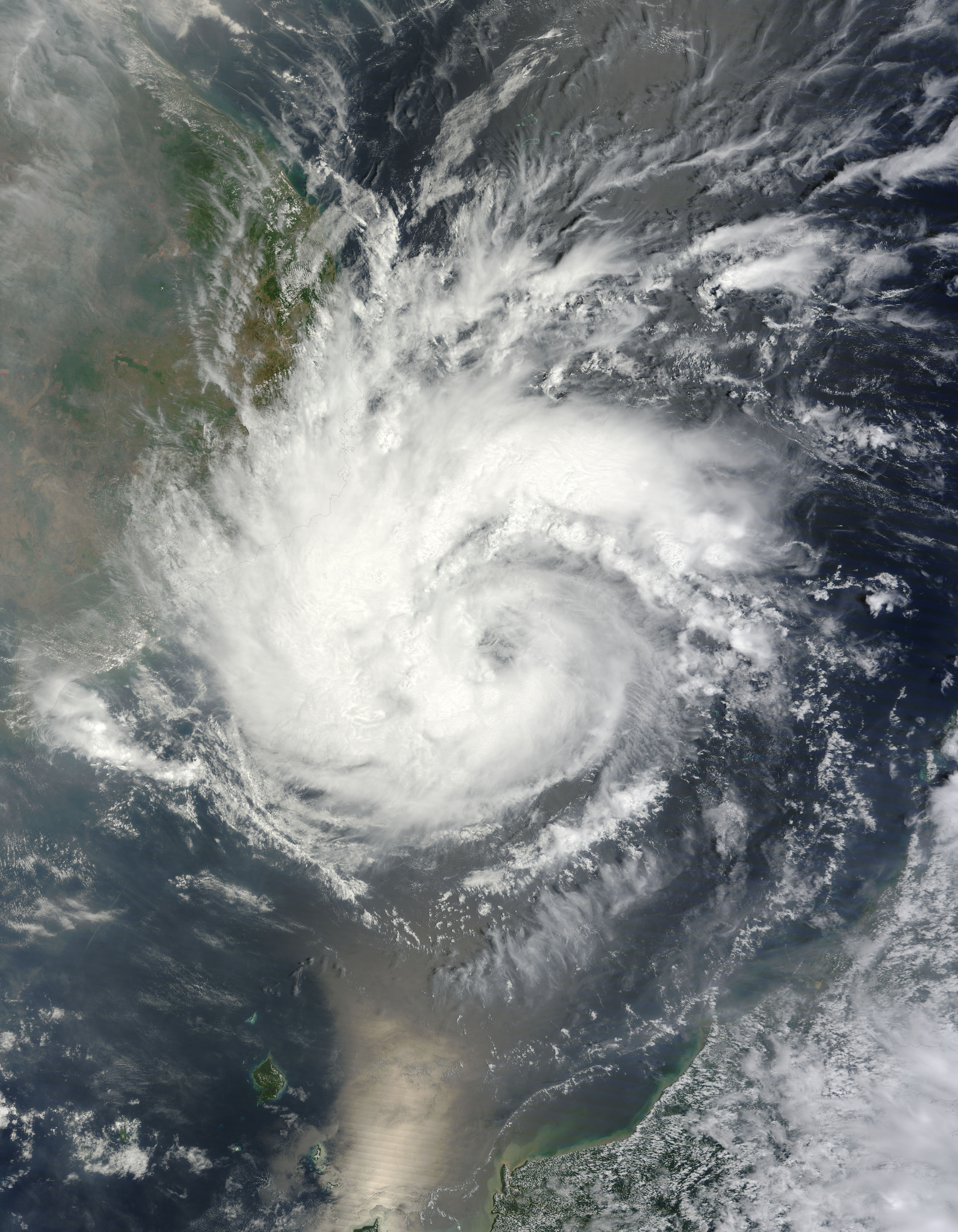
- Tropical Storm Pakhar near its peak intensity, to the east of Ho Chi Minh City, Vietnam on 30 March

Meteorological history
- Formed: March 26, 2012
- Dissipated: April 2, 2012

Tropical storm
- 10-minute sustained (JMA)
- Highest winds: 75 km/h (45 mph)
- Lowest pressure: 986 hPa (mbar); 29.12 inHg

Tropical storm
- 1-minute sustained (SSHWS/JTWC)
- Highest winds: 110 km/h (70 mph)
- Lowest pressure: 978 hPa (mbar); 28.88 inHg

Overall effects
- Fatalities: 15 total
- Missing: 3
- Damage: $53.9 million (2012 USD)
- Areas affected: Philippines, Vietnam, Cambodia, Laos, Thailand
- Part of the 2012 Pacific typhoon season

Tropical Storm Pakhar (Note: The name Pakhar (Lao: ປາຂ່າ, [paː˩ kʰaː˧]) was contributed by Laos and refers to the Irrawaddy dolphin (Orcaella brevirostris) in Lao.) was a strong tropical storm that affected the Philippines and the Indochina as a whole in early-April 2012. The fourth tropical depression and the first named storm of the annual typhoon season, Pakhar's origins can be traced from a disturbance that persisted to the northwest of Palau. Located in an overall unfavorable environment, the disturbance crossed the Philippine archipelago before subsequently developed into a tropical depression on March 26. Now under favorable conditions, the depression intensified to a tropical storm, receiving the name Pakhar from the JMA. On the other hand, the JTWC upgraded it to a Category 1 typhoon due to an eye feature; however, this was short-lived as the agency downgraded back Pakhar to a tropical storm due to the system entering colder sea surface temperatures. On April 2, the system made landfall near Vũng Tàu, Vietnam and it dissipated thereafter. Its remnants also affected Cambodia, Laos and Thailand.

15 fatalities are confirmed from Pakhar: 5 in the Philippines and the other 10 are from Vietnam. The damages from the storm are estimated at $53.9 million (2012 USD).

== Meteorological history ==
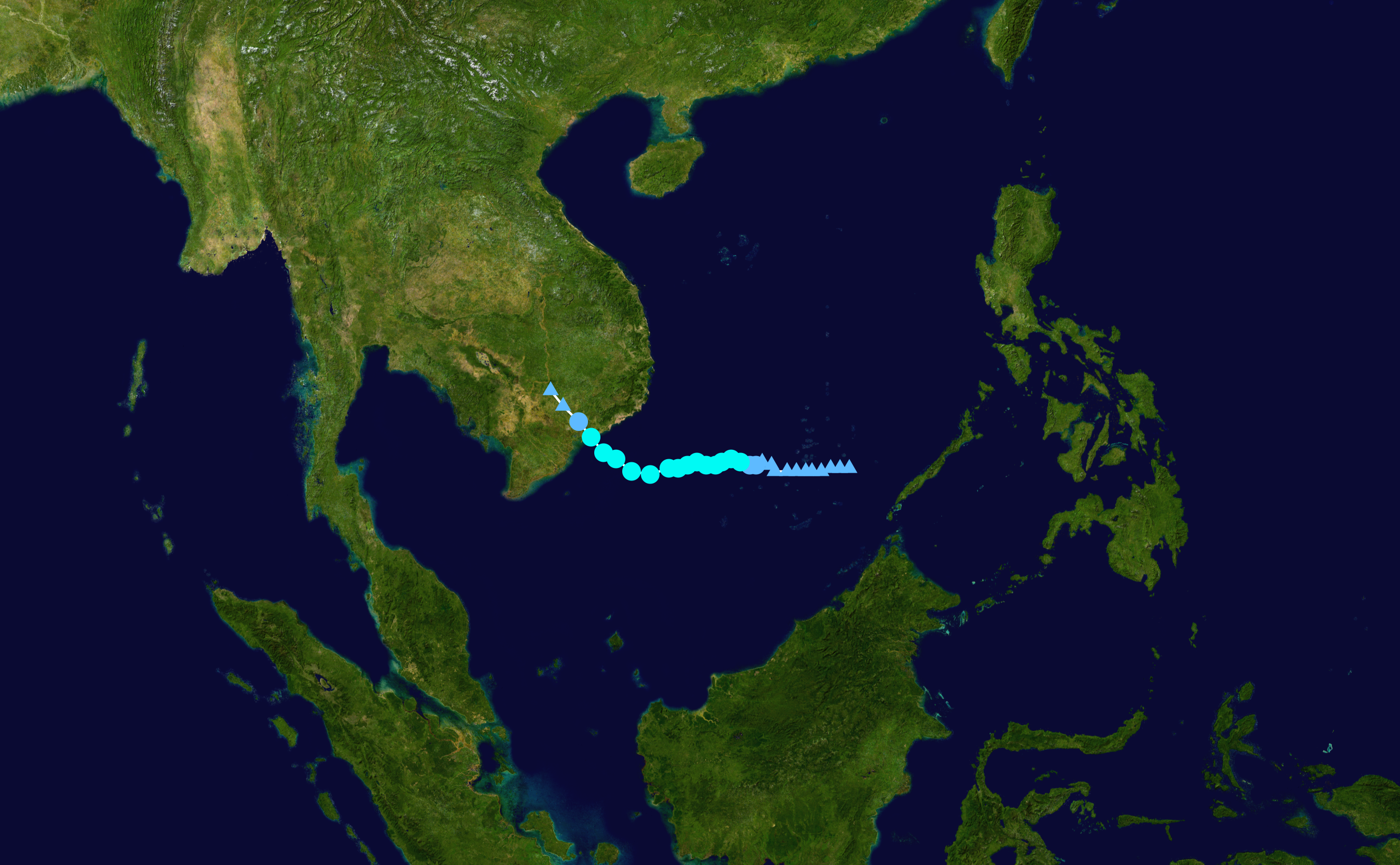
Map plotting the storm's track and intensity, according to the Saffir–Simpson scale Map key Saffir–Simpson scale Tropical depression (≤38 mph, ≤62 km/h) Tropical storm (39–73 mph, 63–118 km/h) Category 1 (74–95 mph, 119–153 km/h) Category 2 (96–110 mph, 154–177 km/h) Category 3 (111–129 mph, 178–208 km/h) Category 4 (130–156 mph, 209–251 km/h) Category 5 (≥157 mph, ≥252 km/h) Unknown Storm type Tropical cyclone Subtropical cyclone Extratropical cyclone, remnant low, tropical disturbance, or monsoon depression

On March 17, a tropical disturbance formed to the northwest of Palau. Located in an unfavorable environment, with moderate vertical wind shear and cold sea surface temperatures, the disturbance didn't develop significantly and it passed on Visayas and Palawan between March 22 and 23. By the next day, the JMA upgraded the disturbance to a tropical depression over the South China Sea; however, this was short-lived as the agency downgraded the depression back to a disturbance the next day due to the system's deteriorating structure. On March 26, the JMA reupgraded the system to a tropical depression due to its good structure and redeveloping convection around its low-level circulation. On March 28, the JTWC issued a TCFA on the tropical depression, as its LLCC began to consolidate more. Early the next day, the JMA upgraded the system to a tropical storm, receiving the name Pakhar. As a banding eye emerged, the JTWC upgraded Pakhar to a Category 1 typhoon early on March 30. However, the system was downgraded to a severe tropical storm on March 31 due to land interaction and cooler sea surface temperatures. It made landfall in southern Vietnam, near Vũng Tàu on April 1, and was subject to weakening. The JMA and JTWC reported that Pakhar weakened to a tropical depression for the final time inland, and was last noted over Cambodia on that day.

== Impact ==
=== Philippines ===
Pakhar did not make landfall in the Philippines as a tropical cyclone, but its predecessor brought heavy rains to parts of the region. Various parts of central and southern Luzon, as well as the northern Visayas region, were flooded. Due to flash flooding in Basud, Camarines Norte, 128 families were forced to leave their homes. The rains triggered a few landslides, which damaged or destroyed a few houses. Five people were killed and three others were reported missing across the affected area.

=== Indochina ===
Due to flash floods and high winds in Vietnam, ten people were killed and several others were wounded. The storm made landfall in Khánh Ha Province, which was the hardest hit. The storm destroyed about 4,400 homes in the district, and thousands of acres of rice paddy were flooded. Officials in Ho Chi Minh City announced that 600 homes and schools had been destroyed. Total damage were finalized at ₫1.12 trillion (US$53.9 million). Sections of Cambodia, Laos, and Thailand received rain from the system's remnants.

== See also ==
- Other tropical cyclones named Pakhar
- Typhoon Kai-tak (2012) - a tropical cyclone that briefly affected Vietnam.
