= List of storms named Pakhar =

The name Pakhar (Lao: ປາຂ່າ, [paː˩ kʰaː˧]) has been used for three tropical cyclones in the western North Pacific Ocean. The name was contributed by Laos and refers to the Irrawaddy dolphin (Orcaella brevirostris) in Lao. It replaced the name Matsa (Lao: ມັດສາ, [mat˧ saː˩]), which refers to the Suvannamaccha mermaid in Southeast Asian legends, following the 2005 Pacific typhoon season.

- Tropical Storm Pakhar (2012) (T1201, 02W) – struck Vietnam.
- Severe Tropical Storm Pakhar (2017) (T1714, 16W, Jolina) – strong tropical storm that made landfall on Luzon and later in South China.
- Tropical Storm Pakhar (2022) (T2225, 29W, Rosal) – remained out at sea but caused 8 indirect deaths in the Philippines.

Preceded by Yamaneko	Pacific typhoon season names Pakhar	Succeeded by Sanvu
