= Shangchuan Island =

Island off the coast of Guangdong Province, China

Coordinates: 21°39′55″N 112°47′44″E

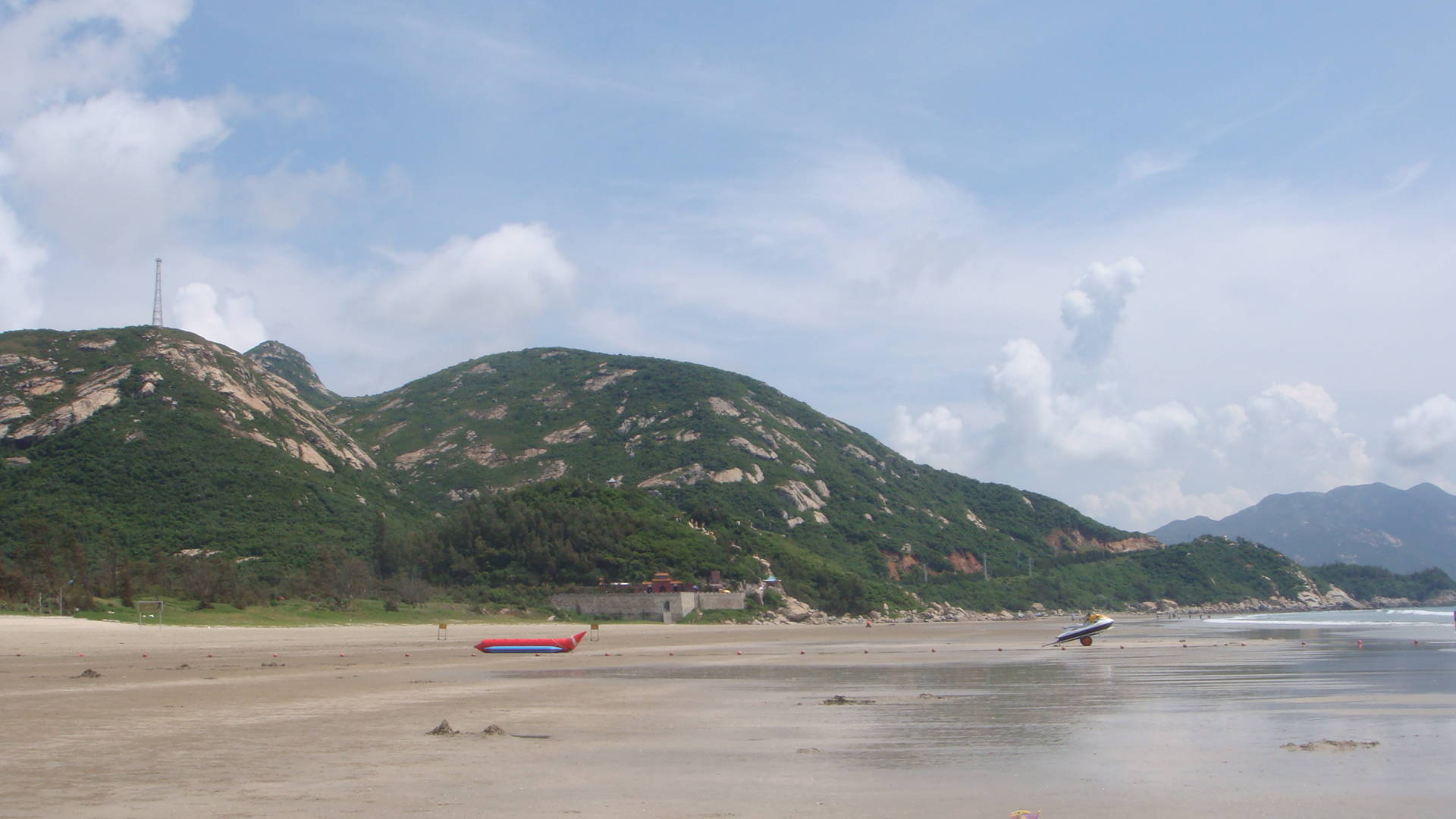
Flying Sand Beach (飞沙滩) on the eastern coast of Shangchuan Island.

Shangchuan Island (Chinese: 上川岛; pinyin: Shàngchuāndǎo, also known as "Schangschwan", "Sancian", "Sanchão", "Chang-Chuang", "St. John's Island" or "St John Island") is the main island of Chuanshan Archipelago on the southern coast of Guangdong, China.

Administratively, it is a part of Chuandao (川岛镇), Taishan. Located 14 kilometers (8.7 mi) from the mainland, it became the largest island in Guangdong after Hainan Island (the largest island in the country) was carved out of the province in 1988.

The area of the island is 139.87 square kilometers (54.00 sq mi), and has a population of 16,320.

It is known for having been the place of death of St. Francis Xavier. Nowadays, it is a tourist site in Guangdong.

== History ==
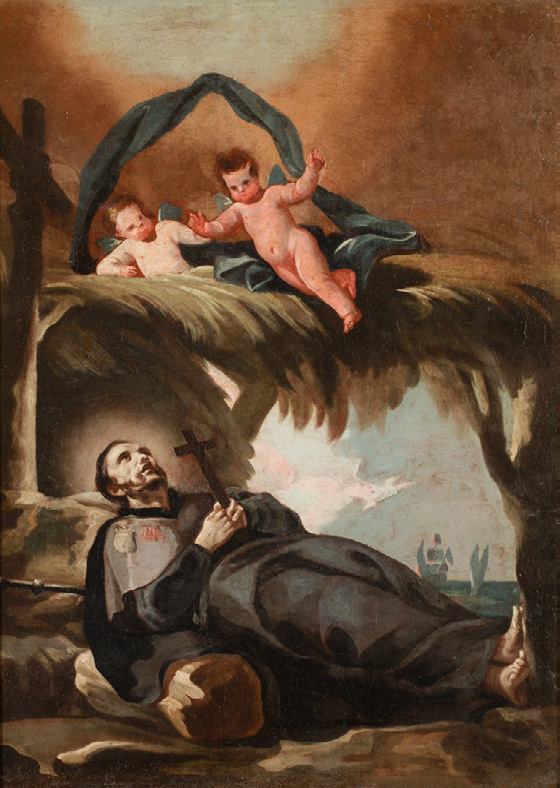
Painting of the death of St. Francis Xavier by Francisco Goya.

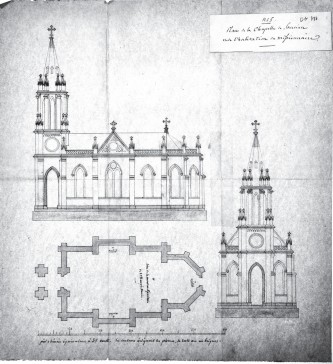
Plan of the Chapel of the Tomb of St Francis Xavier at Shangchuan Dao, by Achille-Antoine Hermitte. Completed in 1869.

The island was called Shangchuan Shan (上川山) in the Ming dynasty, as recorded in the Records of the Unity of the Great Ming (大明一統志) published in 1461.

Shangchuan Island was one of the first bases established by the Portuguese off the China coast, during the 16th century. They abandoned this base after the Chinese government gave consent for a permanent and official Portuguese trade base at Macau in 1557.

The Spanish (Navarrese) Jesuit missionary St. Francis Xavier died on the island on December 3, 1552, as he was waiting for a ship to take him to mainland China. There is a small chapel that commemorates his death place, designed by Achille-Antoine Hermitte and completed in 1869.

== Geography ==
The island has been isolated from the mainland since the last ice age. It is located near Xiachuan Island, which lies west of Shangchuan. The two islands, together with smaller islets, form Chuanshan Archipelago.

Shangshuan Island has an area of 137.3 km^{2} and a 217 km coastline.

Settlements on the island include:

- Dalangwan
- Shadi (沙堤), a fishing port on the southwestern coast

== Climate ==
Climate data for Shangchuan Island, elevation 22 m (72 ft), (1991–2020 normals, extremes 1981–present)
Month	Jan	Feb	Mar	Apr	May	Jun	Jul	Aug	Sep	Oct	Nov	Dec	Year
Record high °C (°F)	27.2 (81.0)	27.9 (82.2)	29.6 (85.3)	31.9 (89.4)	35.0 (95.0)	35.4 (95.7)	37.0 (98.6)	37.0 (98.6)	35.9 (96.6)	35.1 (95.2)	31.7 (89.1)	28.2 (82.8)	37.0 (98.6)
Mean daily maximum °C (°F)	18.6 (65.5)	19.6 (67.3)	22.3 (72.1)	25.9 (78.6)	29.2 (84.6)	30.8 (87.4)	31.4 (88.5)	31.5 (88.7)	30.6 (87.1)	28.0 (82.4)	24.5 (76.1)	20.3 (68.5)	26.1 (78.9)
Daily mean °C (°F)	15.5 (59.9)	16.6 (61.9)	19.4 (66.9)	23.1 (73.6)	26.5 (79.7)	28.2 (82.8)	28.6 (83.5)	28.5 (83.3)	27.6 (81.7)	25.2 (77.4)	21.5 (70.7)	17.2 (63.0)	23.2 (73.7)
Mean daily minimum °C (°F)	13.4 (56.1)	14.6 (58.3)	17.3 (63.1)	21.2 (70.2)	24.5 (76.1)	26.2 (79.2)	26.4 (79.5)	26.1 (79.0)	25.3 (77.5)	23.1 (73.6)	19.4 (66.9)	15.0 (59.0)	21.0 (69.9)
Record low °C (°F)	2.7 (36.9)	4.2 (39.6)	4.1 (39.4)	10.4 (50.7)	16.2 (61.2)	20.3 (68.5)	22.0 (71.6)	21.8 (71.2)	17.7 (63.9)	13.1 (55.6)	6.4 (43.5)	3.8 (38.8)	2.7 (36.9)
Average precipitation mm (inches)	31.5 (1.24)	37.2 (1.46)	75.5 (2.97)	165.1 (6.50)	313.1 (12.33)	451.4 (17.77)	312.4 (12.30)	393.4 (15.49)	320.2 (12.61)	118.5 (4.67)	37.8 (1.49)	32.0 (1.26)	2,288.1 (90.09)
Average precipitation days (≥ 0.1 mm)	5.6	8.4	11.7	12.4	14.2	17.7	17.0	16.9	13.8	7.1	5.2	4.9	134.9
Average relative humidity (%)	76	82	86	87	85	85	84	85	81	75	74	71	81
Mean monthly sunshine hours	130.0	95.0	88.3	113.0	165.9	182.2	224.6	200.0	187.8	198.6	169.4	154.2	1,909
Percentage possible sunshine	38	29	24	30	41	45	55	51	51	55	51	46	43
Source: China Meteorological Administrationall-time extreme temperaturesall-time October record

== Economy ==
Shangchuan and Xiachuan have been established as a Tourism Open Integrated Experimental Zone (旅游开发综合试验区, pinyin: lǚyóu kāifā zōnghé shìyàn qū).

Feisha Beach Resort (飞沙滩旅游区) is a commercial tourist resort located on the island's eastern shore.

== Transportation ==
Shangchuan Island is linked by ferry to Guanghai, Haiyan (Shanju) and Xiachuan Island. Shanzui Harbor provide ferry services between the islands and mainland.

== See also ==
- Chuanshan Archipelago
- Tamão, Lampacau, Shuangyu
- List of islands of the People's Republic of China
- List of islands in the South China Sea
- List of Jesuit sites
