= HMS Poseidon =

Submarine

Coordinates: 37°50′N 122°14′E

- HMS Poseidon

History

United Kingdom
- Name: HMS Poseidon
- Builder: Vickers Shipbuilding and Engineering, Barrow-in-Furness
- Laid down: 5 September 1928
- Launched: 22 August 1929
- Commissioned: 5 May 1930
- Fate: Sunk on 9 June 1931

General characteristics
- Class & type: Parthian-class submarine
- Displacement: 1,475 long tons (1,499 t) surfaced; 2,040 long tons (2,070 t) submerged
- Length: 260 ft (79 m)
- Beam: 28 ft (8.5 m)
- Draught: 13 ft 8 in (4.17 m)
- Propulsion: Diesel-electric; 2 Admiralty diesel engines, 4,400 hp (3,300 kW); 2 Electric motors, 1,530 hp (1,140 kW); 2 shafts
- Speed: 17.5 knots (20.1 mph; 32.4 km/h) surfaced; 9 kn (10 mph; 17 km/h) submerged
- Range: 8,500 nmi (15,700 km) at 10 kn (12 mph; 19 km/h)
- Complement: 59
- Armament: 8 × 21 inch (533 mm) torpedo tubes (6 bow, 2 stern); 1 × 4 in (102 mm) deck gun; 2 × machine guns

HMS Poseidon (P99) was a Parthian-class submarine designed and built by Vickers Shipbuilding and Engineering in Barrow-in-Furness, England for the Royal Navy, launched on 22 August 1929. She spent most of her short career assigned to the Yellow Sea region, based at the Royal Navy's Weihai naval base in mainland China. In 1931, the submarine sank after a collision with the steamship Yuta north of Weihai. The submarine was later secretly salvaged by the Chinese in 1972.

== Service history ==
At about 12:12 on 9 June 1931, while exercising on the surface with the submarine tender Marazion 20 mi (32 km) north of the vessels' base at Weihai, and despite excellent visibility, Poseidon collided with the Chinese merchant vessel SS Yuta.

31 of the submarine's crew managed to scramble into the water before the submarine sank to the seabed 130 ft (40 m) below within a few minutes. The aircraft carrier HMS Hermes, heavy cruiser HMS Berwick and sister submarine HMS Perseus led the rescue operations. Poseidon was equipped with Davis Submerged Escape Apparatus which had come into service two years earlier. This was a closed circuit underwater breathing system which provided the wearer with a supply of pure oxygen and a canvas drogue to slow the rate of ascent. Despite the submarine not being equipped with specialised escape compartments or flooding valves, eight of the crew managed to leave the forward end of the boat, although two failed to reach the surface and one died later. Twenty-one crew died in total.

A consequence of the successful escape of part of the crew was to change Admiralty policy from advising crews to wait for the arrival of assistance to attempting to escape from the submarine as soon as possible. This policy was announced in the House of Commons in March 1934.

== Salvage ==
The secret salvaging of the submarine in 1972 by China's then newly formed underwater recovery units was described in 2002 in an article in the popular Chinese magazine Modern Ships (Chinese: 现代舰船; pinyin: Xiàndài jiàn chuán). This was not known about in the West until the researcher and journalist Steven Schwankert discovered that article with a Google web search and later read it in a Hong Kong library.

In the former British naval cemetery on the island of Liugong, gravestones, bearing clearly legible names, dates and epitaphs of the lost sailors were found in haphazard stacks by historians looking into the sinking of HMS Poseidon and its salvage by the Chinese. The British government asked the Chinese government for an explanation. Results of this research are told in Schwankert's book Poseidon: China's Secret Salvage of Britain's Lost Submarine and the documentary film The Poseidon Project.

== See also ==
- Project Azorian – US CIA's secret Soviet submarine salvage project (1974)
