= Tropical Storm Pakhar (2017) =

Pacific severe tropical storm in 2017

Severe Tropical Storm Pakhar (Jolina)
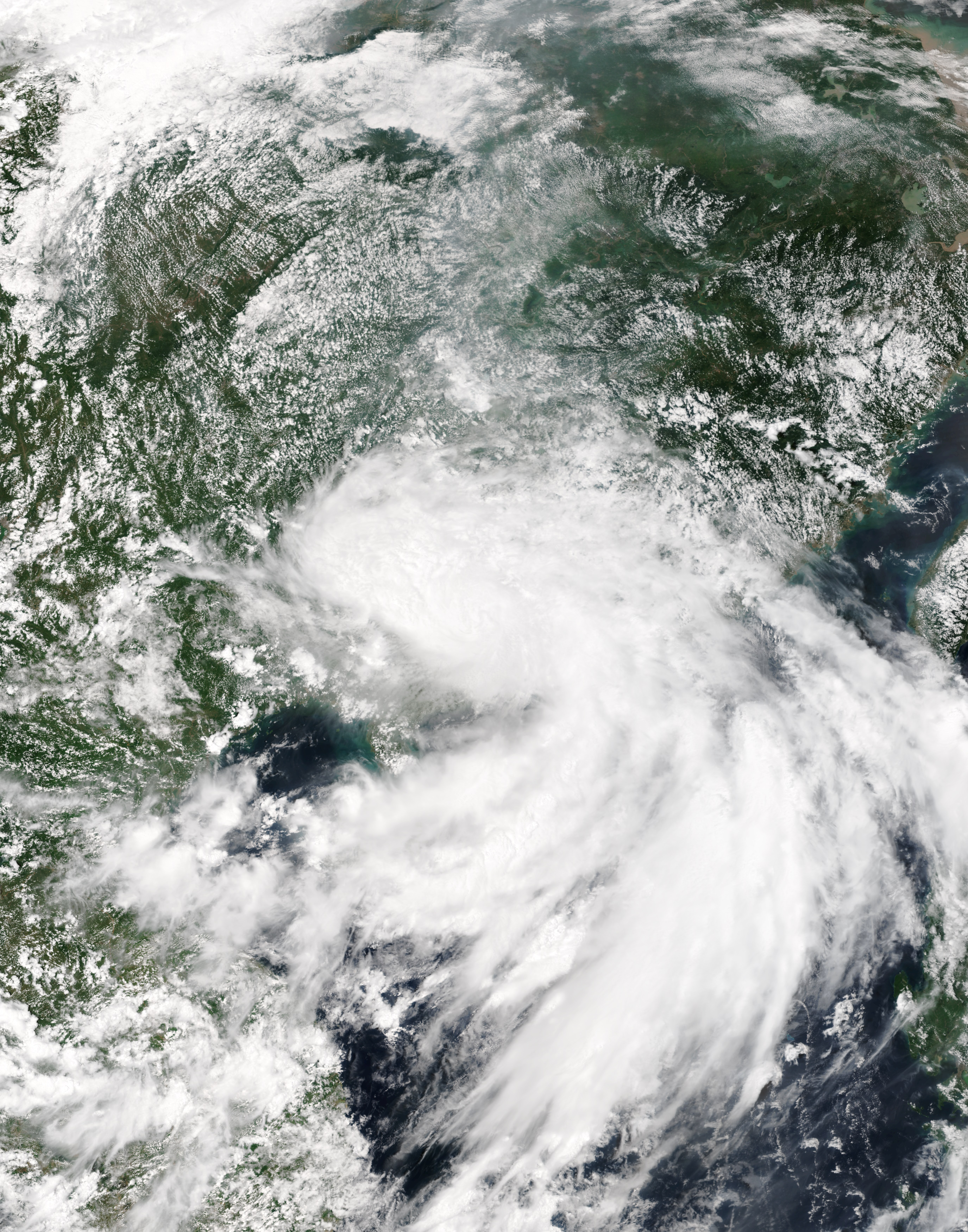
- Pakhar making landfall in China at peak intensity on August 27

Meteorological history
- Formed: August 24, 2017
- Dissipated: August 28, 2017

Severe tropical storm
- 10-minute sustained (JMA)
- Highest winds: 100 km/h (65 mph)
- Lowest pressure: 985 hPa (mbar); 29.09 inHg

Tropical storm
- 1-minute sustained (SSHWS/JTWC)
- Highest winds: 110 km/h (70 mph)
- Lowest pressure: 983 hPa (mbar); 29.03 inHg

Overall effects
- Fatalities: 13 total
- Damage: $115 million (2017 USD)
- Areas affected: Philippines, South China, Hong Kong, Macau, Vietnam, Thailand
- IBTrACS
- Part of the 2017 Pacific typhoon season

Severe Tropical Storm Pakhar, (Note: The name Pakhar (Lao: ປາຂ່າ, [paː˩ kʰaː˧]) was contributed by Laos and refers to the Irrawaddy dolphin (Orcaella brevirostris) in Lao.) known in the Philippines as Tropical Storm Jolina, was a strong tropical storm that impacted the Philippines and South China during late August 2017. The storm followed Typhoon Hato which affected the same areas just a few days prior. Pakhar, the fourteenth named storm of the 2017 Pacific typhoon season, developed from a tropical depression to the east of Luzon during August 24 and intensified into a tropical storm later that day. Pakhar then made landfall in Aurora on August 25, before gradually intensifying and peaking as a severe tropical storm by August 27, making landfall over Taishan, Jiangmen in Guangdong Province.

The storm caused 16 provinces in the Philippines to raise warnings, while classes were suspended as a precaution. Some provinces received risk of flooding. In China, Macau, and Hong Kong, 206 flights were canceled while Macau and Hong Kong hoisted alarms and warnings.

In the Philippines, Pakhar caused a dam and multiple bridges to overflow. A total of 3,391 people were affected and a total of PH₱41.27 million (US$808 thousand) were destroyed in the province of Aurora. In China, floods were spotted, and emergency personnel were deployed to generate electricity and help rescue people. As a result, 13 people were killed, 67 people were injured, and about 6,000 people were evacuated. Damages in China totaled to CN¥760 million (US$114.4 million).

== Meteorological history ==
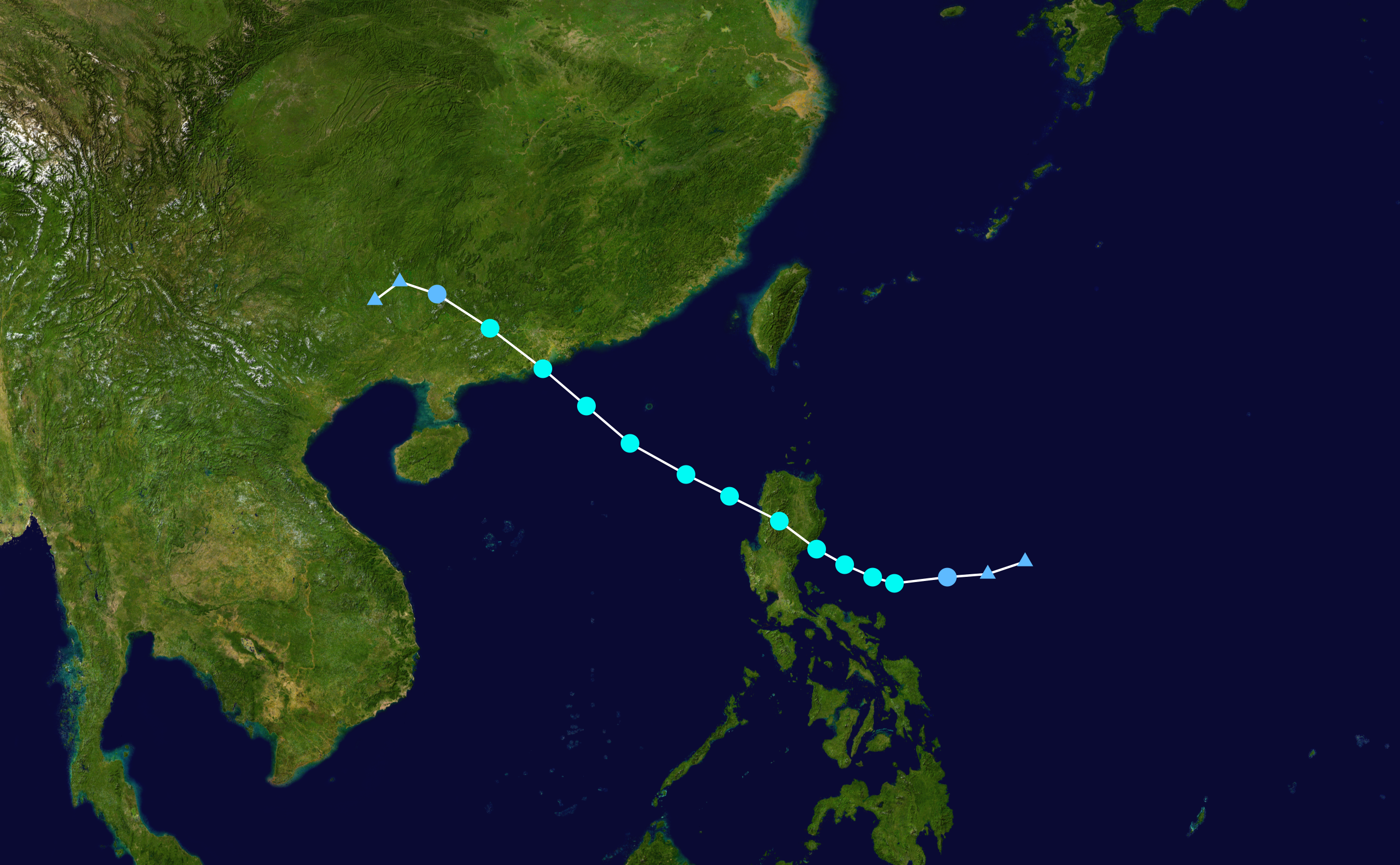
Map plotting the storm's track and intensity, according to the Saffir–Simpson scale Map key Saffir–Simpson scale Tropical depression (≤38 mph, ≤62 km/h) Tropical storm (39–73 mph, 63–118 km/h) Category 1 (74–95 mph, 119–153 km/h) Category 2 (96–110 mph, 154–177 km/h) Category 3 (111–129 mph, 178–208 km/h) Category 4 (130–156 mph, 209–251 km/h) Category 5 (≥157 mph, ≥252 km/h) Unknown Storm type Tropical cyclone Subtropical cyclone Extratropical cyclone, remnant low, tropical disturbance, or monsoon depression

On August 23, the Joint Typhoon Warning Center (JTWC) started to monitor a tropical disturbance that had developed about 895 km (556 mi) to the north of the island of Palau. The next day, the Japan Meteorological Agency (JMA) classified the system as a weak tropical depression, while the JTWC issued a Tropical Cyclone Formation Alert (TCFA). Six hours after the TCFA, the JMA began issuing advisories on the depression after they have determined that the system contained winds of 55 km/h (34 mph). By 15:00 UTC of the same day, the JTWC had upgraded the system to a tropical depression, assigning the numerical designation 16W. Three hours later, the JMA tracked that 16W had already strengthened into a tropical storm, giving 16W the name Pakhar. Around the same time, the PAGASA began issuing advisories under the local name Jolina. After it was depicted by satellite imagery that there was deep convection obscuring its low-level circulation center (LLCC), the JTWC had upgraded the system to a tropical storm.

By August 25, Pakhar slightly intensified after convective banding wrapping to its LLCC was depicted by satellite imagery. Pakhar was also located in a very favorable environment such as low wind shear along with warm sea-surface temperatures of 31 °C (88 °F). Pakhar slightly intensified after a burst of deep convection developed just prior of making landfall over in Luzon in the province of Aurora. However, due to land reaction from the archipelago and the inclusion of a weakened convective structure, Pakhar weakened to minimal tropical storm intensity.

After emerging to the South China Sea on August 26, Pakhar began to re-intensify as the storm entered in an area of a much lower amount of wind shear. However six hours later, Pakhar maintained its intensity after its LLCC became exposed and its deep convective banding became fragmented. By 18:00 UTC of the same day, the JMA upgraded Pakhar's intensity as a severe tropical storm, despite its central convection remaining disorganized. The PAGASA also stated that the storm had already exited their area of responsibility, issuing its final bulletin on Pakhar. By 00:00 UTC of August 27, Pakhar reached its maximum intensity of 100 km/h (62 mph) with a minimum barometric pressure of 985 hPa while making landfall over in South China in the city of Taishan. The JTWC assessed Pakhar's maximum intensity slightly higher with winds of 110 km/h (68 mph), however. Three hours later, the JTWC issued their final advisory. By 06:00 UTC, Pakhar began to rapidly weaken as the JMA downgraded Pakhar to a tropical storm. The JMA tracked the system until 18:00 UTC of the same day when it fully dissipated.

== Preparations and impact ==
=== Philippines ===
A satellite animation of Tropical Storm Pakhar making landfall on August 25

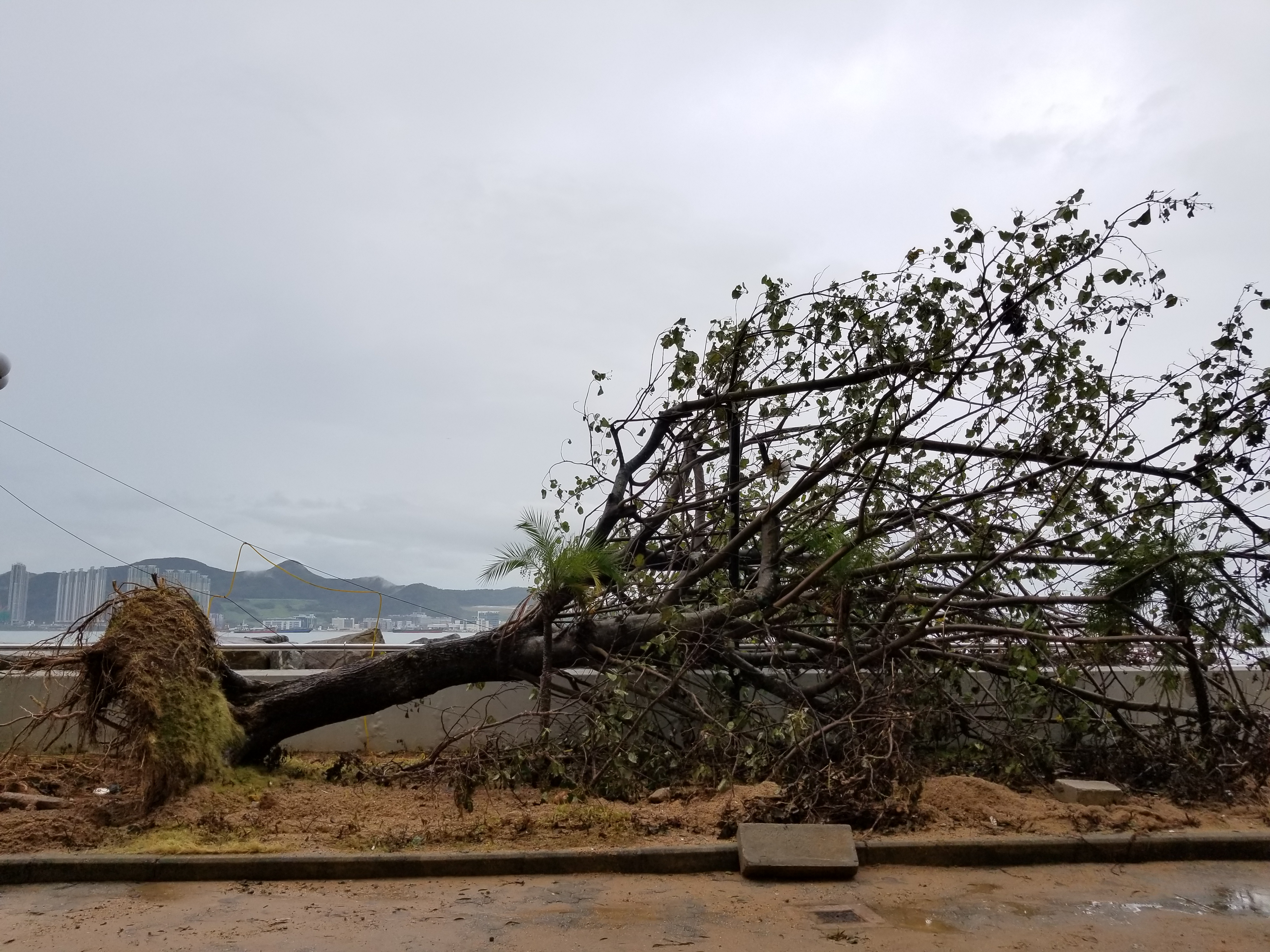
A tree which collapsed because of Pakhar.

Pakhar was locally named as Jolina within the country by PAGASA. As soon as PAGASA began issuing advisories on the storm, Tropical Cyclone Warning Signal #1 was raised over most of Cagayan Valley and northern Aurora during August 24. Tropical Cyclone Warning Signal #2 was also raised in the same areas with the inclusion of the Cordillera Administrative Region while Signal #1 was extended to the Ilocos Region and Bicol Region. By August 25, a total of 16 provinces were placed in a warning as they were located within a 100 km (60 mi) radius of the storm. Classes were suspended for all levels over in Albay, Bicol due to possible threats of flooding and landslides on August 25. The government also announced the suspension of classes for August 26 over in Metro Manila and some parts of Central Luzon and Calabarzon. The province of Ilocos Sur declared the suspension of work in all public and private services that same day.

The Office of the Civil Defense warned residents of low-lying areas in the provinces of Cagayan and Isabela of potential flooding. Kennon Road in Benguet were closed due to the threat of landslides. Hiking, trekking, and caving were suspended over in mountainous areas in the Mountain Province. Heavy rainfall from Pakhar caused the Magat Dam to overflow, which also submerged several bridges over in Isabela. A total of 11 flights to Hong Kong and South China from Ninoy Aquino International Airport were canceled due to the storm. Eight domestic flights were canceled throughout August 25.

According to the National Disaster Risk Reduction and Management Council, 3,397 people were affected by the storm with 17 evacuation centers used. The town of Balatan, the city of San Fernando, and the province of Ifugao suffered power outages throughout the storm. Overall, no casualties were reported and damages were relatively minor. Recorded damages in Aurora province reached PH₱41.27 million (US$808 thousand).

=== Hong Kong, Macau and South China ===
Still recovering from the aftermath of Typhoon Hato which impacted the area four days earlier, the Macao Meteorological and Geophysical Bureau issued a Tropical Cyclone Signal No. 8 for Macau late on August 26, as the storm approached. An orange typhoon warning was also raised over in the cities of Shenzhen and Guangzhou while red warning was raised in Zhuhai. A total of 206 flights were cancelled and another 471 delayed while 44 flights had to divert, including roughly 300 flights in total in Hong Kong being either cancelled or delayed, with 30 others diverted. There were 13 reports of flooding and 159 fallen trees over in Hong Kong. Two people were stranded in Kowloon Peak and moreover, the Government Flying Service deployed a Challenger 604 fixed-wing plane to locate 11 crew members waiting in the control room of a sinking Hong Tai 176 vessel.

While making landfall, Pakhar brought winds of about 90 km/h (56 mph) with gusts of up to 150 km/h (93 mph) over in Hong Kong. A total of 9,000 emergency repairers, 97 emergency generator vehicles and 1,691 generators are in place in Guangxi and the Yangtze River flood control headquarters dispatched personnel for the provinces of Sichuan and Yunnan.

Around 1:00 p.m local time, both the Macau and Hong Kong Observatory lowered their signal to a Tropical Cyclone Signal No. 3, but it wasn't until 10:10 p.m local time when all signals were down. The Home Affairs Department of Hong Kong opened 27 temporary shelters while the China Ferry Terminal in Tsim Sha Tsui was closed temporarily. Ferry services across the Pearl River Delta were also suspended. Part of the Stonecutters Bridge was closed due to strong winds which made vehicles taller than 1.5 metres and motorcycles barred from using the bridge. Moreover, 51 people sought medical treatment in public hospitals and 231 people have sought refuge in shelters.

Furthermore, Hainan had a total of 24,124 fishing boats put into harbor. All of the water bus service was paused in Guangzhou. The city of Taishan had recorded gusts of 119 km/h (74 mph). Pakhar drenched the Pearl River Delta region with the city of Shenzhen having total rainfall of 162 mm (6.4 in). The National Meteorological Center of China had forecast torrential rain over in the South China provinces from August 27–28, especially Guangdong and Guangxi could reach up to 1,800 mm (71 in) of rain. A total of 9,000 emergency repairers, 97 emergency generator vehicles and 1,691 generators are in place in Guangxi and the Yangtze River flood control headquarters dispatched personnel for the provinces of Sichuan and Yunnan.

A total of 83,000 people were affected by the storm, along with 14,000 people in which were evacuated over in the four main affected provinces of Guangdong, Guangxi, Guizhou and Yunnan. One person died from a traffic incident while 62 were injured, while an additional two were confirmed hours later. Overall, 12 people were killed by Pakhar, and damages reached CN¥760 million (US$114.4 million).

=== Elsewhere ===
The remnants of Pakhar caused heavy rainfall in Bắc Kạn Province, Vietnam, leaving an estimated 2 billion₫ (US$88,000) in damage. Pakhar also brought very heavy rainfall in some parts of Thailand despite it not having any direct impact. Due to the torrential rain, a major reservoir in Sakon Nakhon had to be discharged, leading to a flood watch being issued in the northern parts of the country on August 28. The Nam Pung Dam also carried about 170 million cubic meters of water, about 3% over its usual holding capacity.

== See also ==
- Weather of 2017
- Tropical cyclones in 2017
- Other systems named Pakhar
- Tropical Storm Soudelor (2009)
- Tropical Storm Linfa (2015)
- Tropical Storm Nida (2016)
- Typhoon Yagi (2024)
- Typhoon Tapah (2025)
