= Festival of Short Film =

- Festival of Short Film collage
- Status: Active
- Genre: film festival
- Date: May 6th – 8th 2016
- Frequency: Annually
- Venue: Various, across Lancashire
- Locations: Accrington, Lancashire
- Country: UK
- Website: https://festivalofshortfilm.salford.ac.uk

The Festival of Short Film is an annual festival started in 2006 focusing on independent filmmaking, offering local and national premieres, hosting masterclasses, workshops and discussions for filmmakers from the enthusiast to the professional. The Film Festival is an established exhibitor and all-round film education resource for the growing independent film movement in England's North West region.

== History ==
The Pennine film was founded initially as a local student film competition hosted at Accrington & Rossendale College In 2006; over the past decade the competition received a significant amount of entries, and consequently developing into a larger festival holding events outside the college campus. Between 2017 and 2025 the festival changed its name to Festival of Short Film.

== Format ==
The Festival of Short Films is held annually between March and May every year. It primarily takes place in Lancashire across various venues within the county. These include cinemas, outdoor public spaces, galleries and theatres, offering filmmakers an opportunity to see their films on a big screen and to network with other creatives.

== Previous Events ==
In previous years, the festival has offered events to complement a screening of a feature film, most commonly a Q&A with a filmmaker or an expert within the field of the films theme. Previous speakers include Get Carter director Mike Hodges. The Festival of Short Film also contributed to the Accrington Food & Drink Festival with an evening screening of the award-winning Sideways with a selection of wine and cheese tasting at The Ballroom at Accrington Town Hall. Previous participants also include directors Alex Cox, Chris Bernard, Phil Hawkins and actors Lee Ingleby and Margi Clarke.

== Call for Entries ==
The Festival of Short Films uses the FilmFreeway platform and is open for entries immediately after the end of the current running festival, welcoming film submissions from emerging and established filmmakers from around the world. Pennine accepts films with a maximum running time of 30 minutes awarding the best submitted film in various categories including: animation, documentary, narrative, local, horror and student.
