= Doc Society =

Documentary film non-profit organisation

- Type: Private, non-profit
- Headquarters: United Kingdom • United States • Netherlands
- Region served: Global
- Official language: English
- Directors: Sandra Whipham, Megha Agrawal Sood, Shanida Scotland, Maxyne Franklin, Beadie Finzi
- Website: https://docsociety.org/

Doc Society (formerly the Channel 4 BRITDOC Foundation and later the BRITDOC Foundation) is a private, non‑profit organization that funds, supports and amplifies independent documentary filmmakers and public‑interest media worldwide.

== History ==
Doc Society was founded in 2005 in the United Kingdom by Jess Search, Maxyne Franklin, Katie Bradford and Beadie Finzi. with initial backing from Channel 4 to support British documentaries that fell outside conventional broadcast commissions.

- 2005–2009 – Operated as the Channel 4 BRITDOC Foundation.
- 2009–2017 – Renamed the BRITDOC Foundation.

Since its inception, the organisation has grown into a federated network of legal entities in the UK, US, the Netherlands and Australia, with staff and partners across Europe, Africa, Asia, Oceania and the Americas. Governance follows a shared‑leadership model: five co‑directors jointly oversee legal, financial and strategic matters.

== Core Programs ==
Climate Story Unit (CSU).

Democracy Story Unit (DSU)

BFI Doc Society Fund (UK)

=== Ecosystem‑Building & Networks ===
- Developing free resources – Impact Field Guide (8 languages, 100 k users); Safe + Secure guide (AI‑era updates).
- Strengthening Community networks – Good Pitch (59 editions, > 5 500 partner organisations, US $33 M new funding); Global Impact Producers Alliance (GIPA); DISCO network; Climate Storytellers Network + Climate Reframe network.

belongs on docsociety website

== Legal Dispute (2019) ==
In 2019 Doc Society filed Doc Society v. Blinken, challenging U.S. export‑control regulations that threatened the ability of international documentary filmmakers to receive U.S. equipment and software. The case was covered by major outlets and analyzed by civil‑rights think‑tanks.
