= Xiachuan Island =

Island of the South China Sea on the southern coast of China

Coordinates: 21°39′N 112°36′E

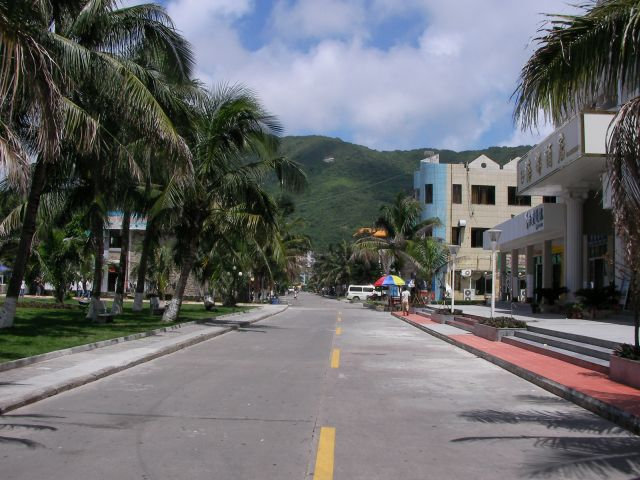
Main street of Xiachuan Tourist Zone

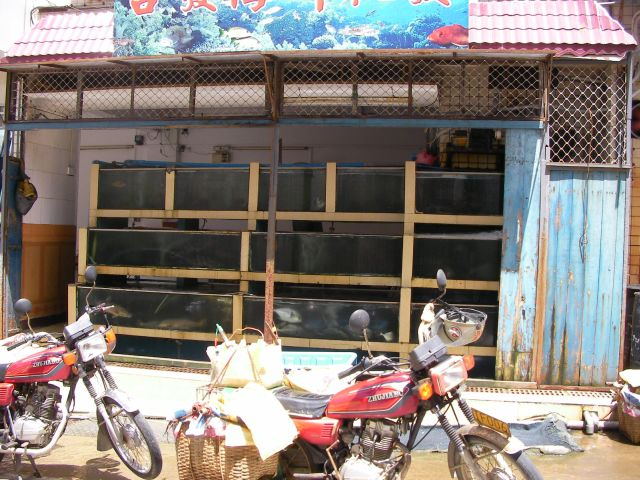
Live seafood in seafood restaurant

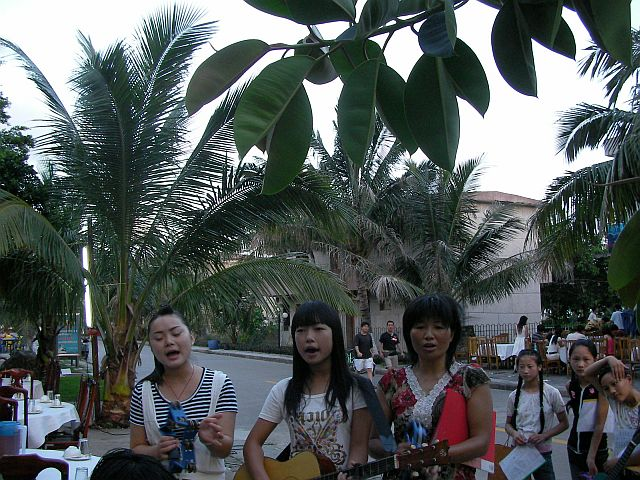
Street musicians

Xiachuan Island (Chinese: 下川岛; pinyin: Xiàchuāndǎo) (Hsiachwan Shan) is an island of the South China Sea, on the southern coast of China, part of the Guangdong province.

== Administration ==
Administratively, Chuandao (川岛镇) is one of the 16 towns of Taishan.

== Geography ==
The island is located near the larger Shangchuan Island, which lies East of Xiachuan.

== Economy ==
Shangchuan and Xiachuan have been established as a Tourism Open Integrated Experimental Zones (旅游开发综合试验区; lǚyóu kāifā zōnghé shìyàn qū).

== Transportation ==
Xiachuan Island is linked from the mainland by Shanzui Harbor ferry. There is also ferry service between Xiachuan and its sister island Shangchuan Island.

== See also ==
- Chuanshan Archipelago
- Geography of China
- List of islands of the People's Republic of China
- List of islands in the South China Sea
