= Chuanshan Archipelago =

Group of islands in the South China Sea, off the coast of Guangdong Province, China

Chuandao 川岛镇
- Town
- Locator map for the Chuanshan Archipelago
- Country: China
- Province: Guangdong
- City: Jiangmen
- District: Taishan City
- Town seat: Daguanghai Bay Economic Zone (大廣海灣經濟區) on the mainland

Area
  - Total: 254.3 km^{2} (98.2 sq mi)

Population
  - Total: 28,272
  - Density: 111.2/km^{2} (287.9/sq mi)
- Time zone: UTC+8 (China Standard)

Chuanshan Archipelago
- Simplified Chinese: 川山群岛
- Traditional Chinese: 川山羣島 or 川山群島
- Literal meaning: Flow Islands Archipelago (Note: 山 (Shan) literally means hills and mountains. Before the emerging of Modern China, 山 also refers to islands.)
Transcriptions
Standard Mandarin
- Hanyu Pinyin: Chuānshān Qúndǎo
Yue: Cantonese
- Yale Romanization: chyūn sāan kwàhn dóu
- Jyutping: cyun1 saan1 kwan4 dou2

The Chuanshan Archipelago (川山群岛) is a group of islands in the South China Sea, just off the coast of Guangdong Province of southern China, rather nearer to the Pearl River Delta than to the Leizhou Peninsula.

== Administration ==
Administratively the group falls wholly within the County-level city of Taishan (台山), in the municipal region of Jiangmen, Guangdong. The two large islands, Shangchuan (上川) and Xiachuan (下川), and all the other islands, islets, outcroppings and reefs in the archipelago lie within the jurisdiction of Chuandao, one of Taishan's sixteen "towns" (镇, zhen). Chuandao's town seat, however, is located on the mainland in Shanjudahaicun.
