= 2005 Pacific hurricane season =

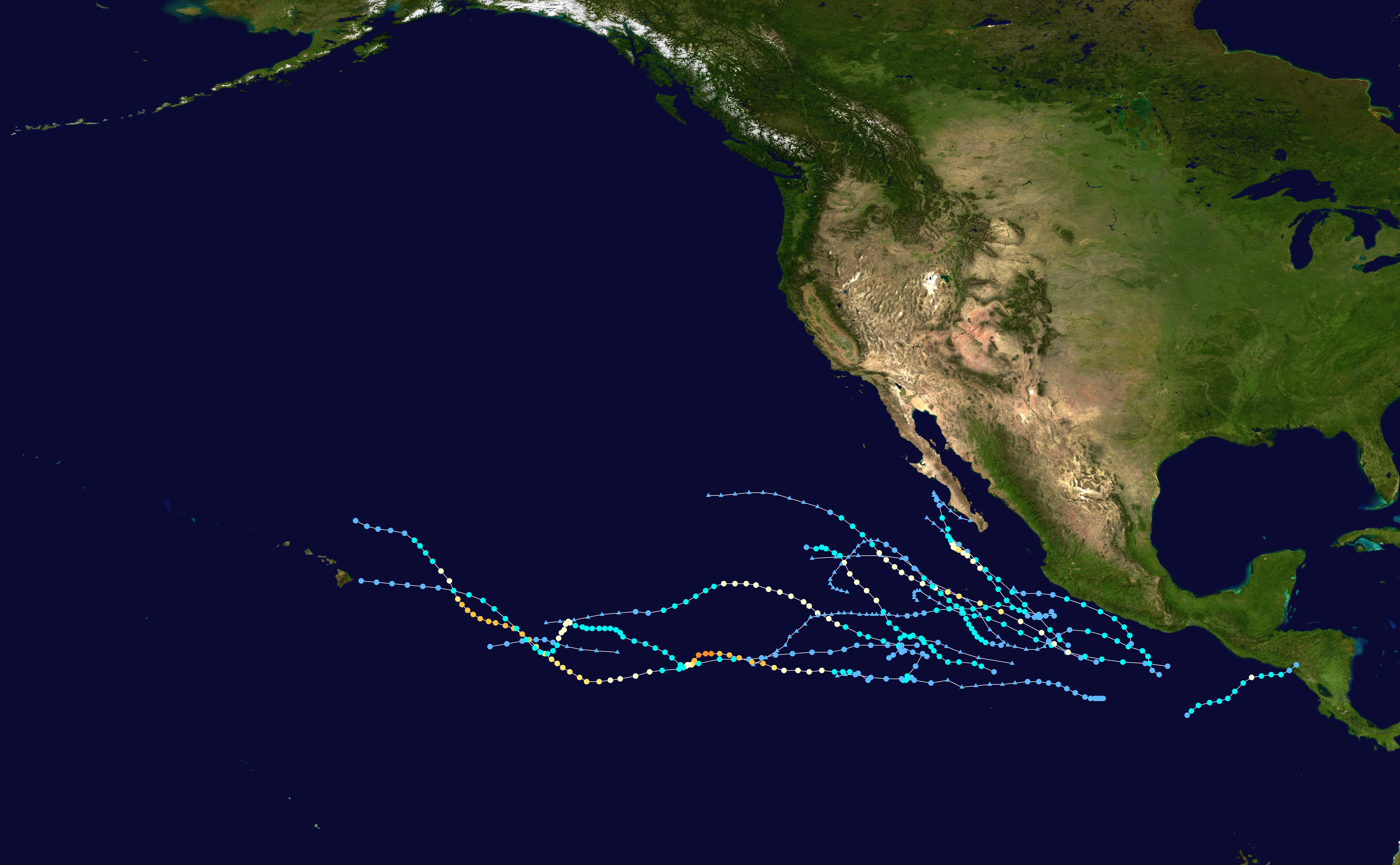
- Season summary map

Seasonal boundaries
- First system formed: May 17, 2005
- Last system dissipated: October 20, 2005

Strongest storm
- Name: Kenneth
  - Maximum winds: 130 mph (215 km/h) (1-minute sustained)
  - Lowest pressure: 947 mbar (hPa; 27.97 inHg)

Seasonal statistics
- Total depressions: 17
- Total storms: 15
- Hurricanes: 7
- Major hurricanes (Cat. 3+): 2
- ACE: 96.8675 units
- Total fatalities: 6 total
- Total damage: $12 million (2005 USD)

Related articles
- Timeline of the 2005 Pacific hurricane season; 2005 Atlantic hurricane season; 2005 Pacific typhoon season; 2005 North Indian Ocean cyclone season

The 2005 Pacific hurricane season was a near-average Pacific hurricane season which produced fifteen named storms, seven hurricanes and two major hurricanes. It was also the second consecutive season in which no tropical cyclone of at least tropical storm intensity made landfall. The season officially began on May 15 in the East Pacific Ocean, and on June 1 in the Central Pacific; they ended on November 30. These dates conventionally delimit the period of each year when most tropical cyclones form in the Pacific basin. However, the formation of tropical cyclones is possible at any time of the year.

Activity began with the formation of Hurricane Adrian, the fourth-earliest-forming tropical storm on record in the basin at the time. Adrian led to flash flooding and several landslides across Central America, resulting in five deaths and $12 million (2005 USD) in damage. Tropical storms Calvin and Dora caused minor damage along the coastline, while Tropical Storm Eugene led to one death in Acapulco. In early October, Otis produced tropical storm-force winds and minor flooding across the Baja California peninsula. The remnants of Tropical Depression One-C in the central Pacific, meanwhile, caused minor impacts in Hawaii. The strongest storm of the season was Hurricane Kenneth, which attained peak winds of 130 mph (210 km/h) over the open Pacific.

== Pre-season forecasts ==
Predictions of tropical activity in the 2005 season
Source	Date	Named storms	Hurricanes	Major hurricanes	Ref
Eastern	Average	15–16	9	4–5
SMN	February 2005	17	10	7
NOAA	May 16, 2005	11–15	6–8	2–4
Eastern	Actual activity	15	7	2
Central	Average	4–5	1	–
NOAA	May 16, 2005	2–3	–	–
Central	Actual activity	2	2	1

The first forecast for the 2005 season was produced by the Servicio Meteorológico Nacional (SMN) in the second month of the year. In their report, the organization cited a list of analog years – 1952, 1957, 1985, 1991, and 1993 – with similar oceanic and atmospheric patterns. An overall total of 17 tropical storms, 10 hurricanes, and 7 major hurricanes was forecast, above the average. The National Oceanic and Atmospheric Administration (NOAA), meanwhile, released their seasonal outlook on May 16, predicting 11 to 15 named storms, 6 to 8 hurricanes, and 2 to 4 major hurricanes. The organization noted that when the Atlantic basin was busier than average, as expected in 2005, the eastern Pacific generally saw lesser activity. That same day, NOAA issued a forecast for activity across the central Pacific, expecting 2 to 3 tropical cyclones to occur across the basin. A normal season averaged 4 to 5 tropical cyclones, including 1 hurricane. A near-normal El Niño–Southern Oscillation existed across the equatorial Pacific throughout 2005, which indicated conditions generally less conducive for activity there.

== Seasonal summary ==
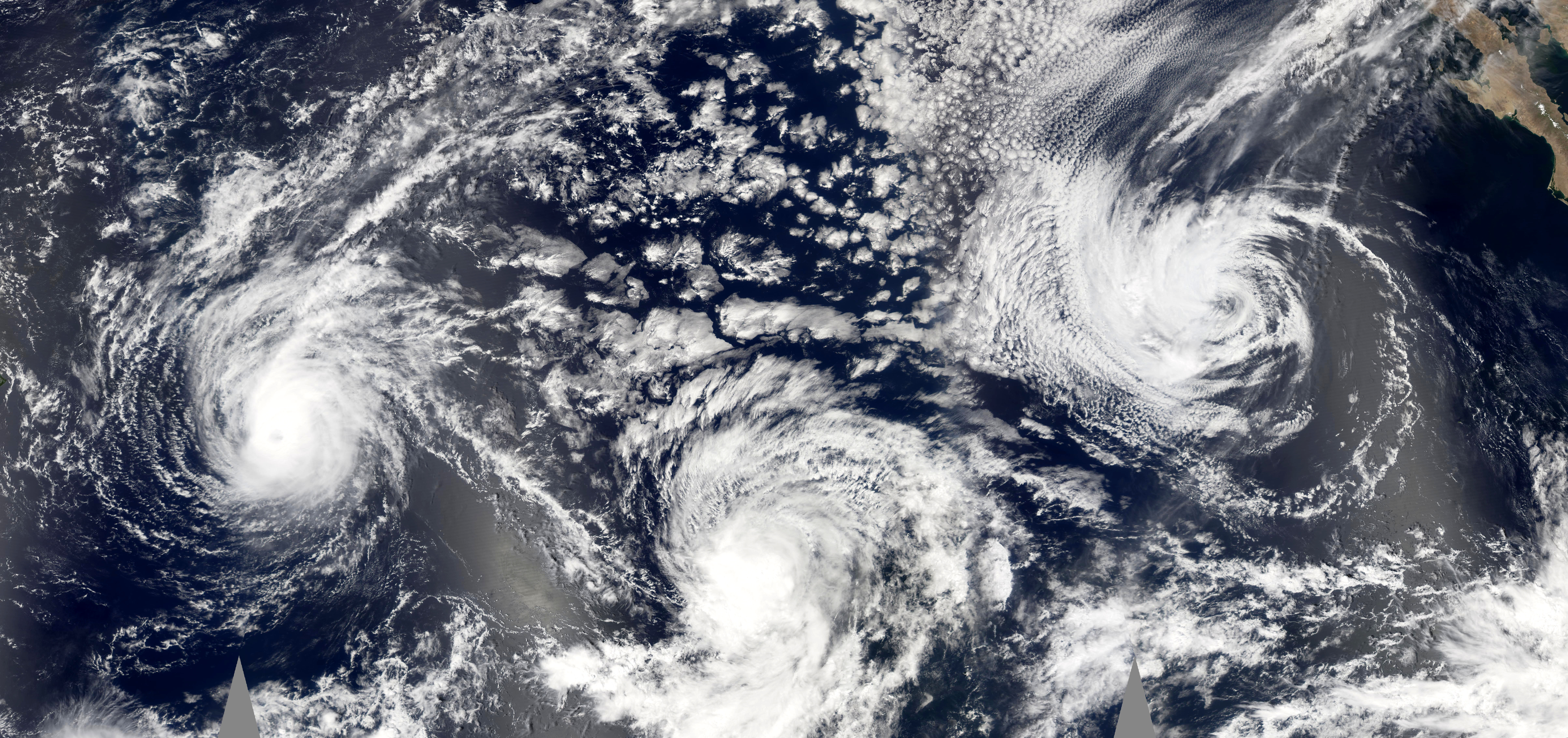
Three simultaneous tropical cyclones existed on September 22. Jova, Kenneth and Max

The Accumulated Cyclone Energy (ACE) index for the 2005 Pacific hurricane season as calculated by Colorado State University using data from the National Hurricane Center was 96.6 units. (Note: The total represents the sum of the squares of the maximum sustained wind speed (knots) for every (sub)tropical storm's intensity of over 33 knots (38 mph; 61 km/h), divided by 10,000 while they are above that threshold; therefore, tropical depressions are not included.) Broadly speaking, ACE is a measure of the power of a tropical or subtropical storm multiplied by the length of time it existed. It is only calculated for full advisories on specific tropical and subtropical systems reaching or exceeding wind speeds of 39 mph (63 km/h).

The season's first tropical cyclone, Adrian, developed on May 17 and reached its peak as a Category 1 hurricane. Named storms are infrequent in May, with one tropical storm every two years and a hurricane once every four years. At the time, Adrian was the fourth earliest tropical cyclone to form in the eastern Pacific since reliable record-keeping began in 1971. Activity throughout the remainder of the season was far less notable, with 16 tropical cyclones, 15 named storms, 7 hurricanes, and 2 major hurricanes. The long-term 1971–2004 average suggests an average season to feature 15 named storms, 9 hurricanes, and 4 major hurricanes. October in particular was notably quiet, with the formation of only one tropical depression; only three other seasons, 1989, 1995, and 1996, ended the month without the designation of a named storm.

Analysis of the environment suggested that most storms formed during the passage of the positive Madden–Julian oscillation and its associated upper-air divergence, which is favorable for tropical cyclone formation. Extended reprieves in tropical activity were connected to upper-level convergence. Another factor that led to a below-average season was the presence of cooler than average ocean temperatures during the peak months, helping to extend the period of lesser activity that began throughout the eastern Pacific around 1995.

== Systems ==
=== Hurricane Adrian ===
- Category 1 hurricane (SSHWS)
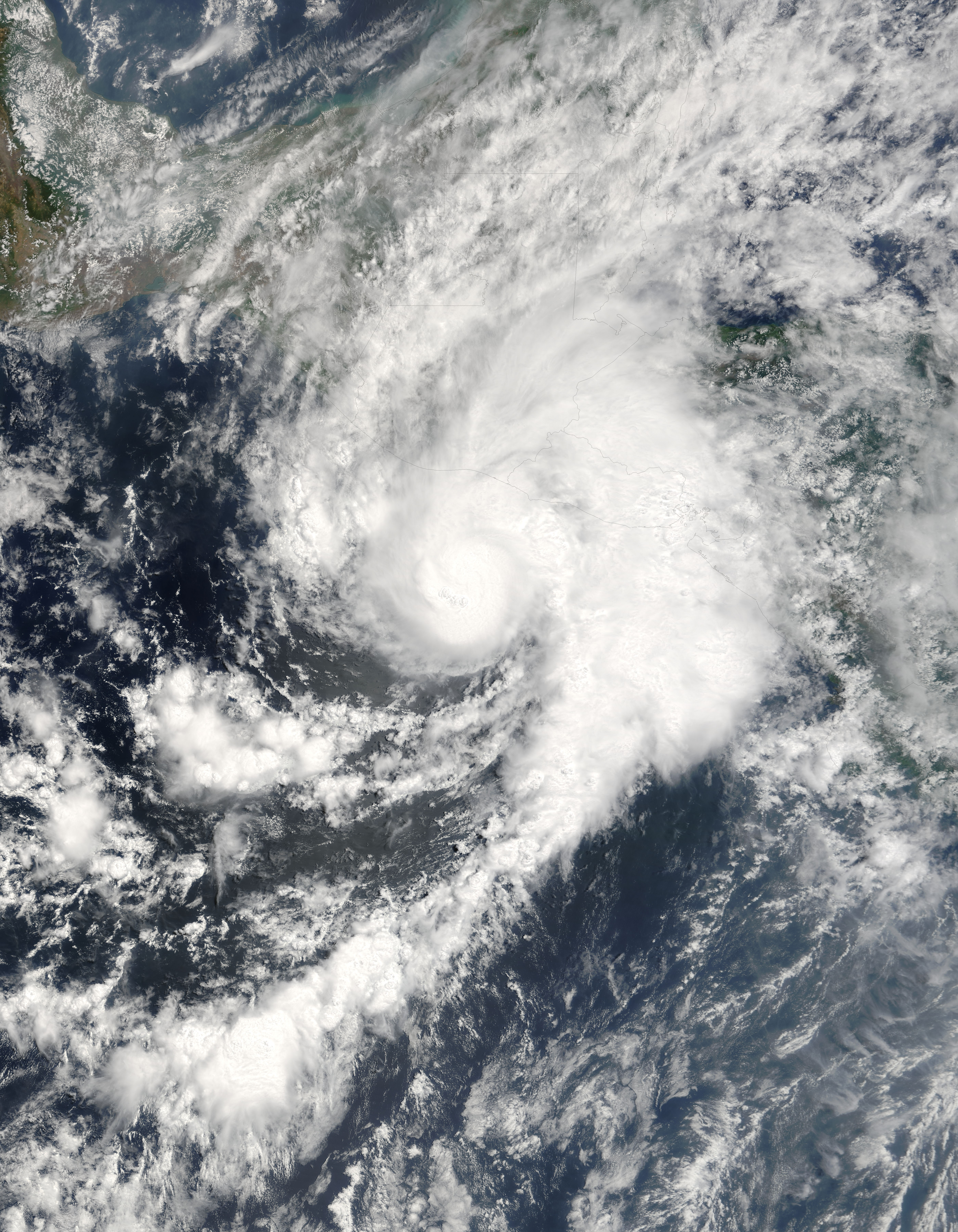
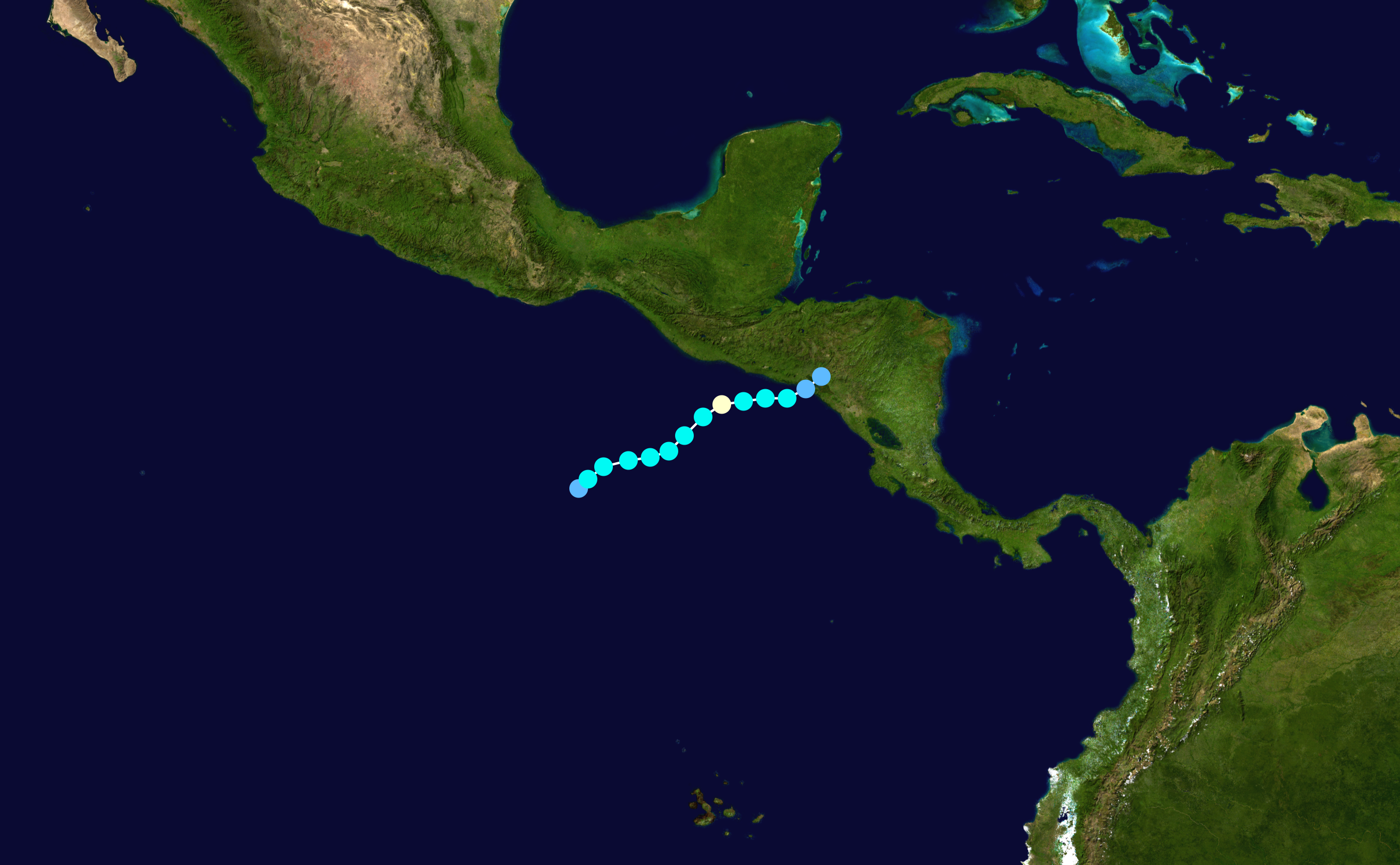
- Duration: May 17 – May 21
- Peak intensity: 80 mph (130 km/h) (1-min); 982 mbar (hPa)

In early to mid-May, several areas of disturbed weather moving westward from Central America aided in the formation of a broad area of low pressure well south of Mexico. A poorly defined tropical wave became intertwined with the larger system over subsequent days, leading to the formation of a tropical depression at 18:00 UTC on May 17. The nascent cyclone intensified into Tropical Storm Adrian six hours later. Despite the effects of moderate wind shear, the system steadily organized as convection became concentrated around the center, and Adrian attained its peak with winds of 80 mph (130 km/h) at 18:00 UTC on May 19. Environmental conditions became less conducive thereafter as downsloping from mountains along the coastline of Mexico combined with the already-marginal upper-level winds. The cyclone fell to tropical storm intensity at 00:00 UTC on May 20, tropical depression intensity at 18:00 UTC that day, and dissipated at 06:00 UTC on May 21 along the coastline of Honduras in the Gulf of Fonseca.

Hurricane Adrian was responsible for five deaths: two died in a mudslide in Guatemala, a pilot crashed in high winds and a person drowned in El Salvador, and a person was killed by flooding in Nicaragua. Heavy rainfall up to 16.4 in (420 mm) in El Salvador led to landslides, damaged roads, and flash flooding. In Honduras, a few shacks were destroyed, a few roads were blocked, and some flooding occurred; similar effects were noted in Guatemala and Nicaragua. Monetary losses topped $12 million (2005 USD) in El Salvador alone.

=== Tropical Storm Beatriz ===
- Tropical storm (SSHWS)
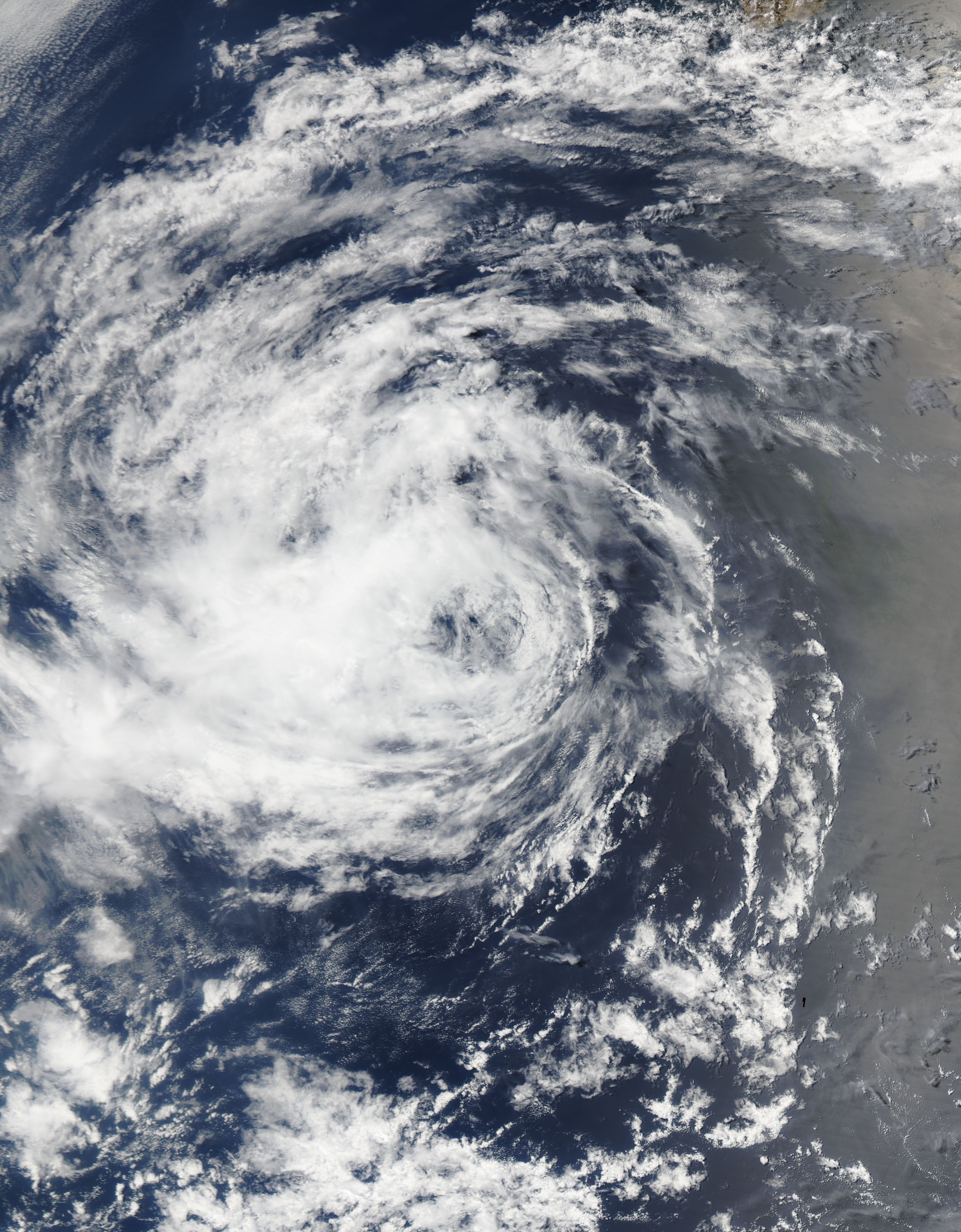
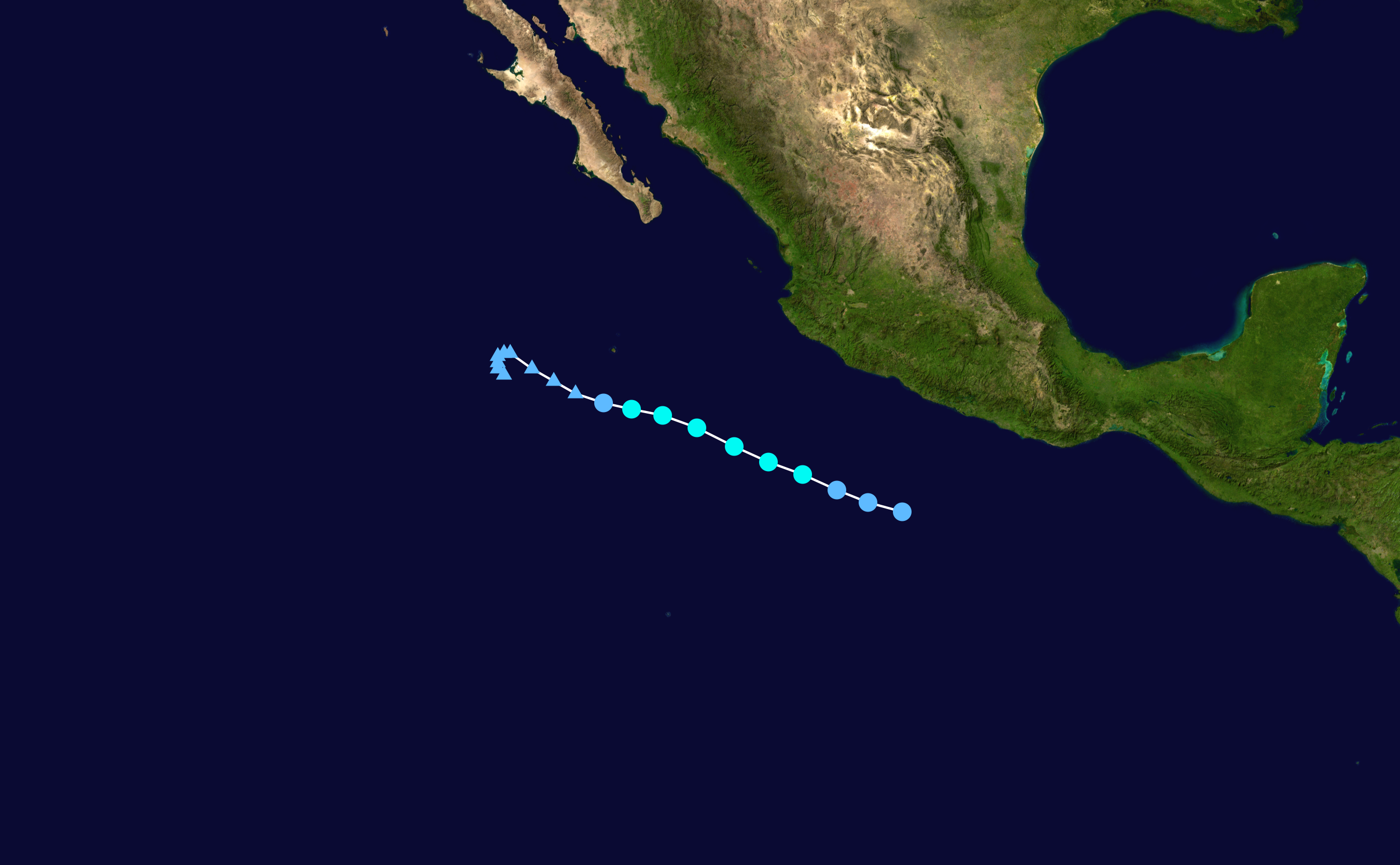
- Duration: June 21 – June 24
- Peak intensity: 50 mph (85 km/h) (1-min); 1000 mbar (hPa)

A tropical wave emerged into the Atlantic on June 8 and entered the East Pacific over a week later, merging with a number of disturbances within a broad area of low pressure south of Mexico on June 17. The disturbance's cloud pattern—although initially elongated—steadily coalesced, leading to the formation of a tropical depression at 18:00 UTC on June 21 and further intensification into Tropical Storm Beatriz at 12:00 UTC on June 22. The system battled easterly wind shear and marginal ocean temperatures on its west-northwest track, attaining peak winds of 50 mph (80 km/h) the next day before weakening to tropical depression intensity at 00:00 UTC on June 24. Six hours later, it degenerated into a remnant low which slowed and turned southward prior to dissipating early on June 26.

=== Tropical Storm Calvin ===
- Tropical storm (SSHWS)
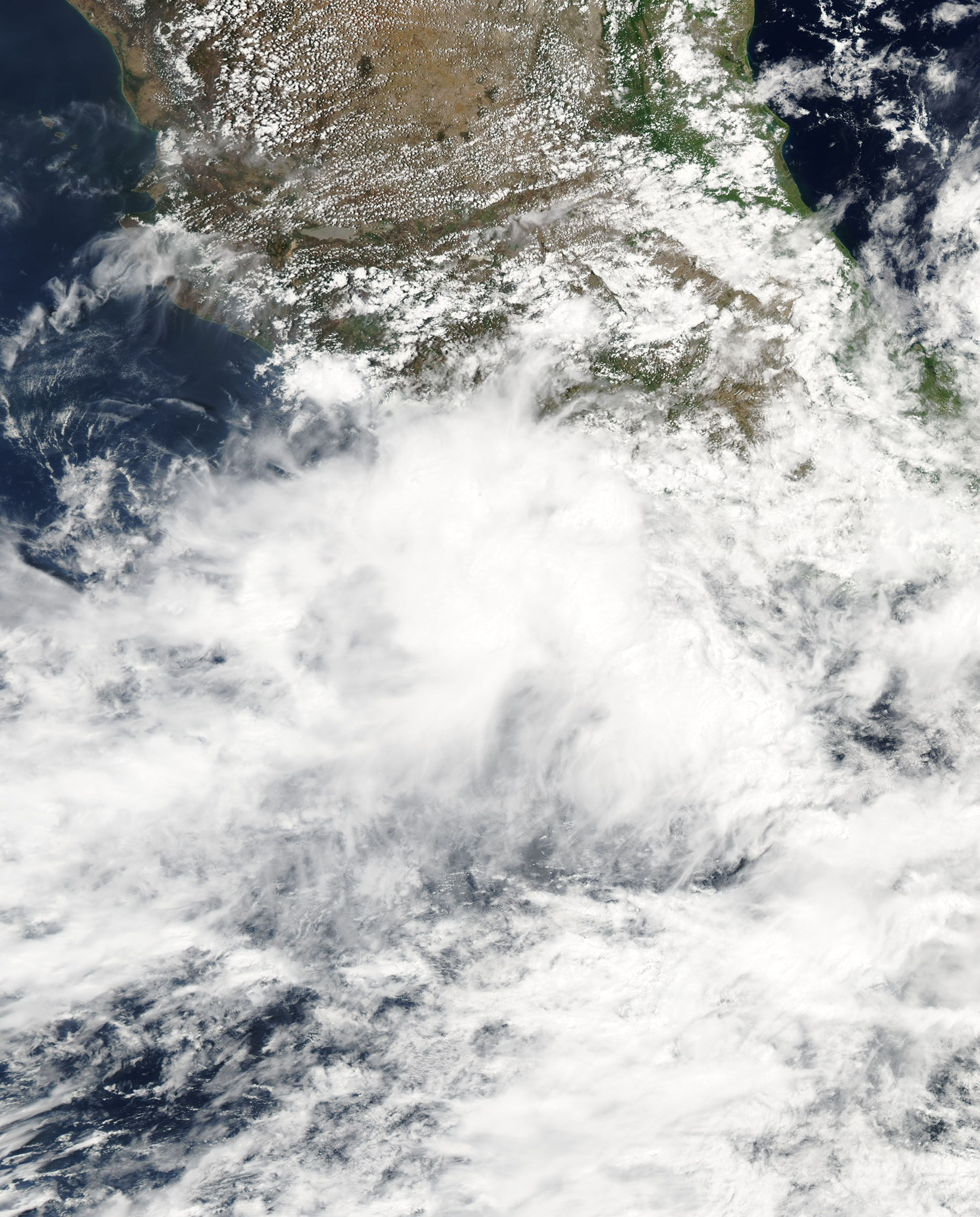
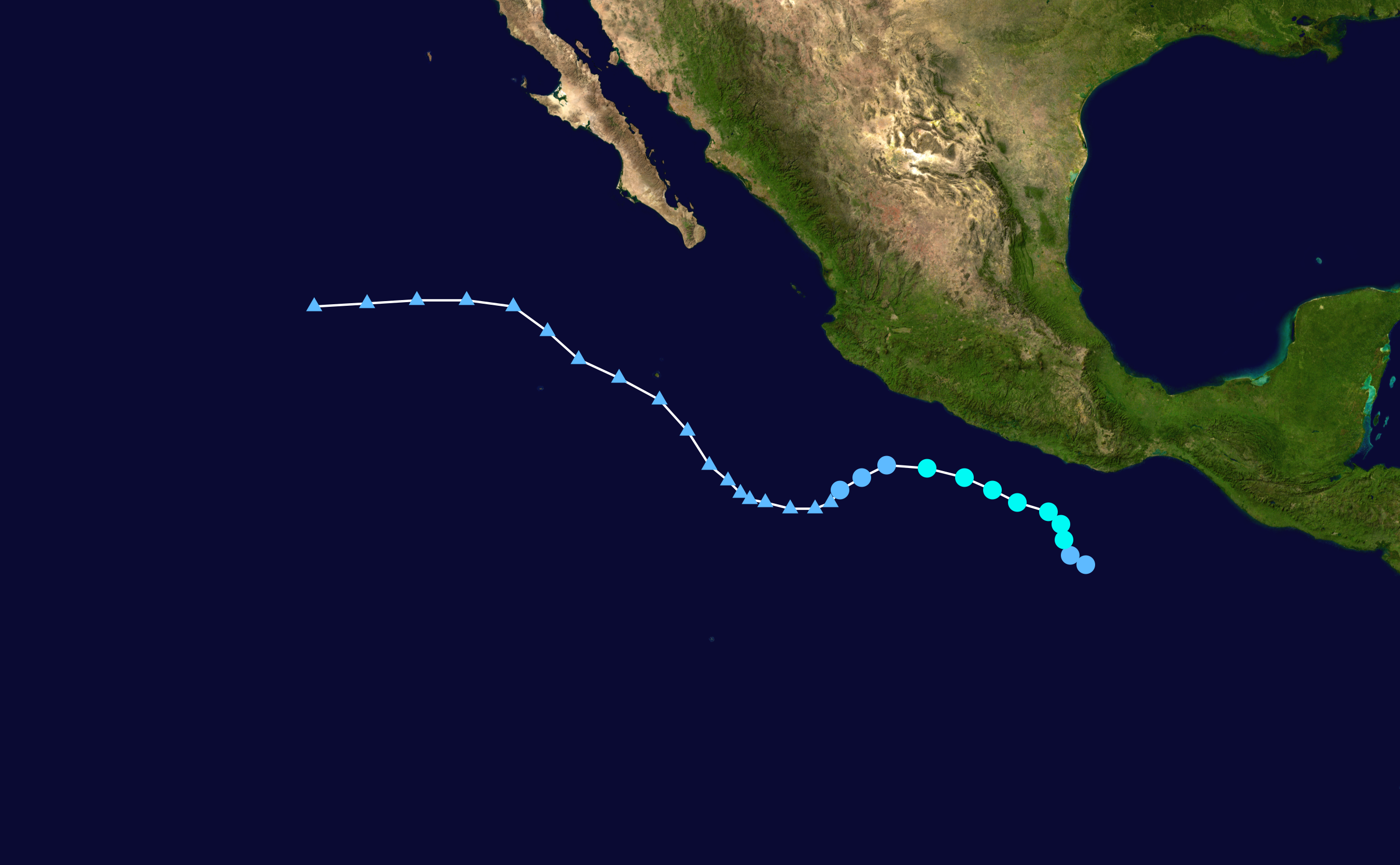
- Duration: June 26 – June 29
- Peak intensity: 50 mph (85 km/h) (1-min); 1000 mbar (hPa)

A tropical wave emerged off the western coast of Africa on June 11, remaining inconspicuous until reaching the southwestern Caribbean Sea eight days later. The system entered the eastern Pacific on June 21, where steady organization led to the formation of a tropical depression around 06:00 UTC on June 26 while located 330 mi (530 km) south-southeast of Acapulco, Mexico. Upon formation, the cyclone moved north-northwest and then west-northwest under the dictation of a subtropical ridge to its north. It intensified into Tropical Storm Calvin at 18:00 UTC on June 26, attaining a peak intensity of 50 mph (80 km/h) early the next morning in conjunction with a well-defined spiral band on radar. Calvin then dove west-southwest and weakened as strong wind shear exposed the storm's circulation; it fell to tropical depression status at 12:00 UTC on June 28 and further degenerated to a remnant low by 06:00 UTC the next day. The low moved generally westward before dissipating well southwest of the Baja California peninsula on July 3. As a tropical cyclone, Calvin caused only minor damage to roofs and highways, flooded a house, and toppled two trees.

=== Tropical Storm Dora ===
- Tropical storm (SSHWS)
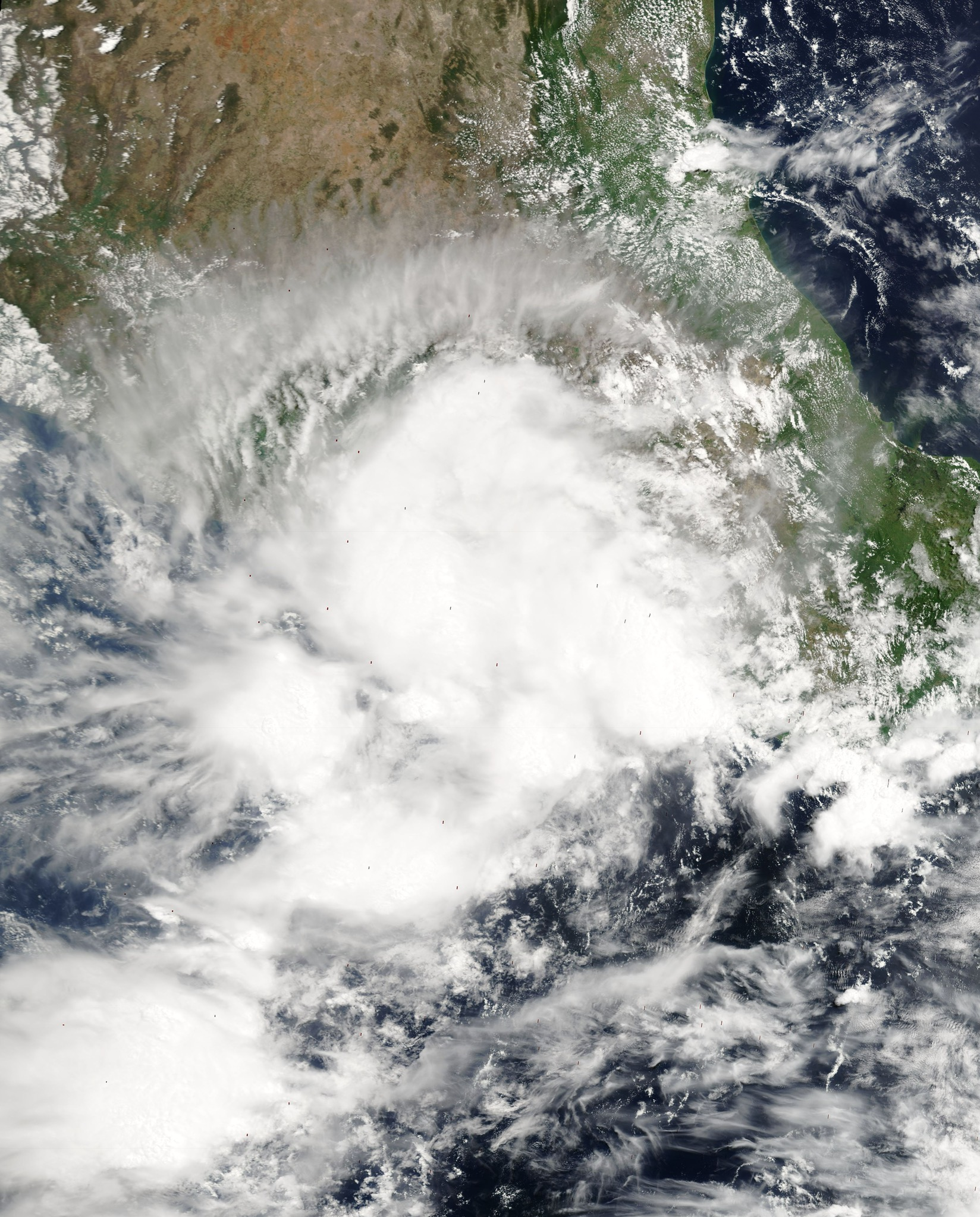
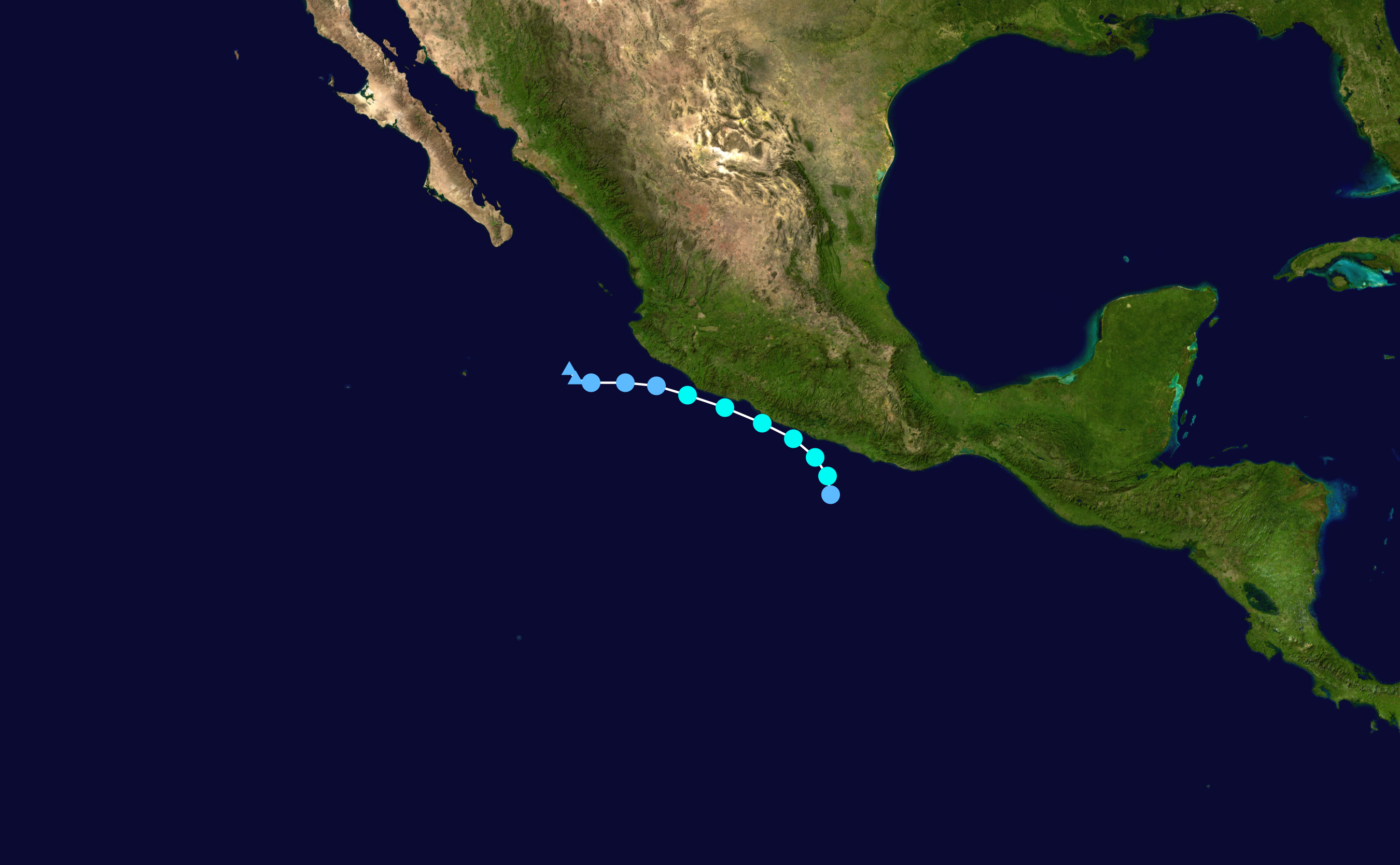
- Duration: July 4 – July 6
- Peak intensity: 45 mph (75 km/h) (1-min); 1002 mbar (hPa)

The genesis of Tropical Storm Dora can be attributed to a westward-moving tropical wave that emerged off Africa on June 18. By July 3, the wave passed through the Gulf of Tehuantepec, where broad cyclonic flow began to develop along its axis. Following further organization, the disturbance intensified into a tropical depression by 00:00 UTC on July 4 and further strengthened into Tropical Storm Dora six hours later. The cyclone moved north-northwest and then west-northwest, paralleling the coastline of Mexico under the influence of a subtropical ridge, where landslides and mudslides cut communication to 12 mountain villages. Under a moderate easterly wind shear regime, Dora ultimately changed little in strength, peaking with winds of 45 mph (72 km/h) as the center became obscured on the eastern edge of extremely deep convection. A track over colder waters caused the storm to fall to tropical depression intensity late on July 5 and degenerate into a remnant low by 12:00 UTC on July 6. The low then dissipated six hours later.

=== Tropical Storm Eugene ===
- Tropical storm (SSHWS)
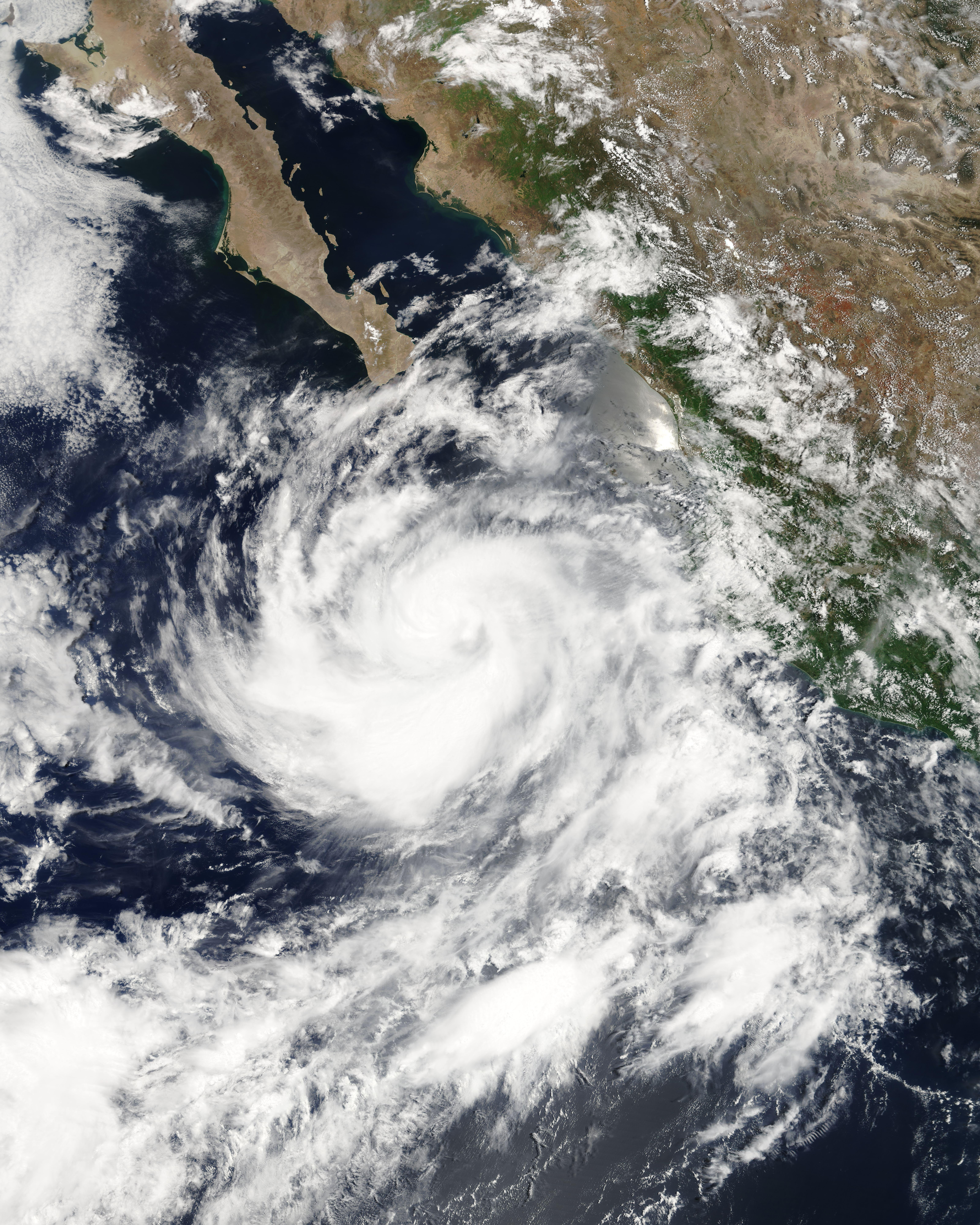
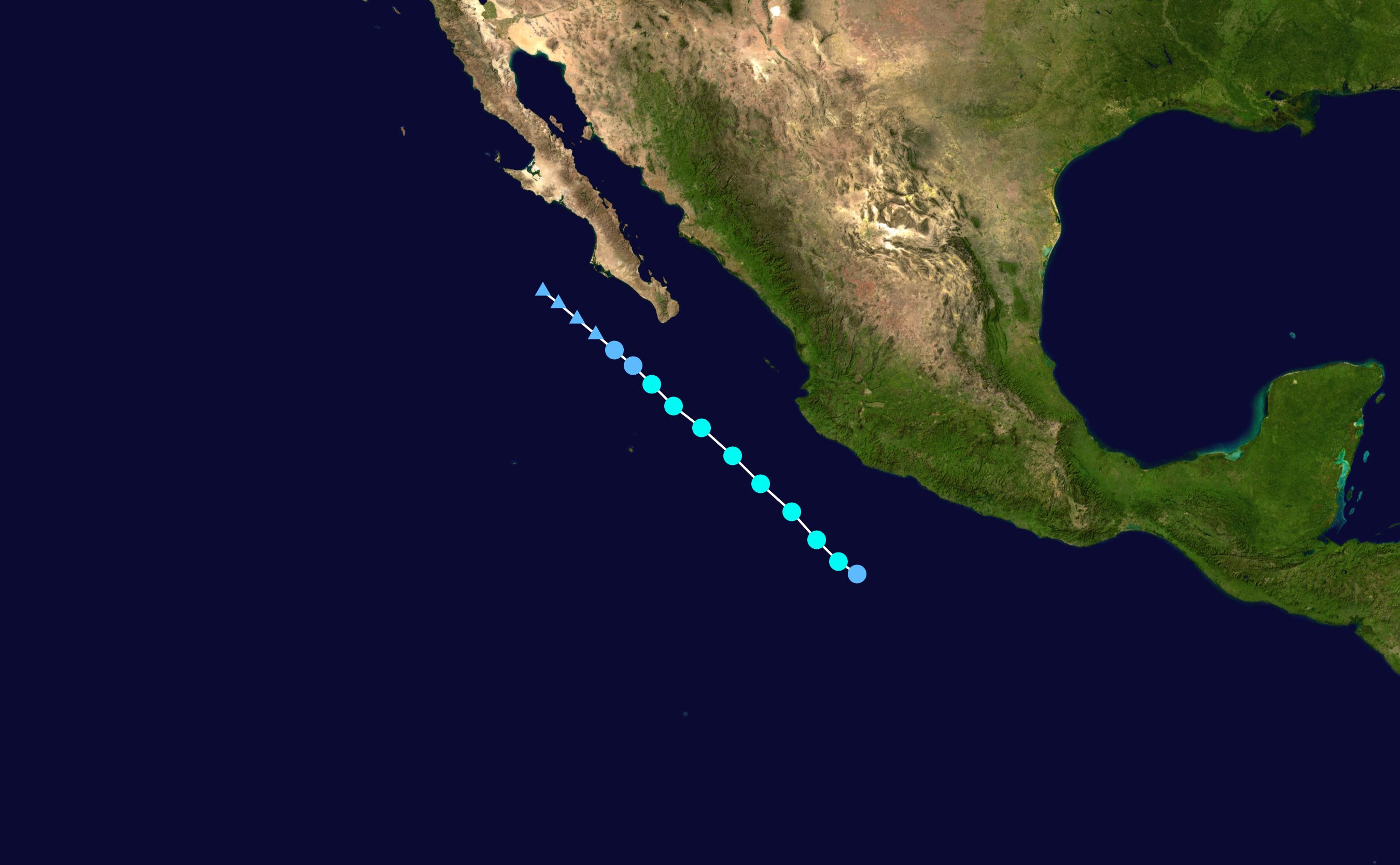
- Duration: July 18 – July 20
- Peak intensity: 70 mph (110 km/h) (1-min); 989 mbar (hPa)

A tropical wave first identified over the Caribbean Sea on July 10 entered the eastern Pacific four days later. The disturbance organized as banding features became distinct, leading to the formation of a tropical depression by 06:00 UTC on July 18. The cyclone intensified into Tropical Storm Eugene six hours later as a mid-level ridge steered it generally northwest. Amid an environment of light wind shear, Eugene steadily organized to reach peak winds of 70 mph (110 km/h) by late on July 19, although it is possible the storm briefly attained hurricane intensity. Already tracking over cooler waters, Eugene quickly weakened immediately after its peak, becoming a tropical depression by 12:00 UTC on July 20 and degenerating into a remnant low twelve hours later. The low continued northwest before losing its character on July 22. As a tropical cyclone, Eugene flooded streets (which displaced six vehicles), left at least 30 houses inundated, and caused one death after a man's boat overturned.

=== Tropical Depression One-C ===
- Tropical depression (SSHWS)
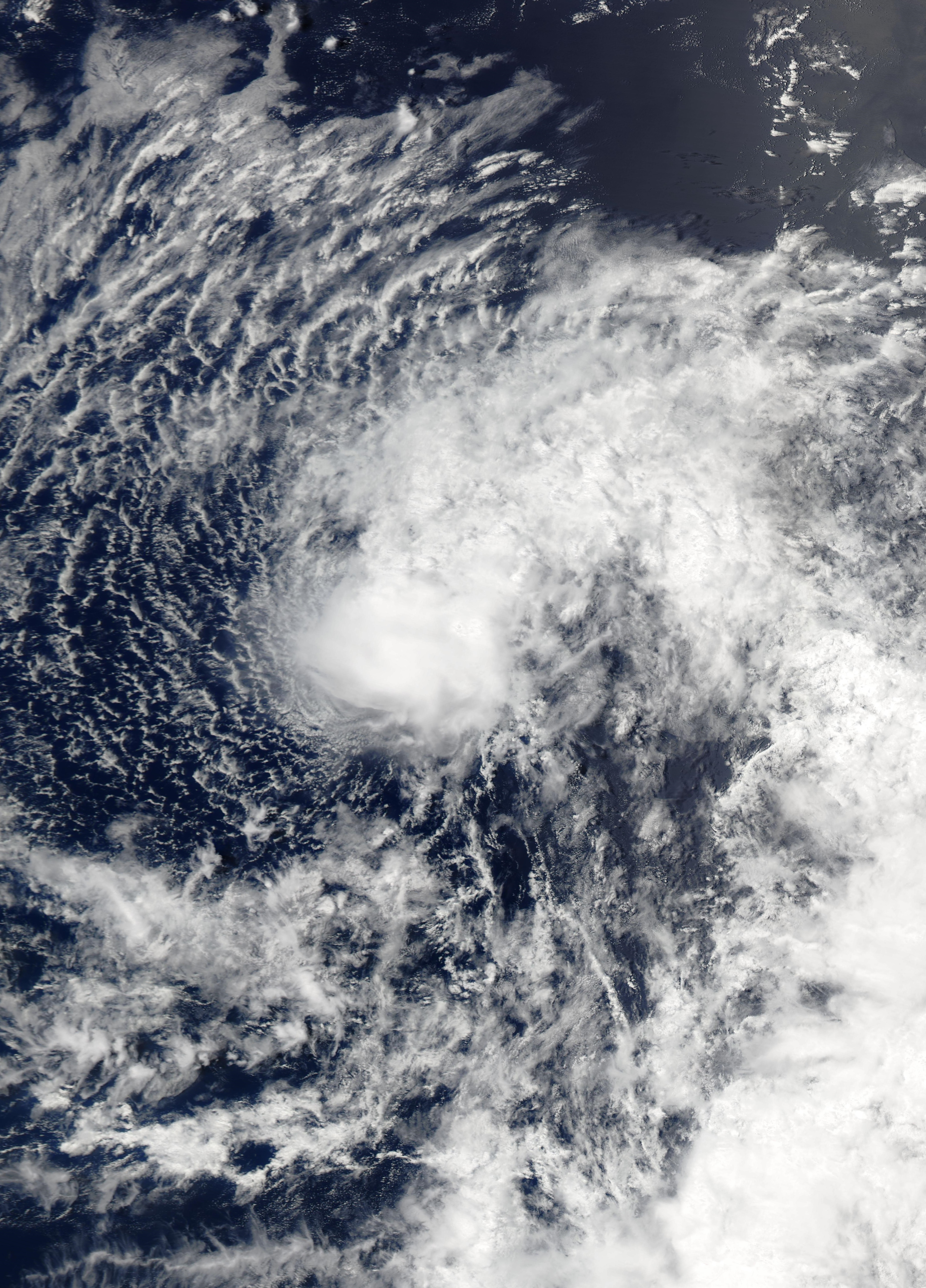
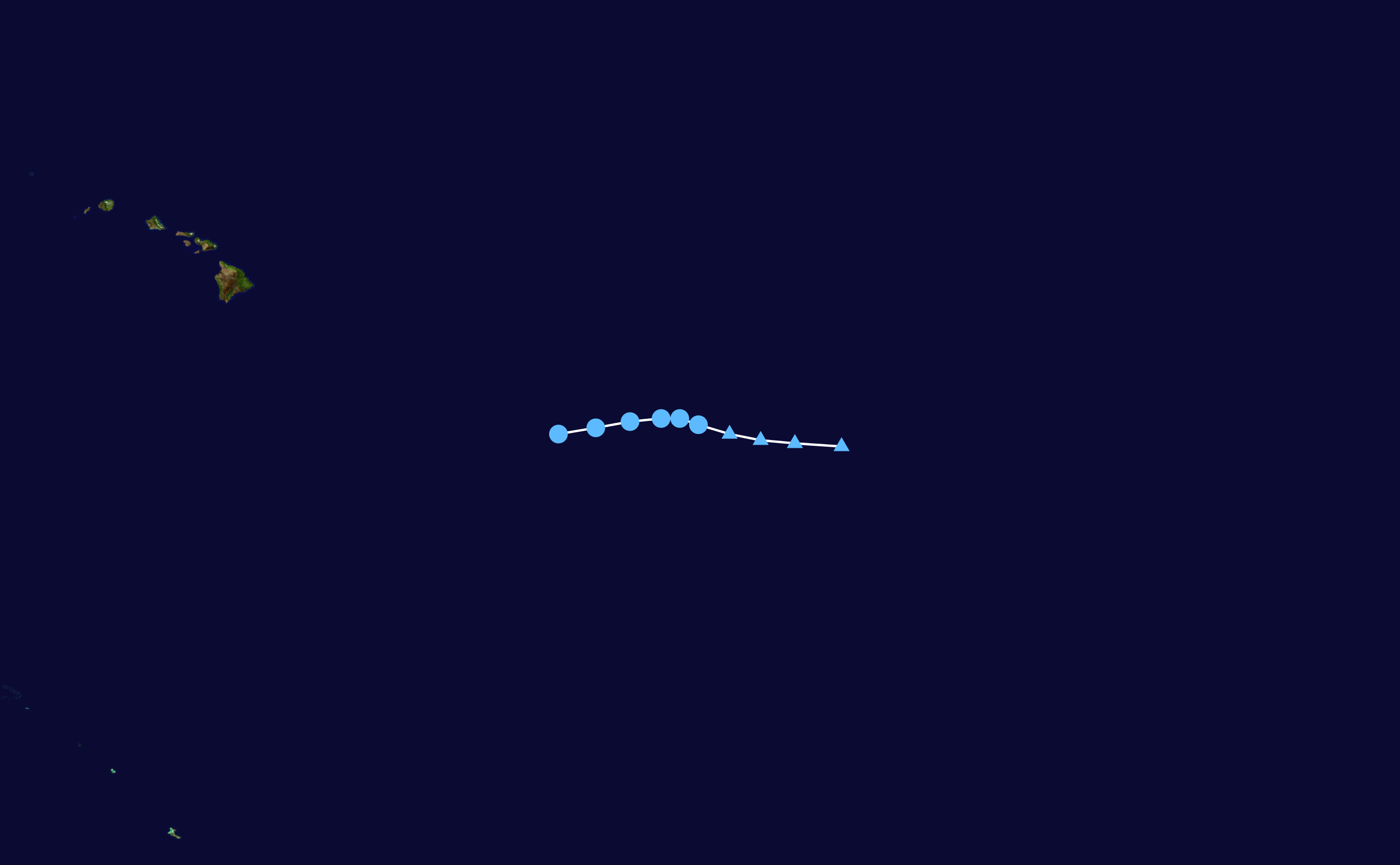
- Duration: August 3 – August 4
- Peak intensity: 30 mph (45 km/h) (1-min); 1008 mbar (hPa)

In late July to early August, an organized thunderstorm cluster persisted within the Intertropical Convergence Zone (ITCZ). Upon further development, the disturbance was designated as a tropical depression as it tracked swiftly west, the first and only cyclone to form in the central Pacific throughout the season. Despite initial forecasts of a minimal tropical storm, increasing wind shear and cooler ocean temperatures prompted the depression to instead dissipate by 00:00 UTC on August 5, having only attained peak winds of 30 mph (48 km/h).

As a tropical cyclone, Tropical Depression One-C had no impact on land. However, the remnants of the depression dropped moderate to heavy rainfall in Hawaii, particularly on the Island of Hawaii. Rainfall totals measured up to 8.8 in (220 mm) in Glenwood, Hawaii. Flash floods was reported in Kona and Ka‘ū, while minor flooding occurred in Hilo, Hamakua, and Kealakekua. In addition, minor street flooding was reported in several cities on that island; most notably, a nearly overflown drainage ditch threatened to submerge the Hawaii Belt Road. Some coffee plants were damaged.

=== Hurricane Fernanda ===
- Category 1 hurricane (SSHWS)
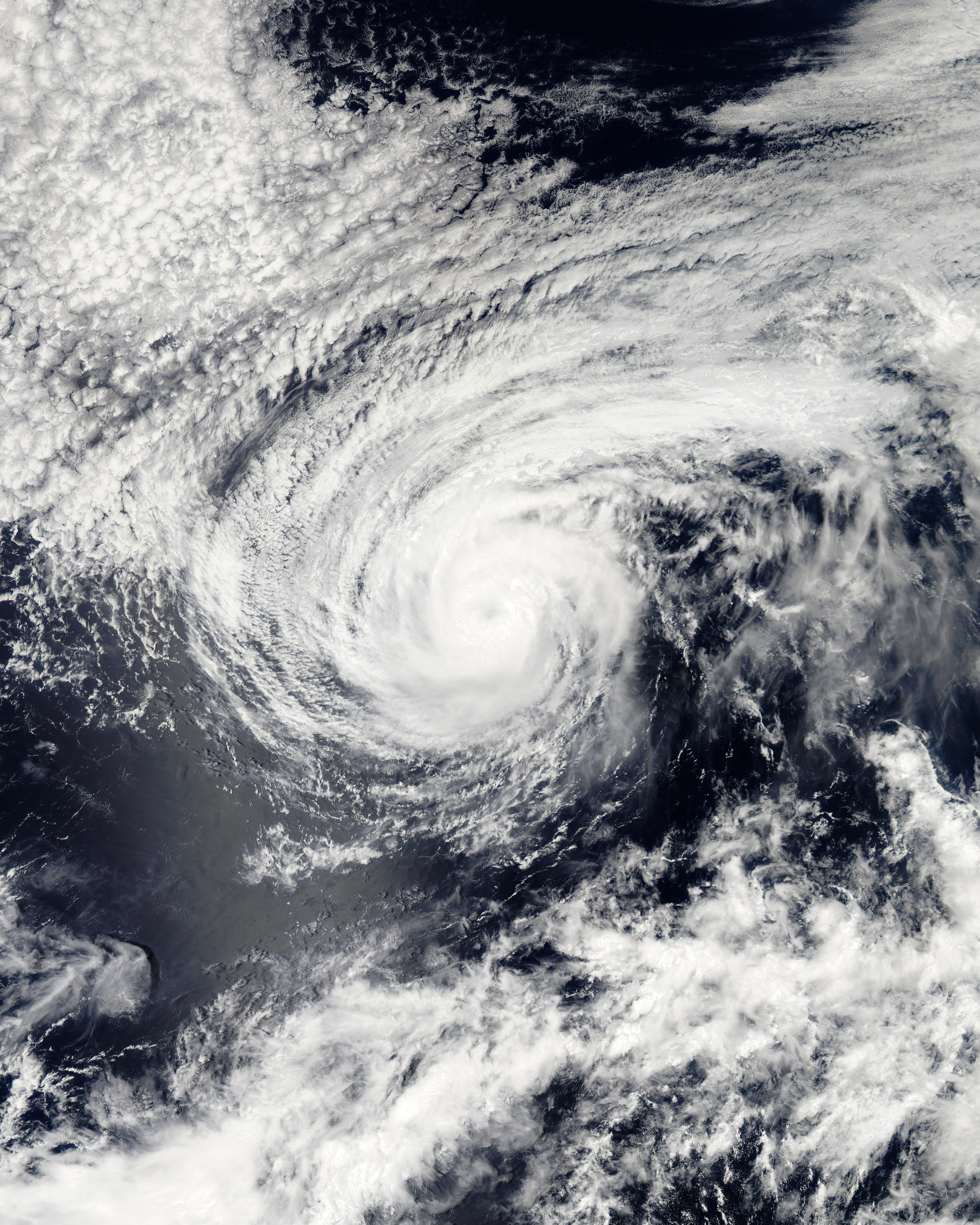
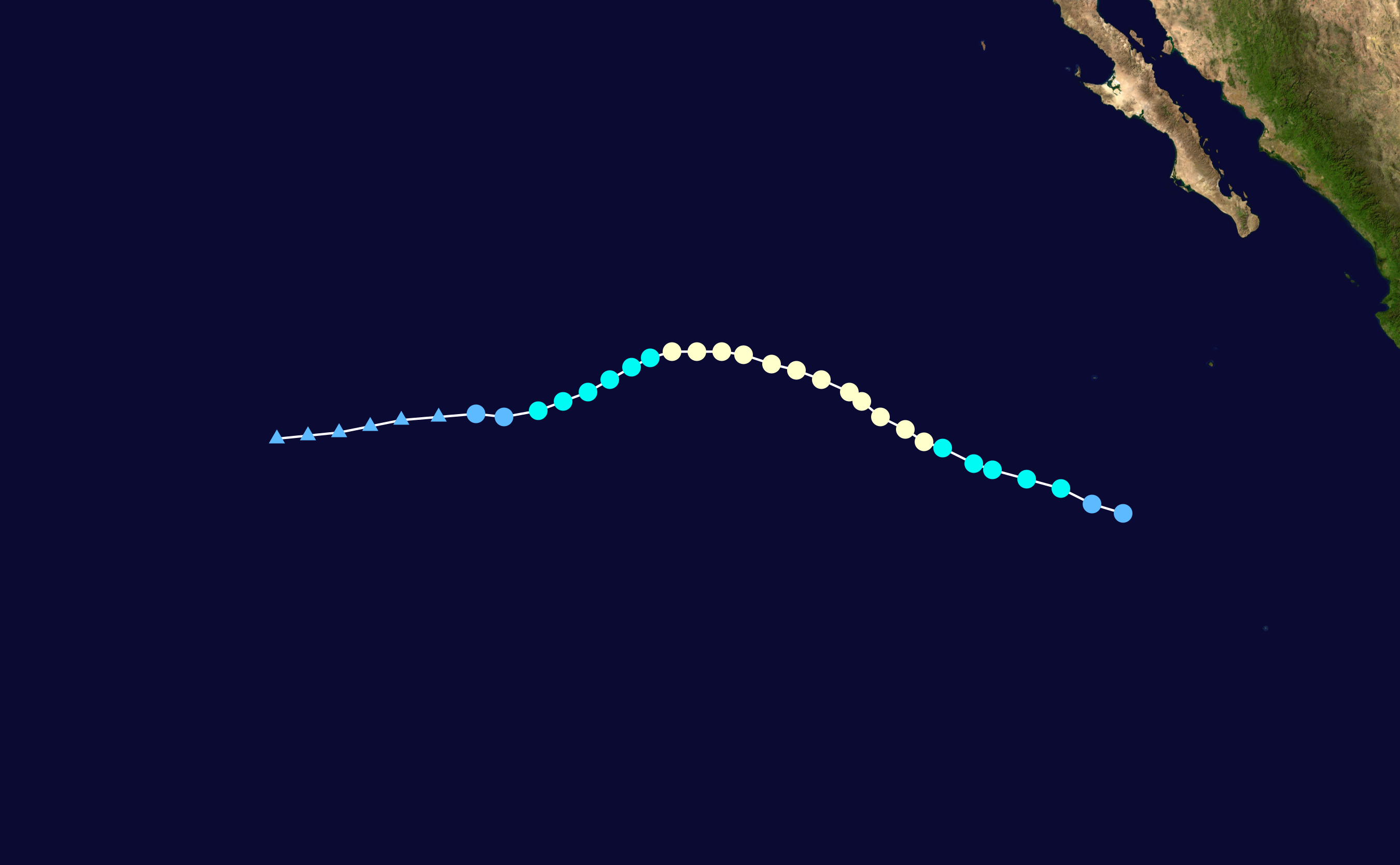
- Duration: August 9 – August 16
- Peak intensity: 85 mph (140 km/h) (1-min); 978 mbar (hPa)

A vigorous tropical wave observed over western Africa in late July maintained vigor until passing the Windward Islands, becoming disorganized as it moved across South America and then into the eastern Pacific on August 5. Convection gradually redeveloped south of Mexico, leading to the formation of a tropical depression by 12:00 UTC on August 9 and intensification into Tropical Storm Fernanda twelve hours later. The nascent cyclone continued on a west-northwesterly course amid a favorable shear regime; it became a hurricane at 06:00 UTC on August 11 and attained peak winds of 85 mph (137 km/h) early the next day as a ragged eye became discernible. After leveling off in intensity, Fernanda fell to tropical storm intensity early on August 14, weakened to a tropical depression late on August 15, and degenerated into a remnant low by 06:00 UTC on August 16, all the while diving west-southwest. The low produced intermittent convection until dissipating the next day.

=== Tropical Storm Greg ===
- Tropical storm (SSHWS)
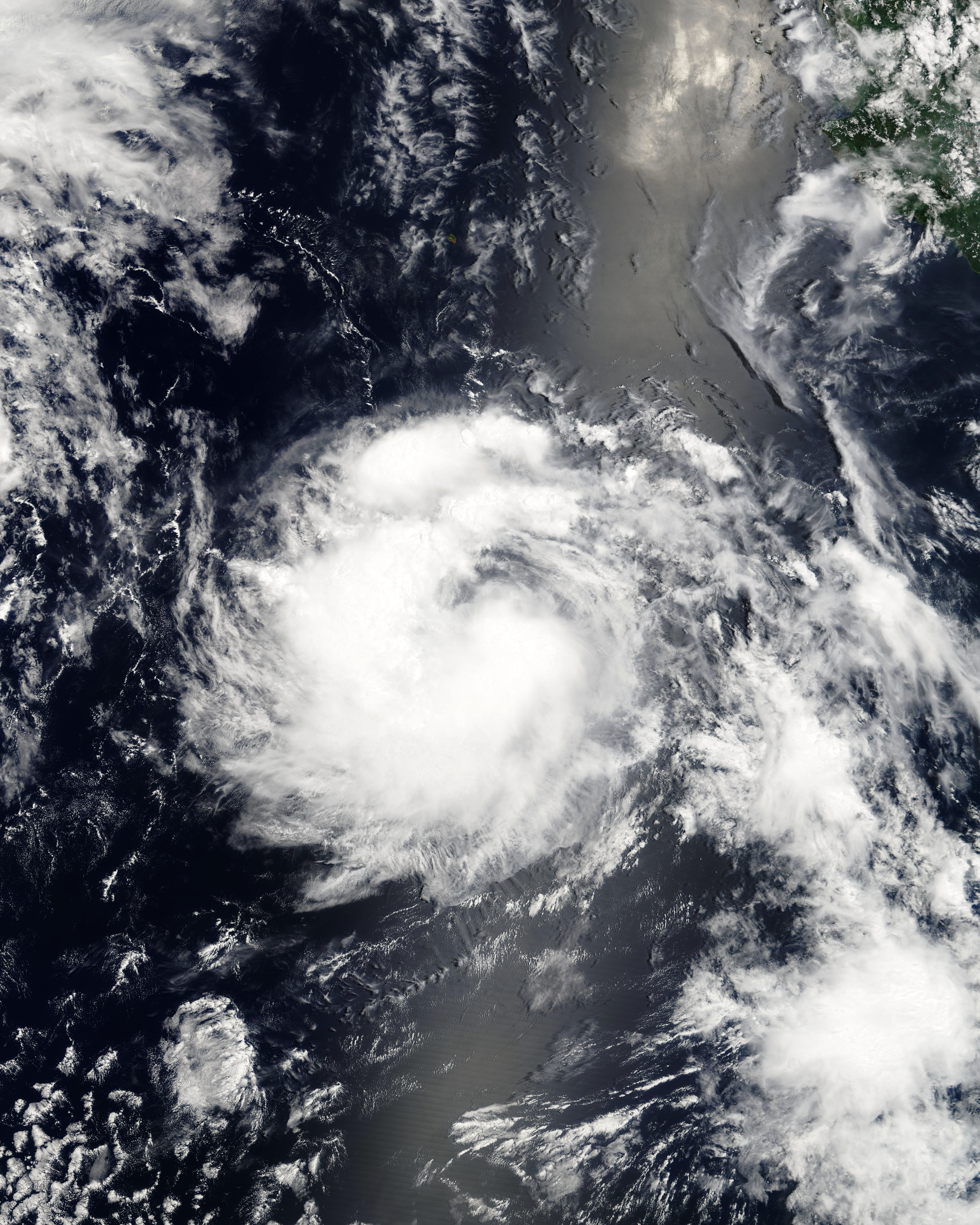
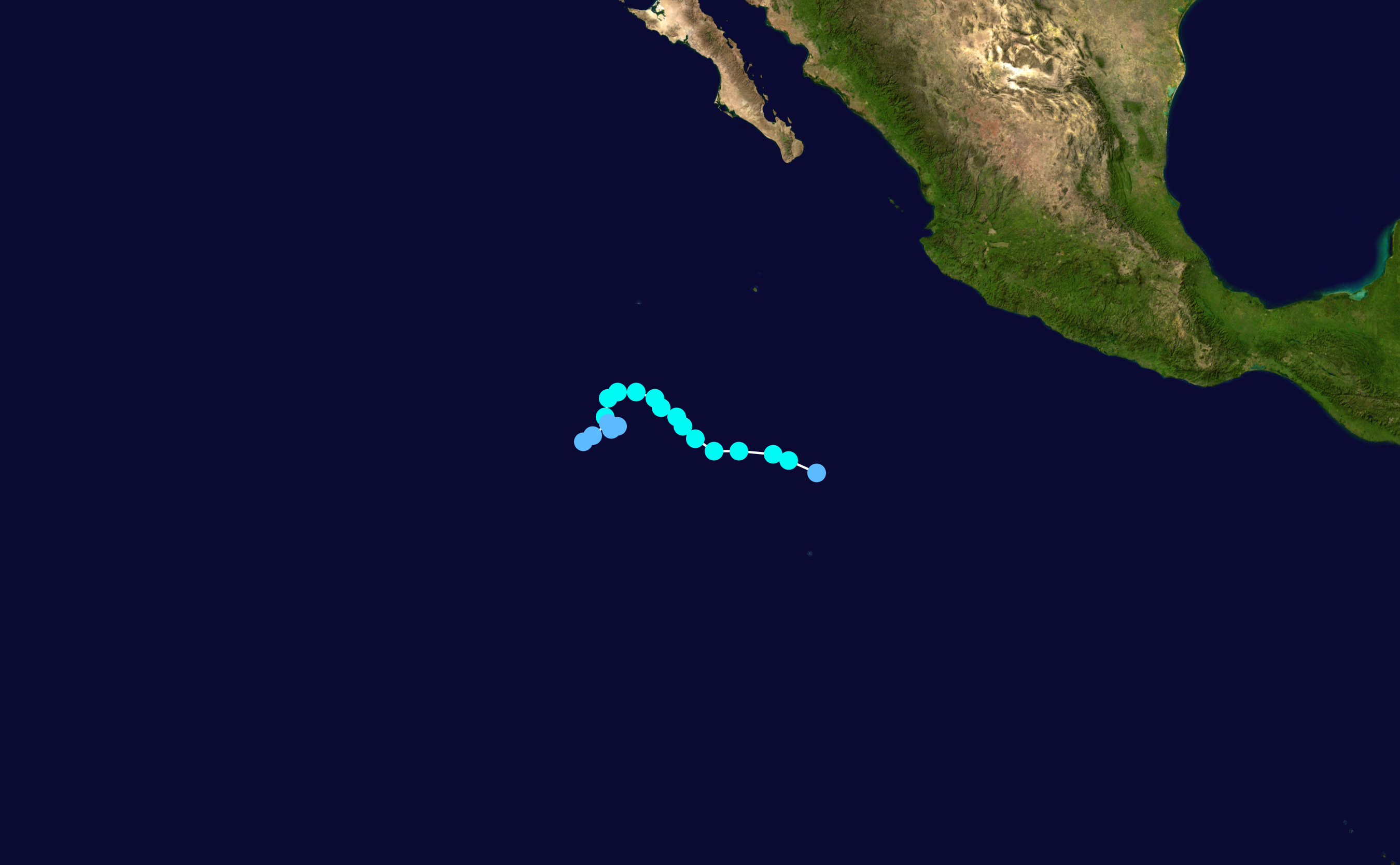
- Duration: August 11 – August 15
- Peak intensity: 50 mph (85 km/h) (1-min); 1000 mbar (hPa)

A tropical wave that first crossed the western coastline of Africa on July 27 entered the eastern Pacific ten days later, gradually developing into a tropical depression by 06:00 UTC on August 11. The depression trekked west-northwest along the southern periphery of a subtropical ridge, intensifying into Tropical Storm Greg six hours after formation and reaching peak winds of 50 mph (80 km/h) by 00:00 UTC on August 12 as deep convection flared near the center and upper-level outflow became well established. Northerly shear from nearby Fernanda and a nearby upper-level trough caused Greg to level off and maintain its status as a low-end tropical storm for several days as steering currents collapsed. Drifting south, stronger upper-level winds caused Greg to weaken to tropical depression intensity by 18:00 UTC on August 14 before degenerating into a remnant low by 00:00 UTC on August 16. The low was absorbed into the ITCZ shortly thereafter.

=== Hurricane Hilary ===
- Category 2 hurricane (SSHWS)
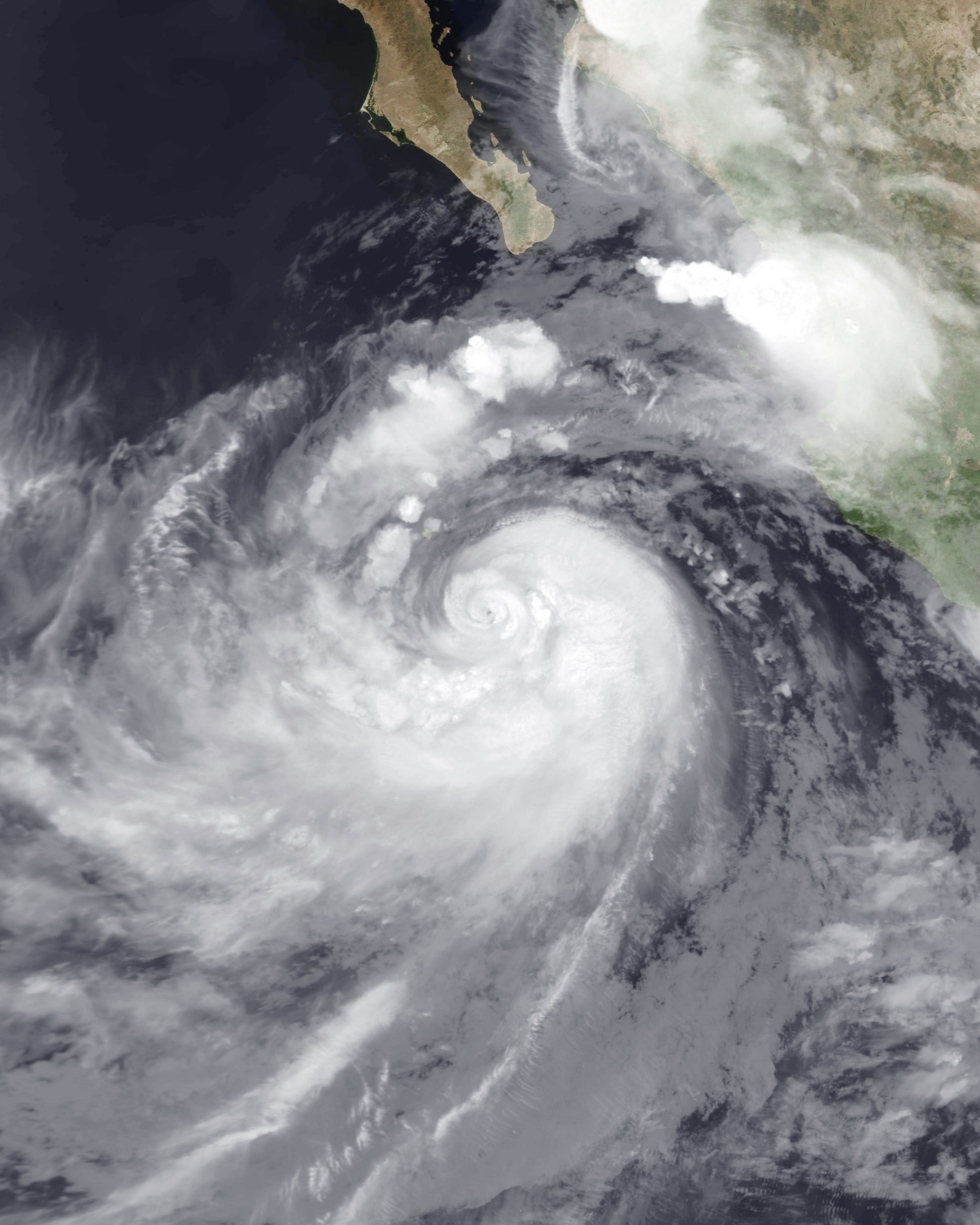
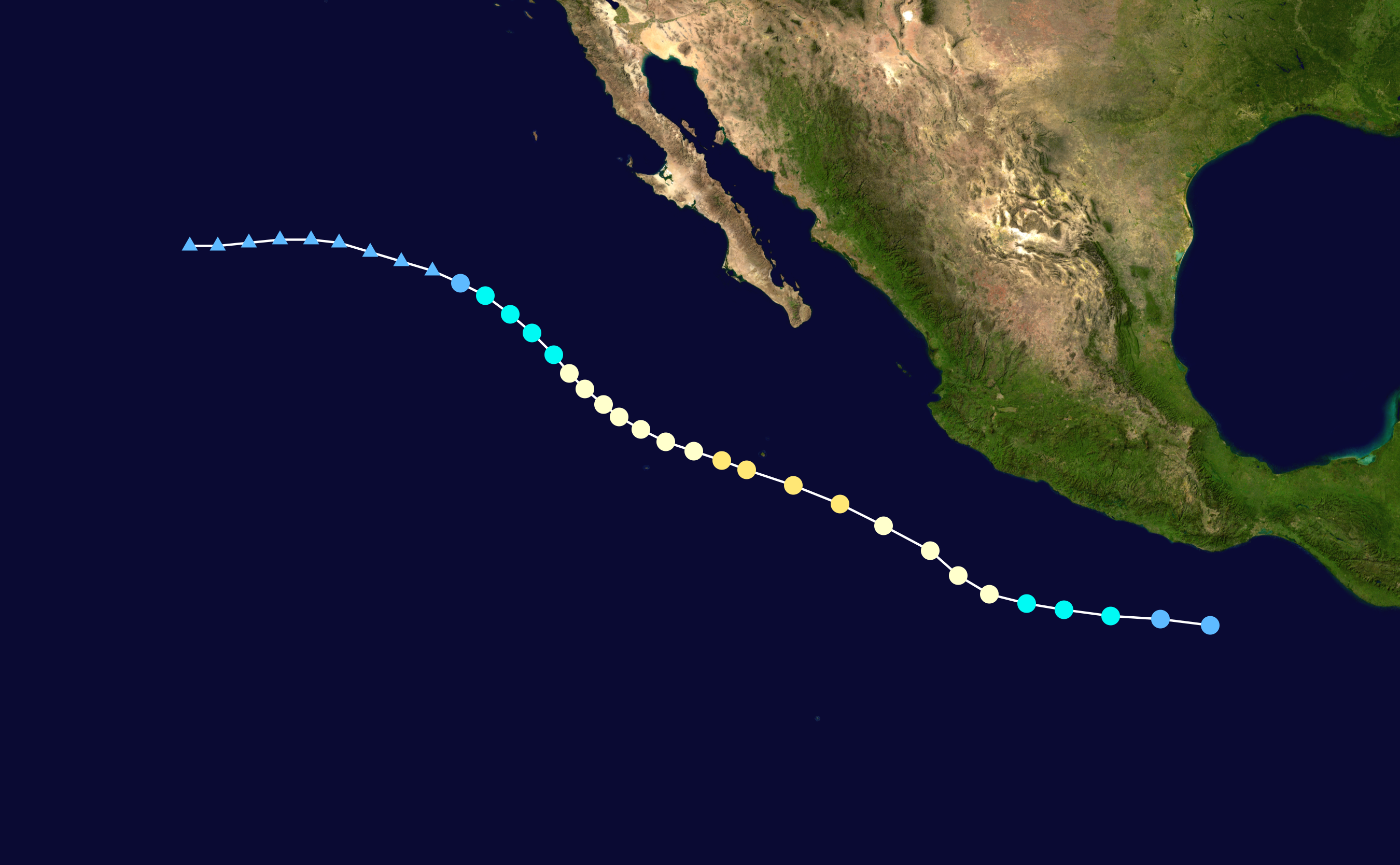
- Duration: August 19 – August 25
- Peak intensity: 105 mph (165 km/h) (1-min); 970 mbar (hPa)

A tropical wave moved off the western coast of Africa on August 4, eventually organizing into a tropical depression south of Mexico by 18:00 UTC on August 19. Twelve hours later, the depression intensified into Tropical Storm Hilary. The newly named system tracked west after formation, steered on the south side of a subtropical ridge. Favorable upper-level winds and warm ocean temperatures allowed it to quickly intensify, and Hilary became a hurricane by 00:00 UTC on August 21. After leveling off briefly, the cyclone attained its peak as a Category 2 hurricane with winds of 105 mph (169 km/h) early the next morning, consistent with a ragged eye on infrared satellite imagery. Hilary entered a progressively cooler ocean after peak, resulting in the loss of deep convection. The system fell to tropical storm intensity late on August 24, tropical depression intensity late on August 25, and degenerated to a remnant low by 00:00 UTC on August 26. The low moved generally west until dissipating early on August 28.

=== Tropical Storm Irwin ===
- Tropical storm (SSHWS)
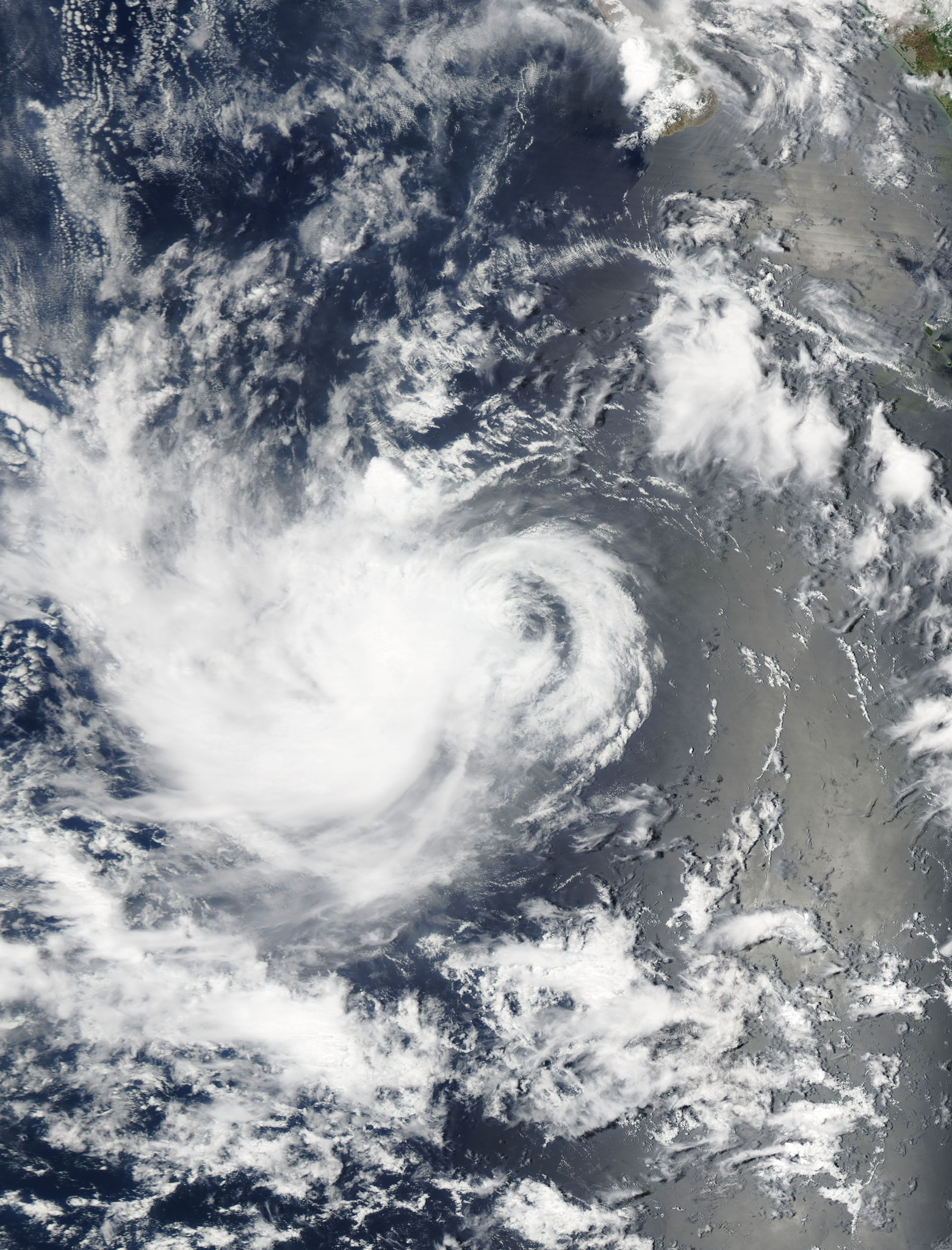
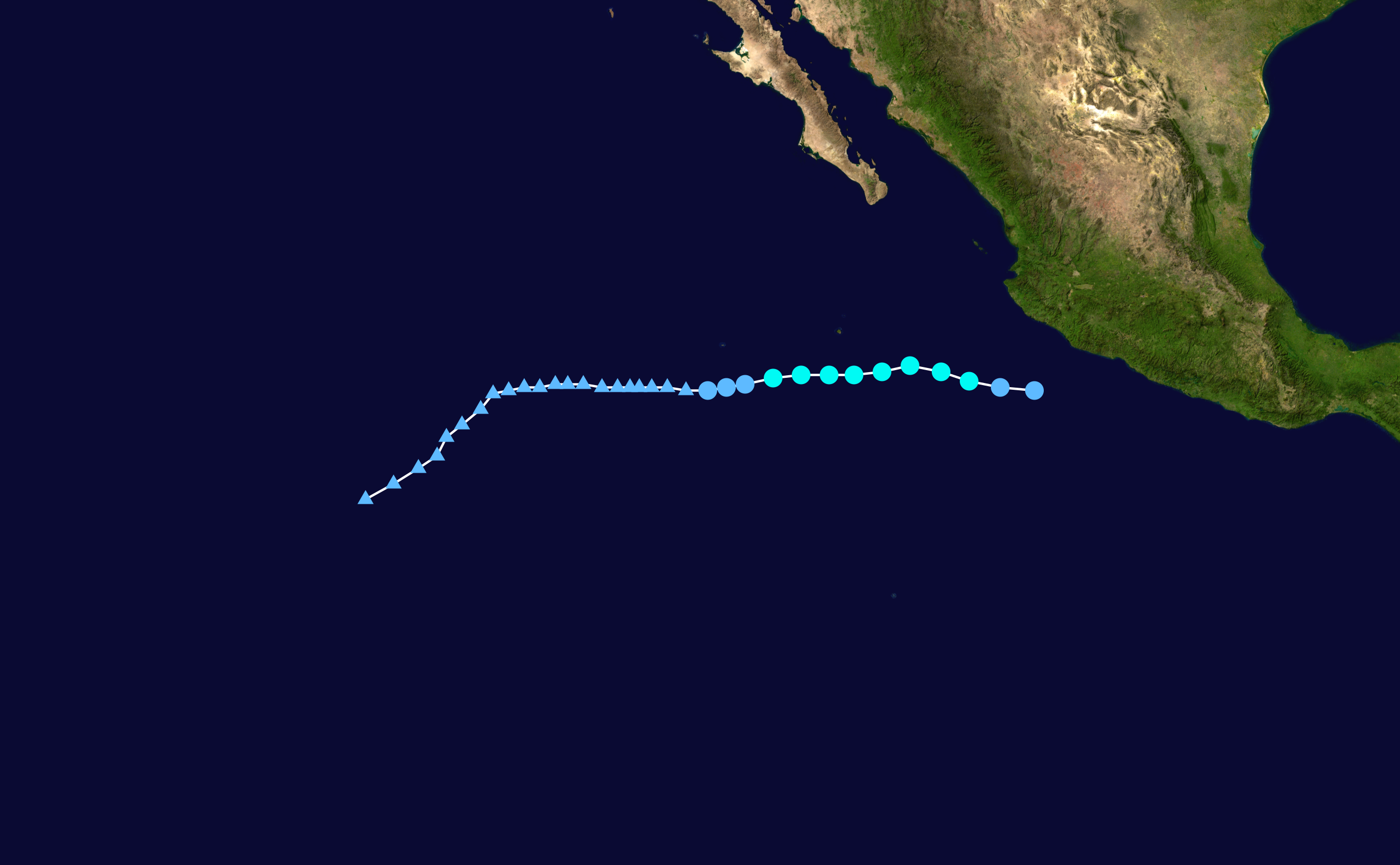
- Duration: August 25 – August 28
- Peak intensity: 50 mph (85 km/h) (1-min); 1000 mbar (hPa)

The formation of Irwin can be traced to a tropical wave that emerged off Africa on August 10. It continued west, fracturing into two portions near the Leeward Islands; the northern half aided in the formation of Hurricane Katrina, whereas the southern portion continued into the eastern Pacific. Steady organization led to the formation of a tropical depression by 12:00 UTC on August 25 and intensification into a tropical storm twelve hours later. With the center located on the edge of deep convection, Irwin attained peak winds of 50 mph (80 km/h) early on August 26 before northeasterly wind shear prompted weakening. The cyclone fell to tropical depression intensity early on August 28 and further degenerated to a remnant low by 18:00 UTC on August 28. The low moved west and then southwest until dissipating on September 3.

=== Hurricane Jova ===
- Category 3 hurricane (SSHWS)
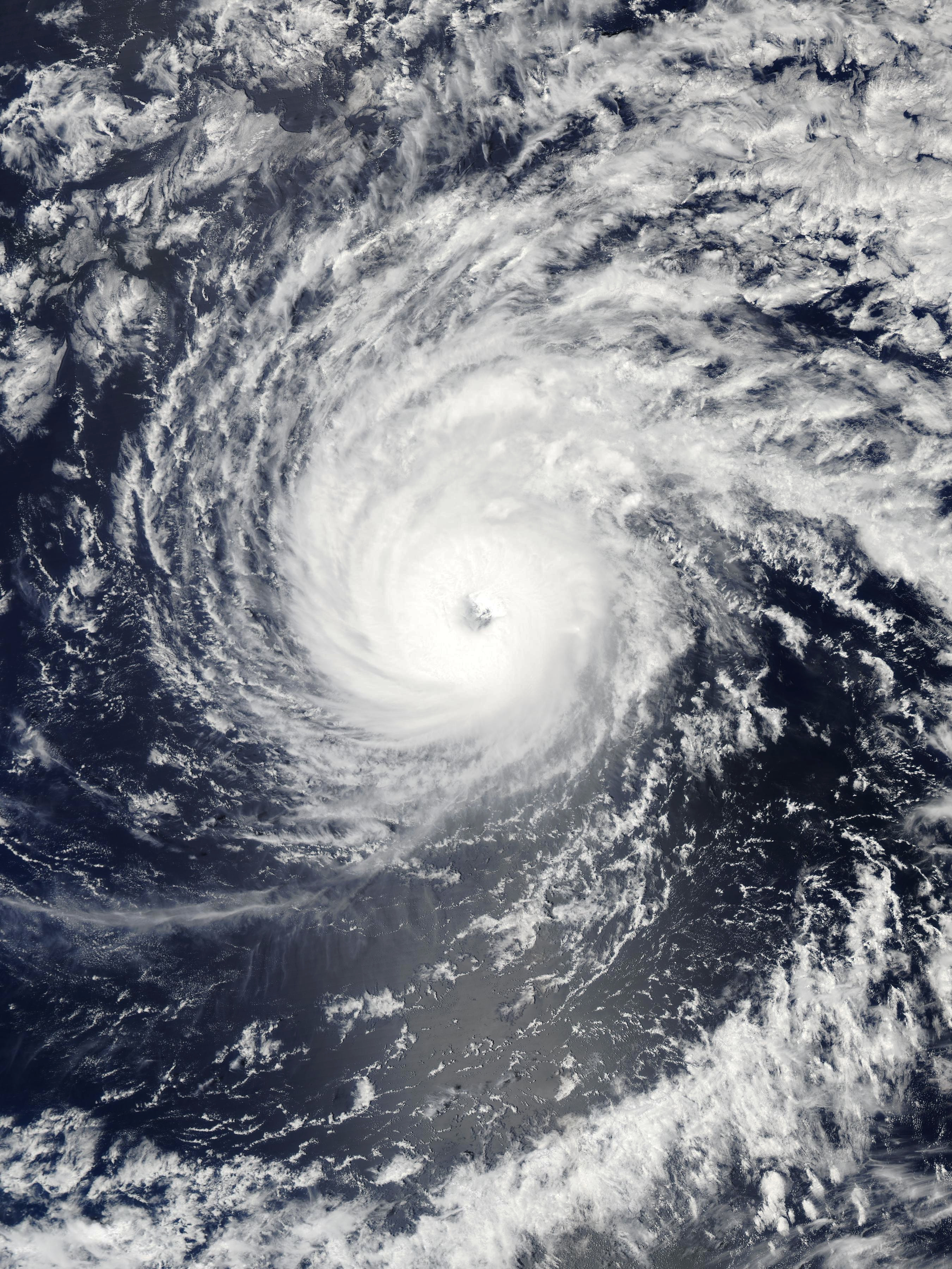
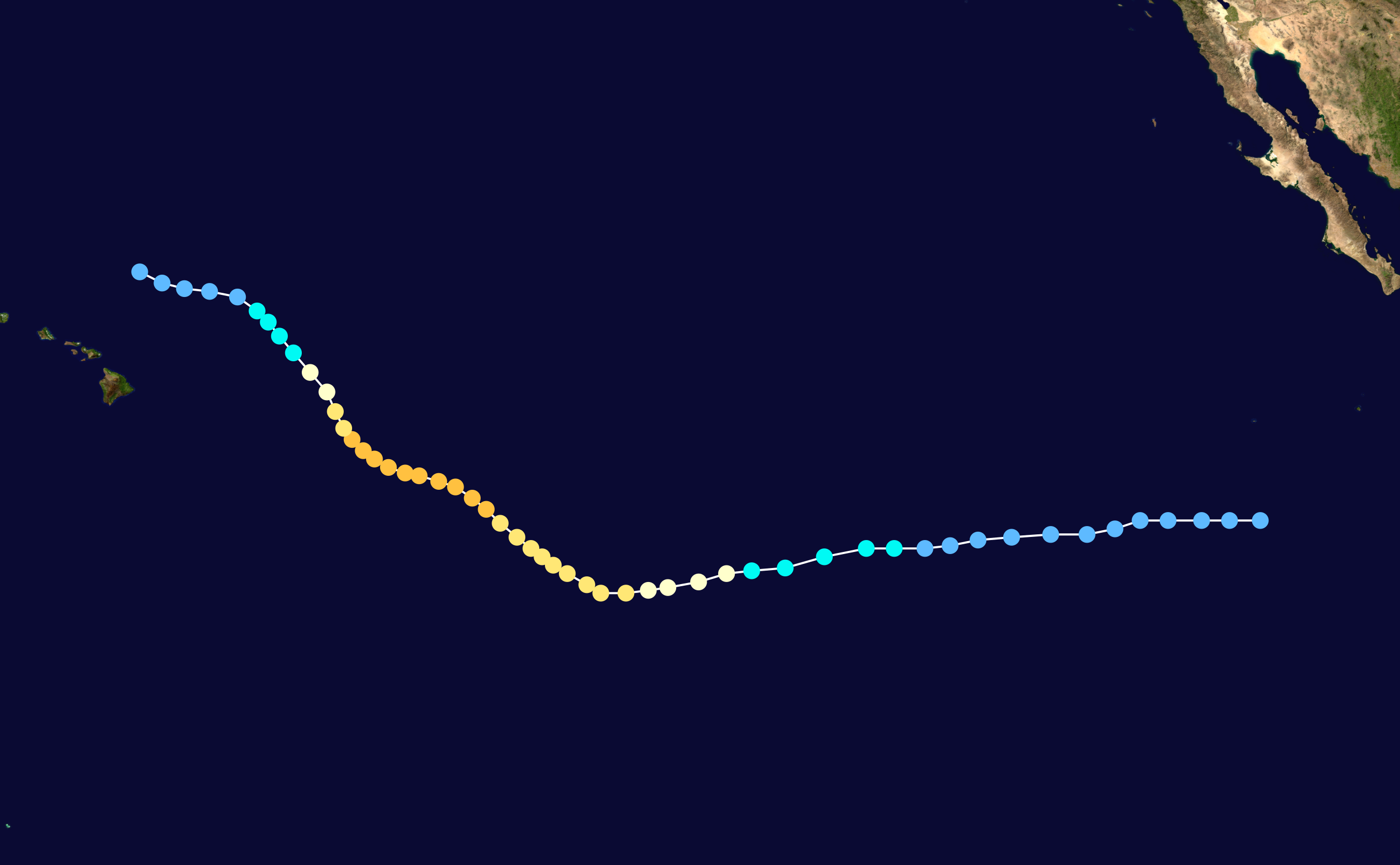
- Duration: September 12 – September 25
- Peak intensity: 125 mph (205 km/h) (1-min); 951 mbar (hPa)

A tropical wave emerged off the western coast of Africa on August 28. Similar to the setup that spawned Irwin, the northern half of the wave fractured and led to the formation of Hurricane Maria, whereas the southern part of the wave continued into the eastern Pacific on September 4. The disturbance initially changed little in organization; an increase in convection on September 12, however, aided in the formation of a tropical depression by 00:00 UTC that day. Affected by moderate easterly shear, the depression failed to intensify into Tropical Storm Jova until 00:00 UTC on September 15. The cyclone intensified at a faster rate thereafter, attaining hurricane intensity early the next day as it turned west-southwest. Jova crossed into the central Pacific early on September 18, where environmental conditions favored continued intensification. As the storm moved into the basin, it abruptly turned northwest toward a weakness in the subtropical ridge.

Nearby dry air acted to temporarily but significantly weaken Jova's spiral banding despite a favorable upper-level environment. By 12:00 UTC on September 19, however, it intensified into the first major hurricane – a Category 3 or larger on the Saffir–Simpson hurricane wind scale – of the season; twelve hours later, it attained peak winds of 125 mph (201 km/h). Cooler ocean temperatures took their toll on Jova as it progressed westward, with Jova falling to tropical storm intensity early on September 23, dropping to tropical depression intensity early on September 24, and ultimately dissipating by 06:00 UTC on September 25 a few hundred miles north of Hilo, Hawaii.

=== Hurricane Kenneth ===
- Category 4 hurricane (SSHWS)
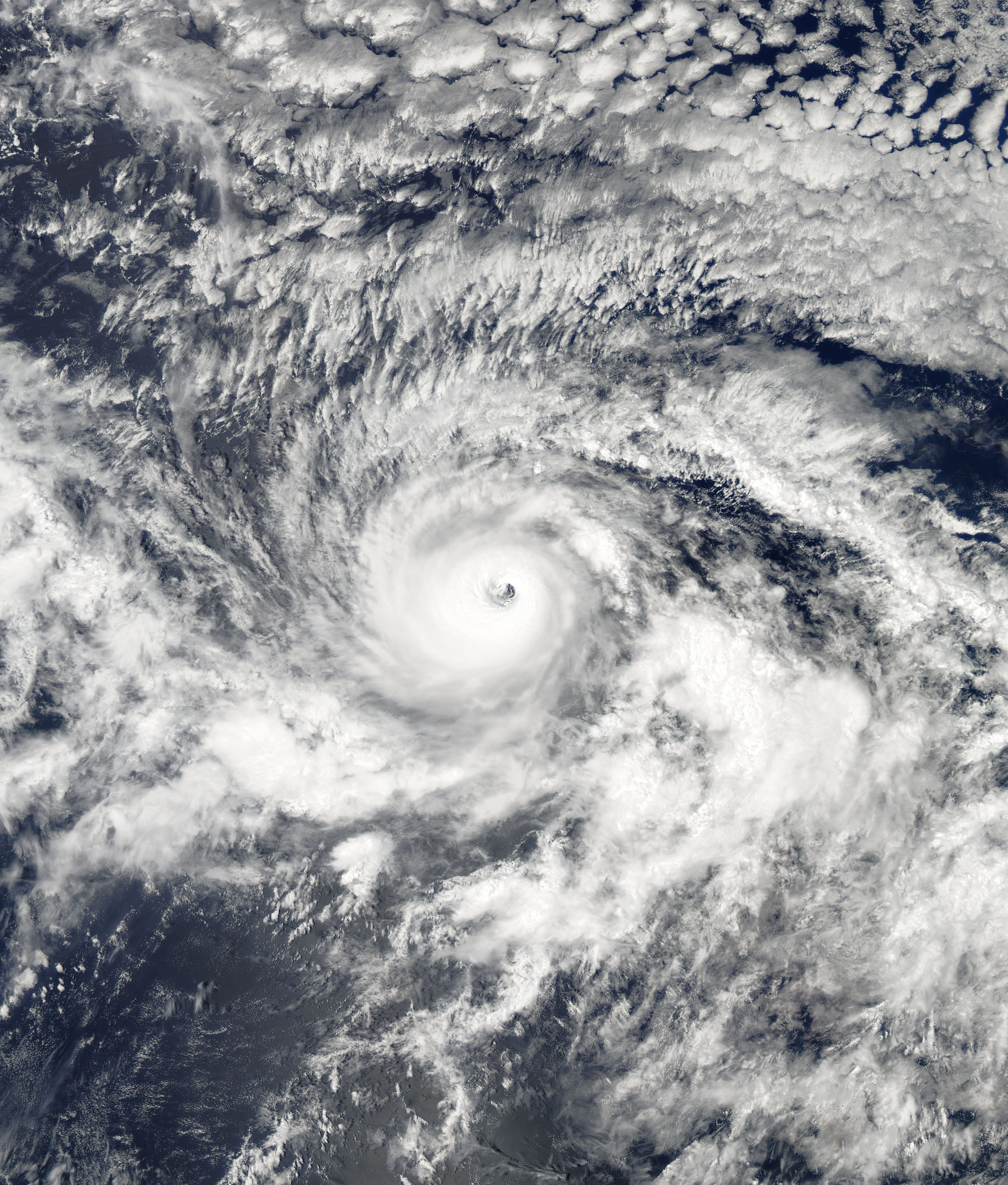
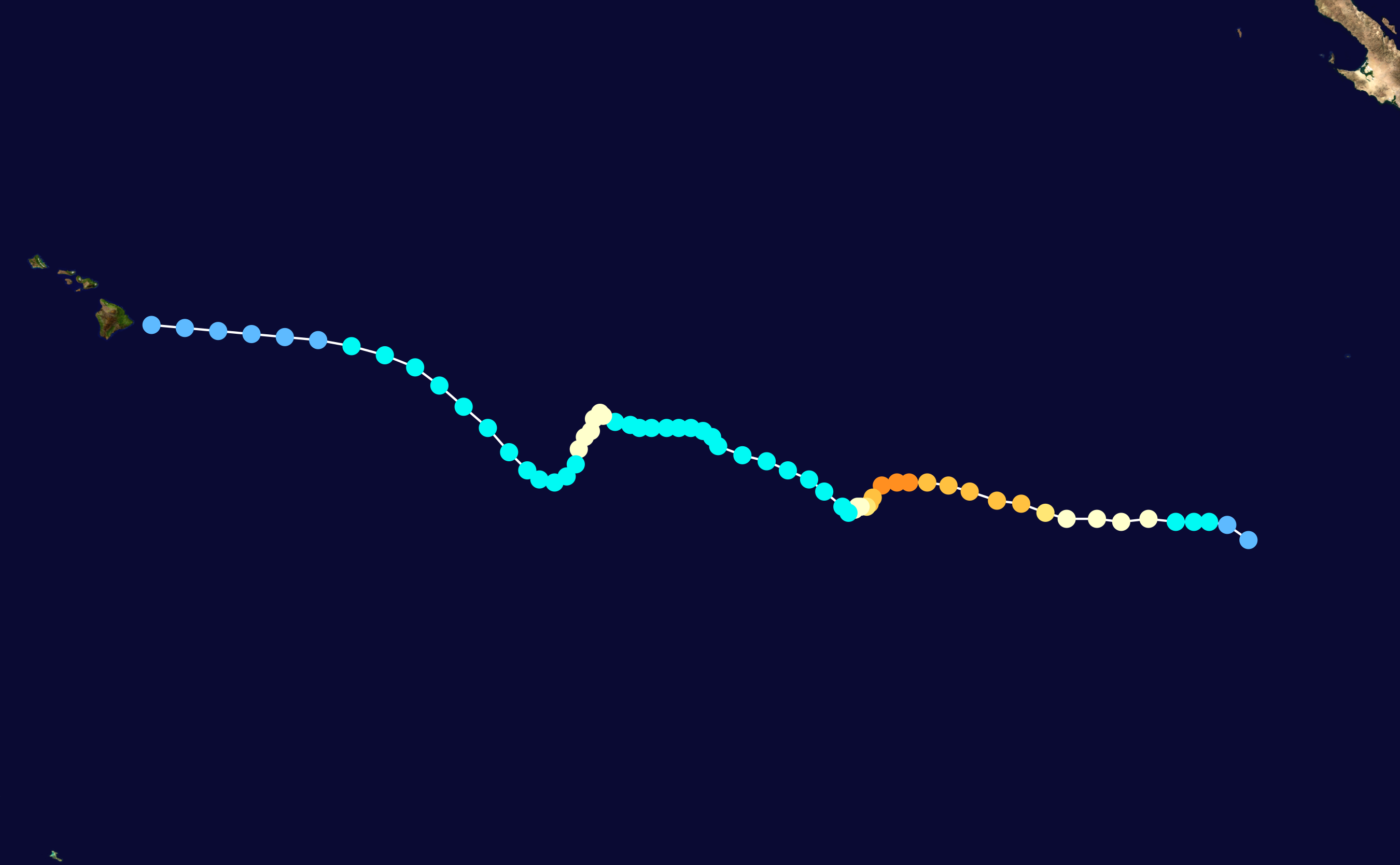
- Duration: September 14 – September 30
- Peak intensity: 130 mph (215 km/h) (1-min); 947 mbar (hPa)

A tropical wave into the eastern North Pacific Ocean on September 9 within the Intertropical Convergence Zone. On September 13, its associated thunderstorm activity began showing signs of organization. On the next day, Tropical Depression Eleven-E developed 900 miles (1,400 km) west-southwest of Cabo San Lucas, Mexico. The depression maintained a general westward track due to the subtropical ridge to its north. With low wind shear and warm water temperatures, the depression intensified into Tropical Storm Kenneth early on September 15. The storm quickly developed banding features as its convection formed into a central area of deep convection. Kenneth attained hurricane status early on September 16, and major hurricane status the next day, with an eye surrounded by cold cloud tops. Kenneth strengthened to reach peak sustained winds of 135 mph (217 km/h), a Category 4 hurricane on the Saffir-Simpson scale, on September 18 about 1,725 miles (2,776 km) east of the Big Island of Hawaii.

After maintaining peak strength for about 18 hours, Kenneth began a sharp weakening trend due to north-northeasterly wind shear. While weakening, the hurricane turned to a southwest drift, due to a weakness in steering currents. By September 21, its circulation was exposed to the east-northeast of the convection. By September 20, its deepest convection was confined to the southern half of the hurricane, and later in the day Kenneth weakened to tropical storm status. Kenneth began a steady west-northwest track due to a ridge to its north. However, deep convection re-developed near the center as the outflow became better defined. On September 24, the motion became nearly stationary as steering currents again weakened. Vertical shear sharply declined, allowing the convection to become more symmetrical and for an eye feature to develop. On September 25, Kenneth again attained hurricane status while located about 1,085 miles (1,746 km) east-southeast of the Big Island of Hawaii. It maintained minimal hurricane status for about 30 hours, during which it entered the area of responsibility of the Central Pacific Hurricane Center. Increasing shear weakened Kenneth to tropical storm status on September 26, and it began a northwest track under the influence of low- to mid-level steering flow. By September 27, most convection had dissipated. Convection intermittently reformed near the center, though wind shear and cooler water temperatures prevented restrengthening. On September 29, an intensifying upper-level trough over the Hawaiian Islands weakened Kenneth to a tropical depression. Thunderstorms failed to reform, and on September 30 it degenerated into a tropical wave about 40 miles (64 km) east of the Big Island of Hawaii.

The remnants of Kenneth caused flooding in Hawaii. Peak rainfall totals on Oahu included reports of up to 12 inches (300 mm). Rains caused the Kaukonahua Stream to burst its banks and Lake Wilson to overflow behind the Wahiawa Dam. The rainfall produced up to 1 foot (300 mm) of water on Pali Highway, leading to surface runoff which flooded a few homes. On Kauai, flooding occurred on the Hanalei River, which resulted in the closure of the Kuhio Highway at the Hanalei Bridge. Kenneth also generated surf of 8–10 ft (2.4–3.0 m) along the east shores of Hawaii, Kauai, Molokai, Maui, and Oahu.

=== Tropical Storm Lidia ===
- Tropical storm (SSHWS)
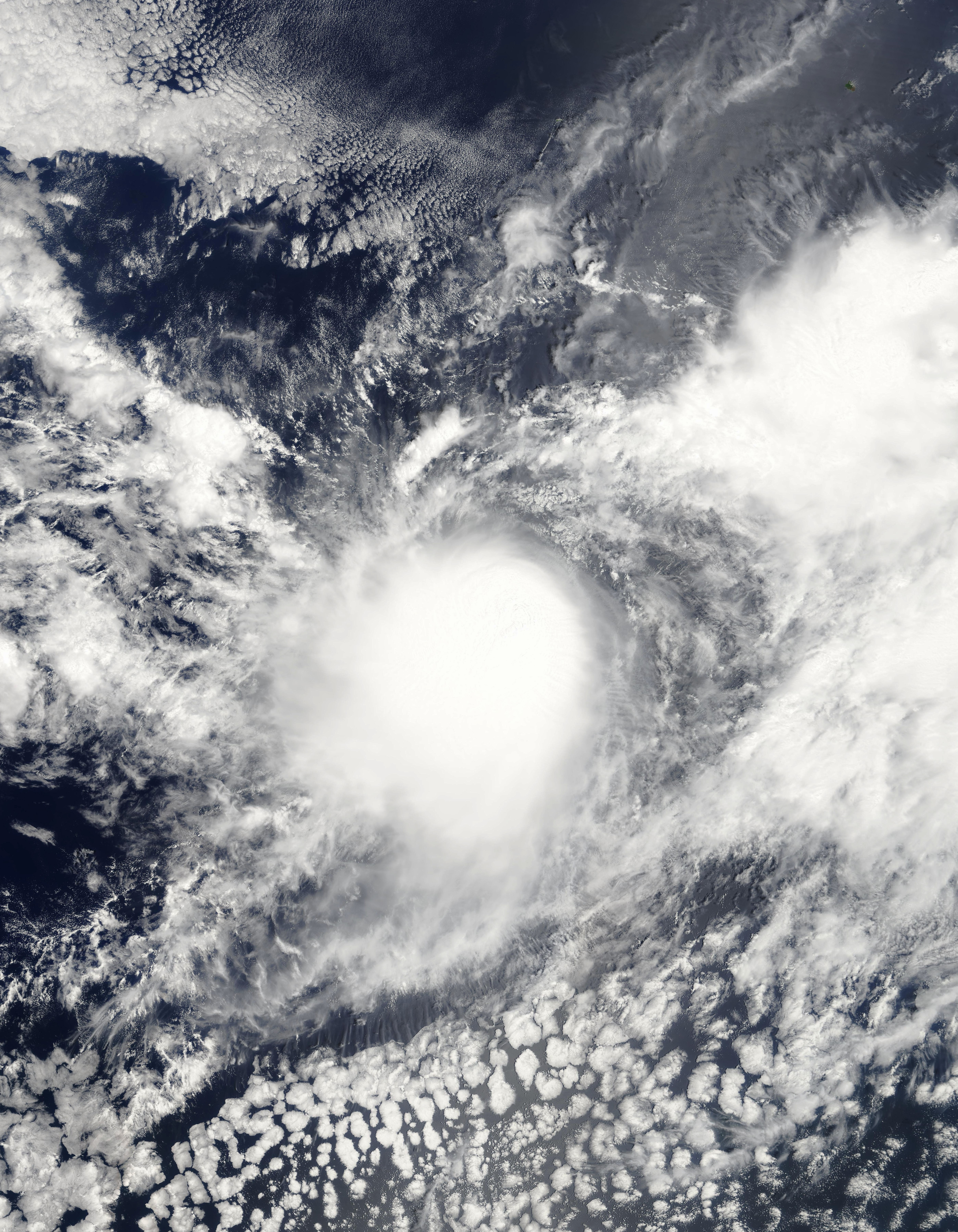
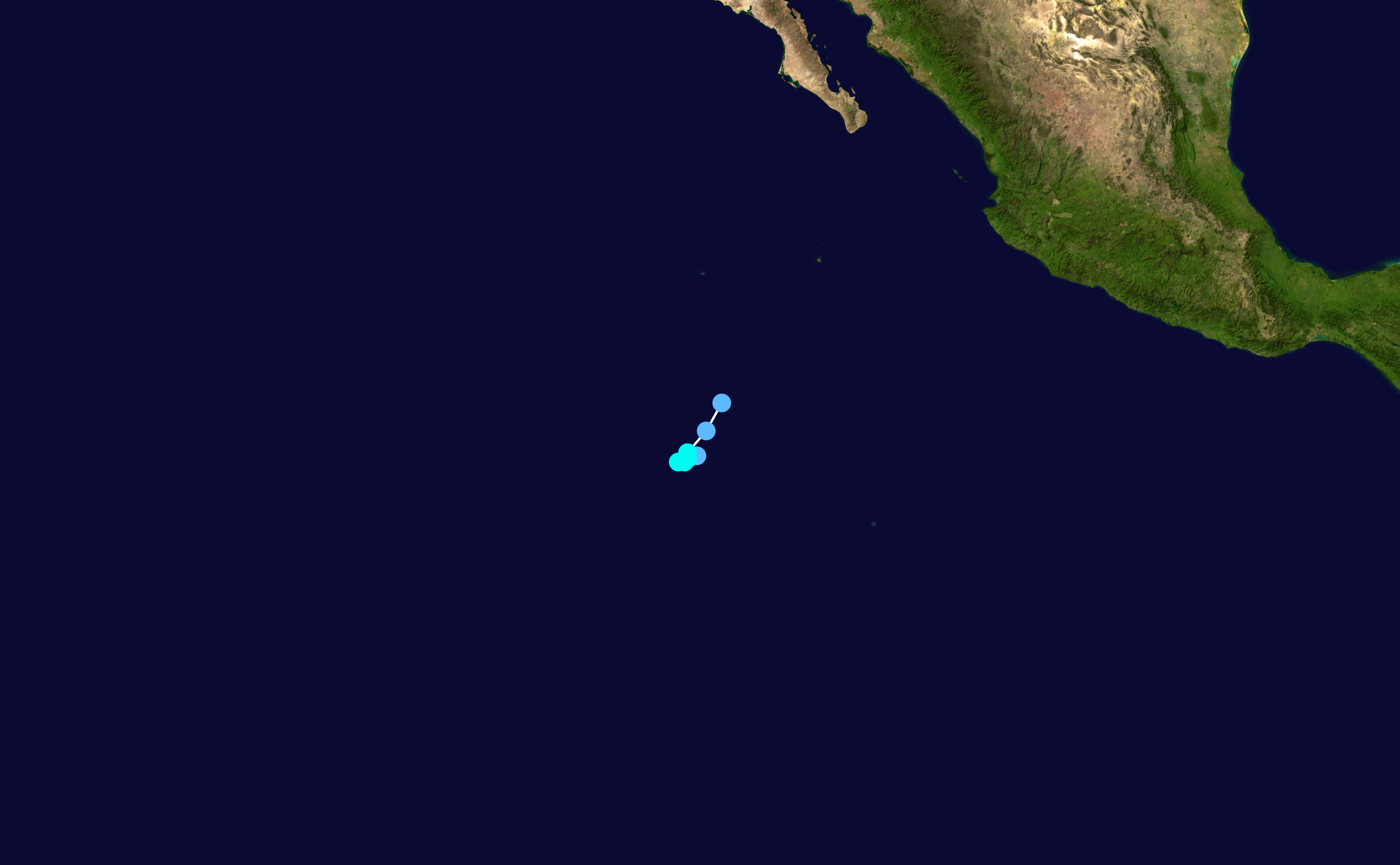
- Duration: September 17 – September 19
- Peak intensity: 40 mph (65 km/h) (1-min); 1005 mbar (hPa)

In mid-September, a series of tropical waves entered the eastern Pacific from the Caribbean Sea. One of these waves led to the formation of a tropical depression by 12:00 UTC on September 17, which intensified into Tropical Storm Lidia and attained peak winds of 40 mph (64 km/h) six hours later. Initial forecasts were of low confidence, with forecasters citing uncertainty in whether Lidia or a developing disturbance to its east would become the dominant cyclone. Nearly stationary, the cyclone's cloud pattern soon became distorted by the much larger circulation of developing Tropical Storm Max. Lidia weakened to a tropical depression late on September 18 and was completely absorbed by Max twelve hours later.

=== Hurricane Max ===
- Category 1 hurricane (SSHWS)
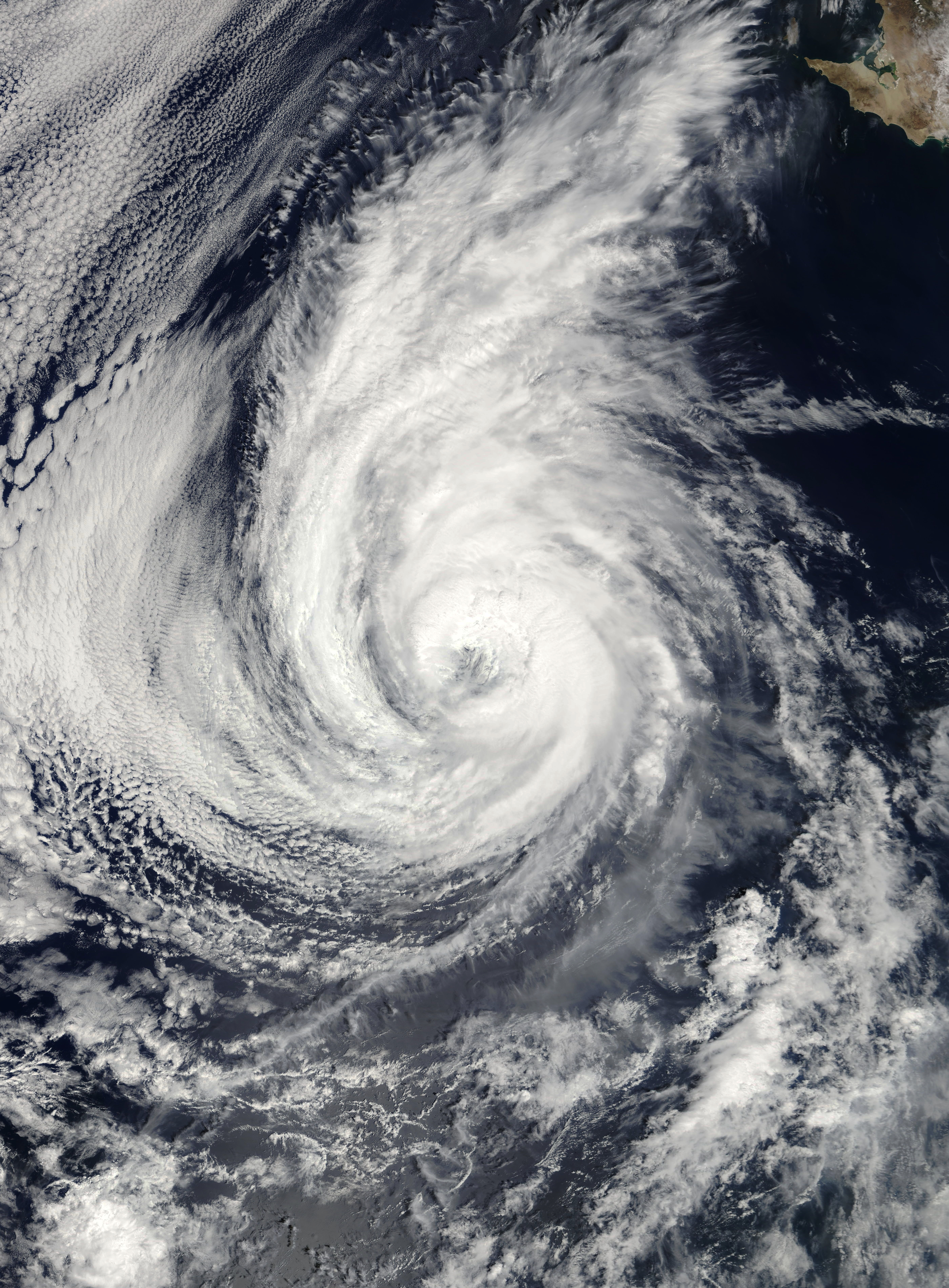
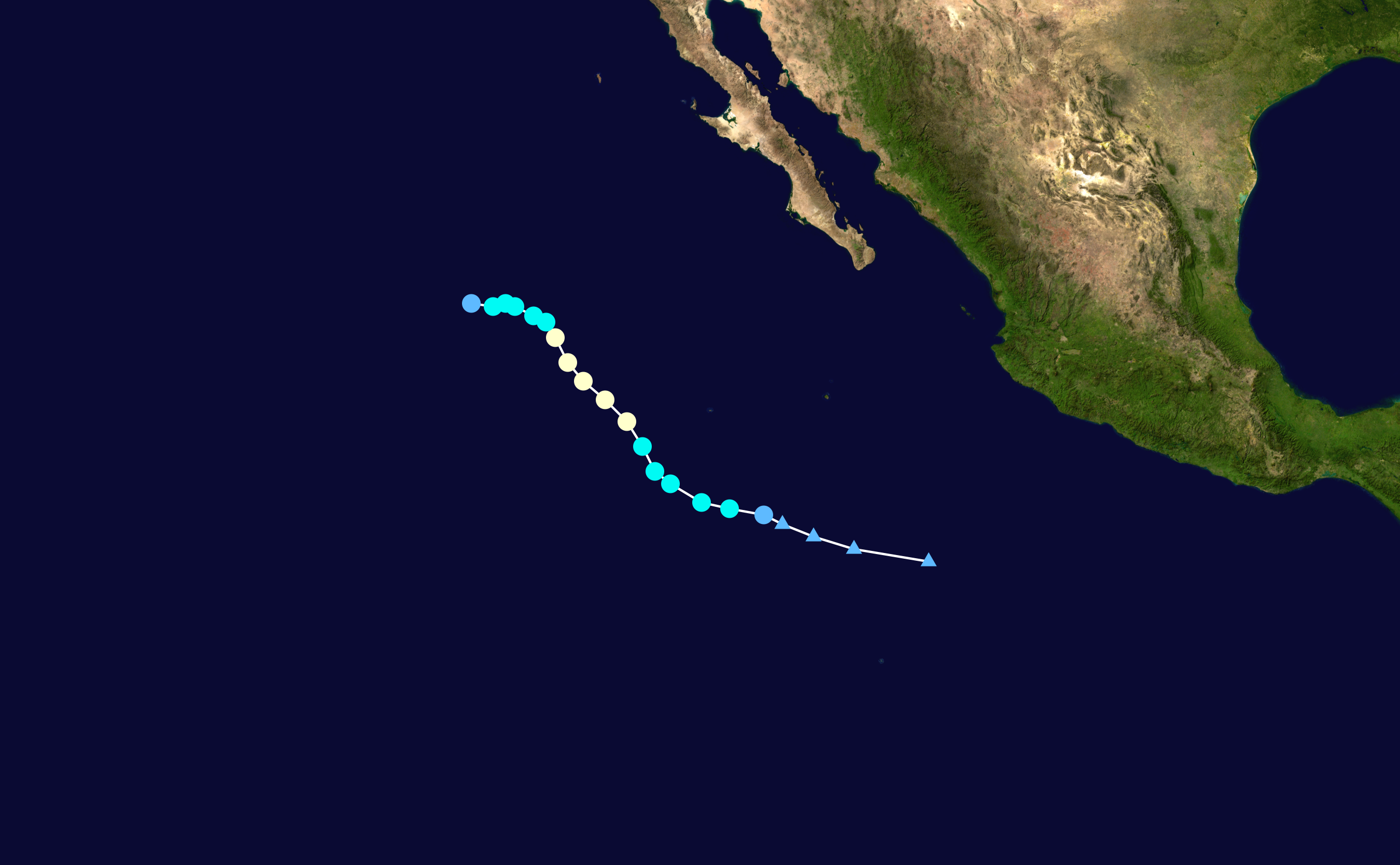
- Duration: September 18 – September 22
- Peak intensity: 85 mph (140 km/h) (1-min); 981 mbar (hPa)

A tropical wave exited Africa on September 4, entering the eastern Pacific nine days later. The disturbance was initially slow to organize due to its broad nature, but finally began to show signs of organization early on September 18 as the system approached a stalled-out Tropical Storm Lidia. Remnants of Hurricane Max brought a weak cold front, heavy rainfall in Southern California on September 20. The system became a tropical depression by 12:00 UTC that day and intensified into Tropical Storm Max six hours later, simultaneously absorbing the weaker, much smaller Lidia. The storm turned northwest on the periphery of a subtropical ridge and continued to develop in a light wind shear environment. Max became a hurricane by 00:00 UTC on September 20 and attained peak winds of 85 mph (137 km/h) twelve hours later, as a large but well-defined eye became apparent. It began steady weakening shortly thereafter as the storm entered cooler waters, falling to tropical storm intensity early on September 21 and further to tropical depression status early the next day as a mid-level ridge forced it back west. Max degenerated to a remnant low by 18:00 UTC on September 22, which then drifted south before dissipating on September 26.

=== Tropical Storm Norma ===
- Tropical storm (SSHWS)
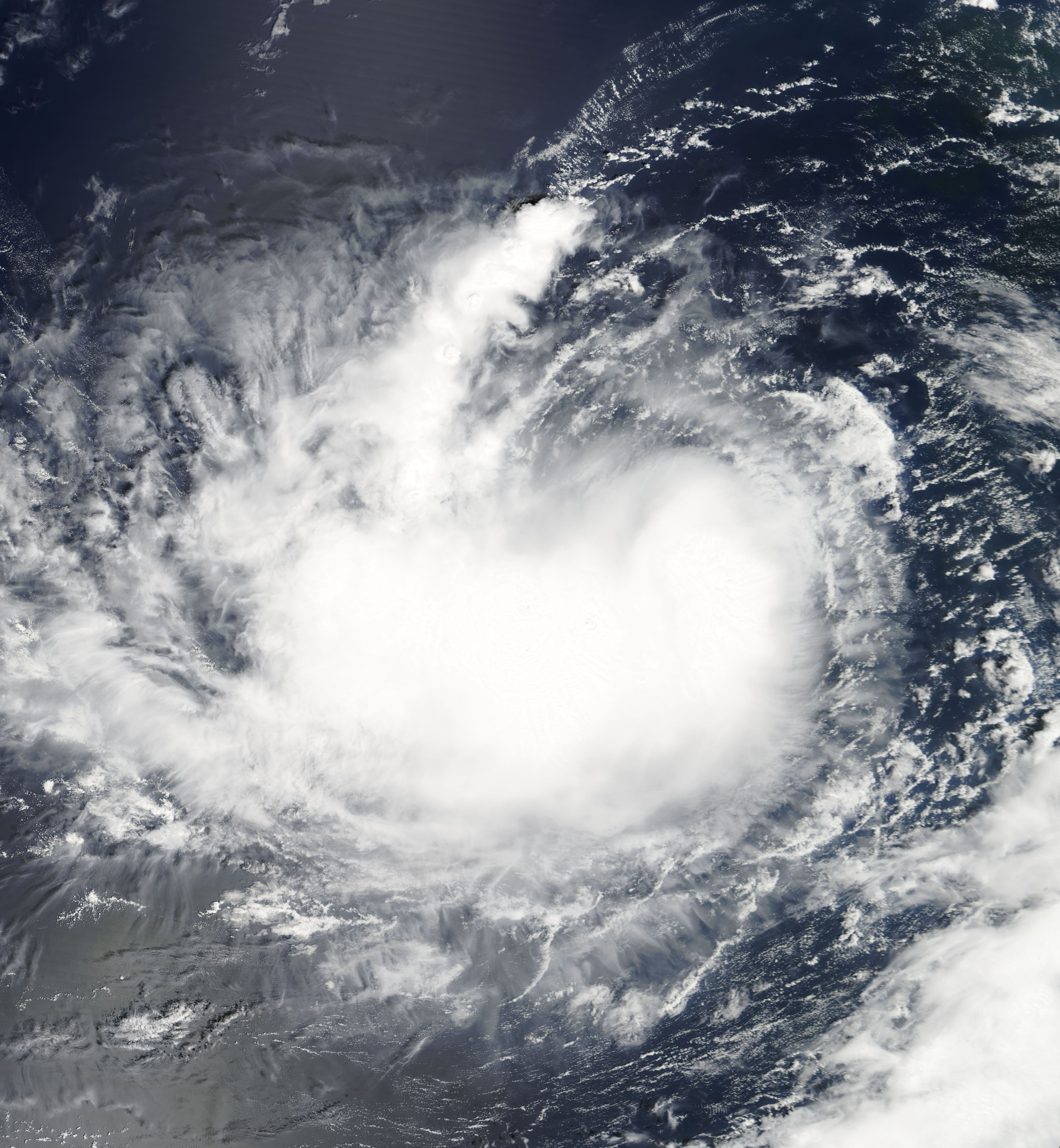
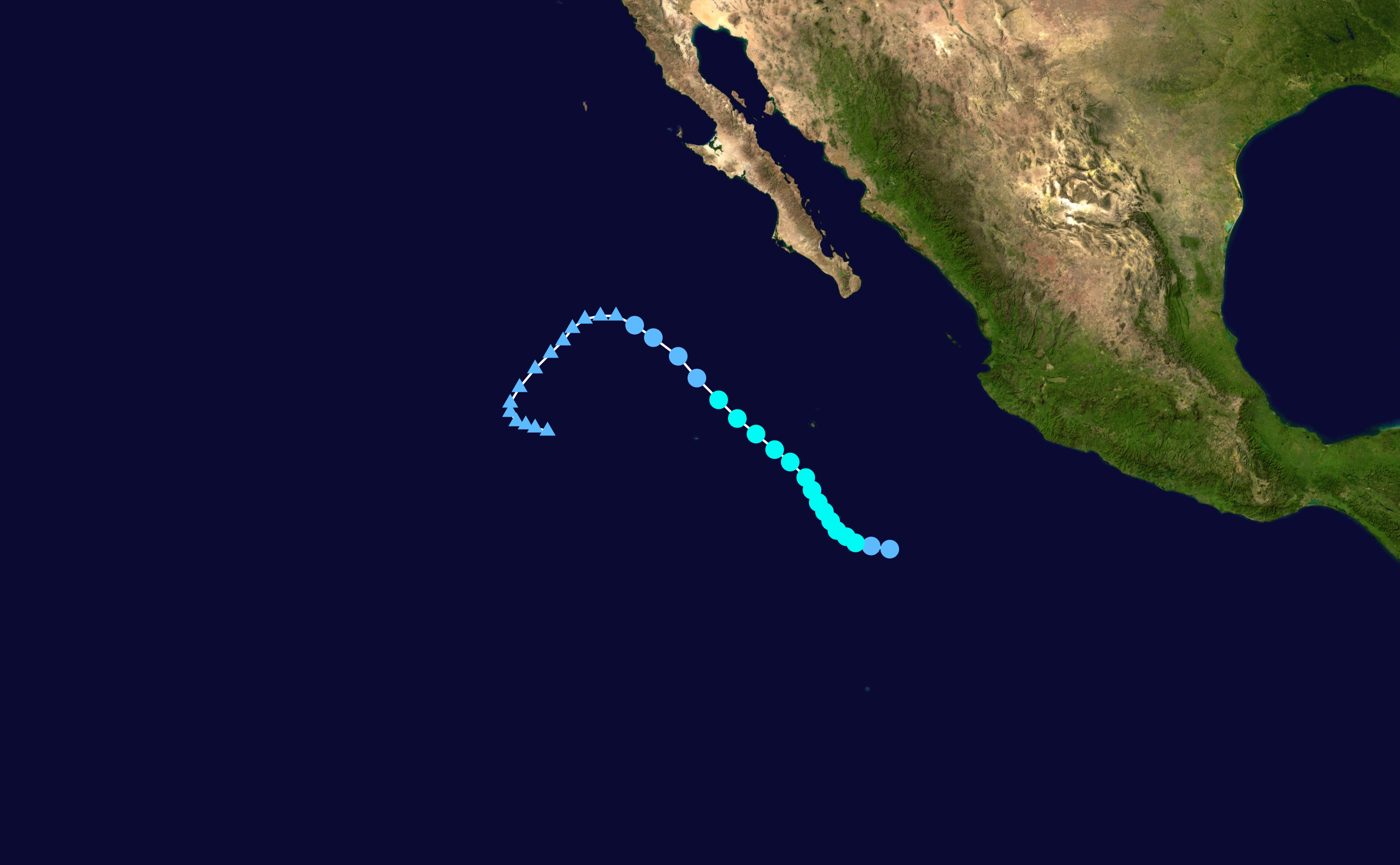
- Duration: September 23 – September 27
- Peak intensity: 60 mph (95 km/h) (1-min); 997 mbar (hPa)

An area of disturbed weather formed south of Mexico on September 19, followed by the formation of a broad area of low pressure within the disturbance two days later. A few small vortices were observed within the broad low over subsequent days, one of which cled to the formation of a tropical depression by 00:00 UTC on September 23. On a west-northwest course, the depression intensified into Tropical Storm Norma twelve hours later and ultimately attained peak winds of 60 mph (97 km/h) by 18:00 UTC on September 24 as the circulation became centrally located within the convection and banding features developed. Norma turned northwest as easterly wind shear increased, causing it to weaken to a tropical depression by 18:00 UTC on September 26 and degenerate to a remnant low a day later. The low turned south and east, persisting for several days before dissipating on October 1.

=== Hurricane Otis ===
- Category 2 hurricane (SSHWS)
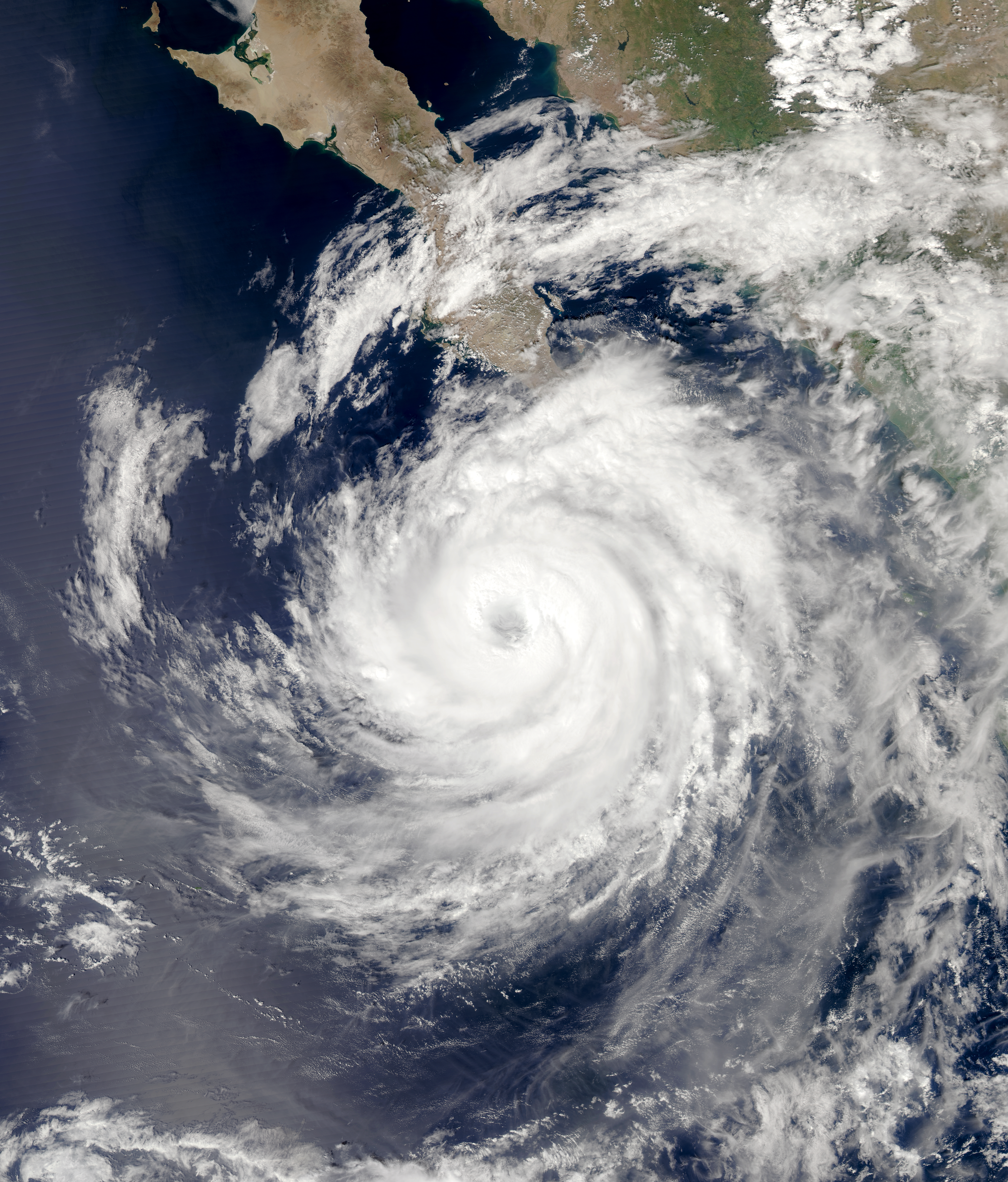
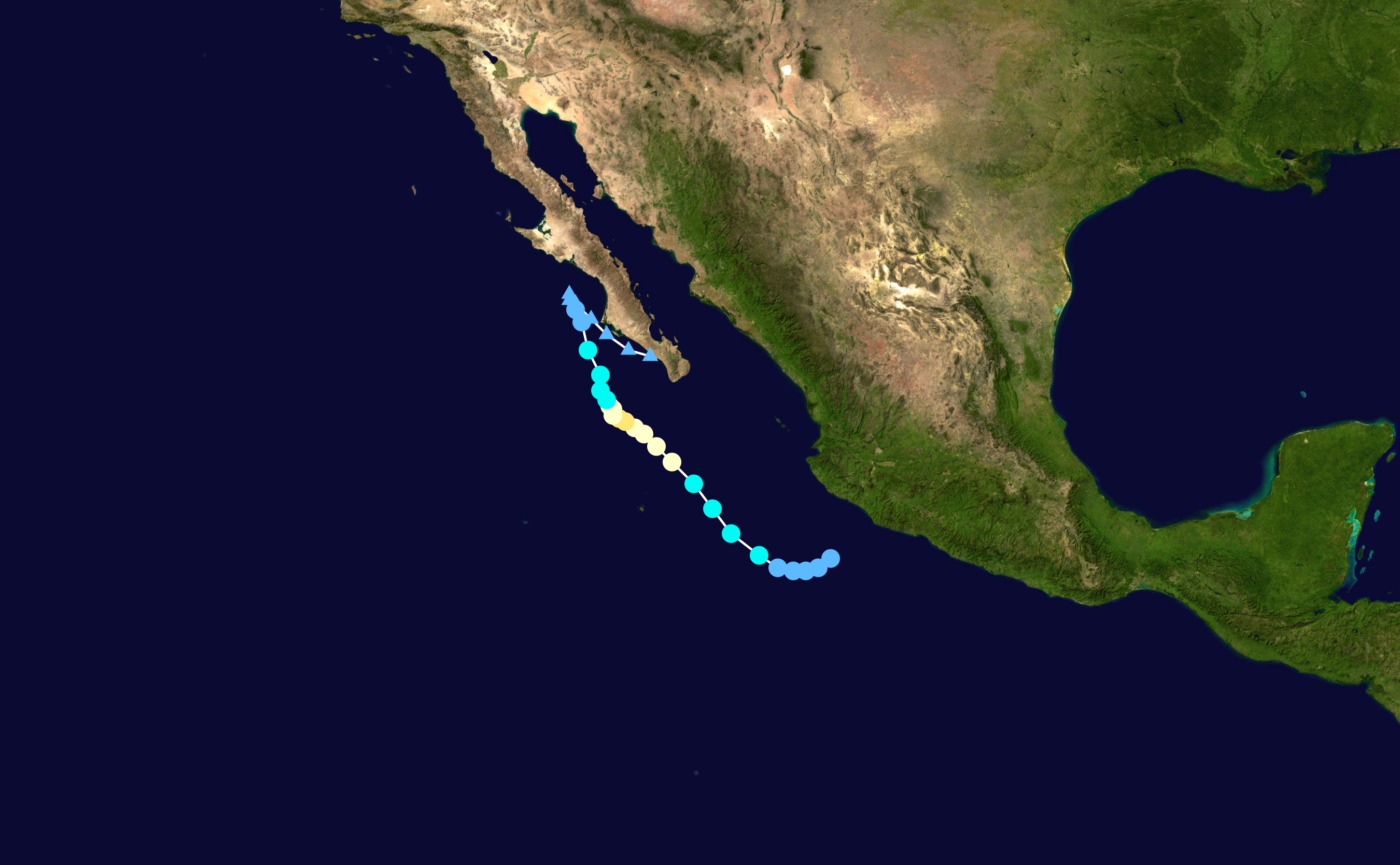
- Duration: September 28 – October 3
- Peak intensity: 105 mph (165 km/h) (1-min); 970 mbar (hPa)

A tropical wave moved off Africa on September 9, the northern half of which led to the formation of Hurricane Philippe. The southern portion of the wave continued westward, crossing into the eastern Pacific Ocean on September 22. As the wave entered a monsoon-like environment, convection increased on September 23, although proximity to land and wind shear prevented quick development. A tropical depression formed at 00:00 UTC on September 28, while located about 140 miles (230 km) to the south of Manzanillo, Mexico. It moved to the southwest at first before turning to the northwest. On September 29, the depression strengthened into Tropical Storm Otis. That evening, wind shear relented and conditions became more favorable for the storm's intensification. Convection wrapped almost fully around the center, and early on September 30, Otis was upgraded to a Category 1 hurricane on the Saffir–Simpson Hurricane Scale. A ragged eye feature developed, , and despite moving over cooler waters, Otis intensified to reach maximum sustained winds of 105 mph (165 km/h) early on October 1. The barometric pressure was estimated at 970 mbar (hPa; 28.64 inHg). Soon after, Otis weakened due to southwesterly wind shear and dry air. The cloud pattern associated with the hurricane deteriorated on October 2, and the center of circulation was separated from the convective activity. Otis weakened to a tropical storm and drifted erratically toward the north-northwest as a result of weak steering currents. Over increasingly cold waters, the cyclone further weakened to a depression on October 3 and consisted of a small swirl of low-level clouds. It became a remnant low pressure area the next day. The system abruptly turned southeastward and drifted parallel to the coast of the Baja California Peninsula until dissipating on October 5.

The Mexican government issued hurricane warnings for the west coast of the Baja California peninsula from Agua Blanca to San Andresito. At least 900 families evacuated their homes. Five communities in Mexico, including Cabo San Lucas, declared a state of emergency. The port in Cabo San Lucas was closed due to the storm's threat. At Cabo San Lucas, an automated weather station recorded a wind gust to 63 mph (101 km/h) on September 30, with sustained winds of 49 mph (79 km/h). There, periods of heavy rainfall mixed with fair skies as the storm passed. The storm caused flooding in parts of the southern Baja California peninsula.

=== Tropical Depression Sixteen-E ===
- Tropical depression (SSHWS)
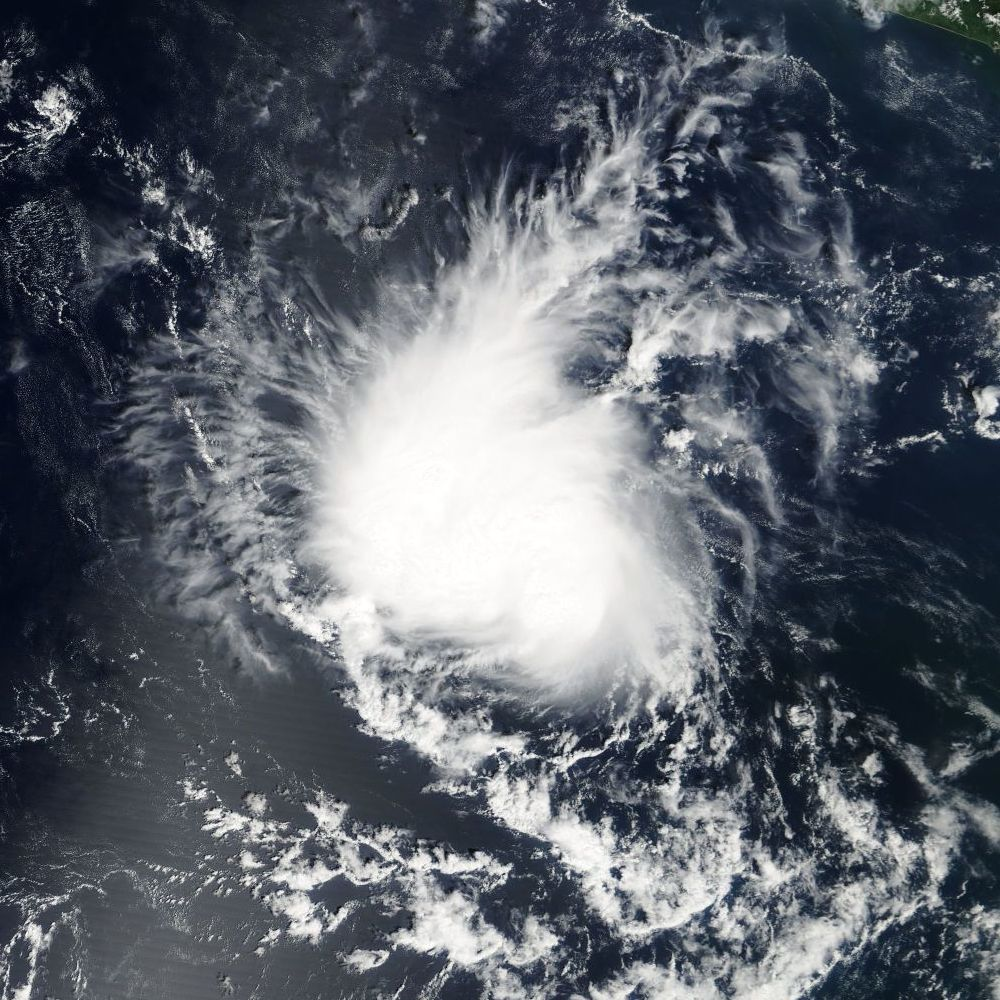
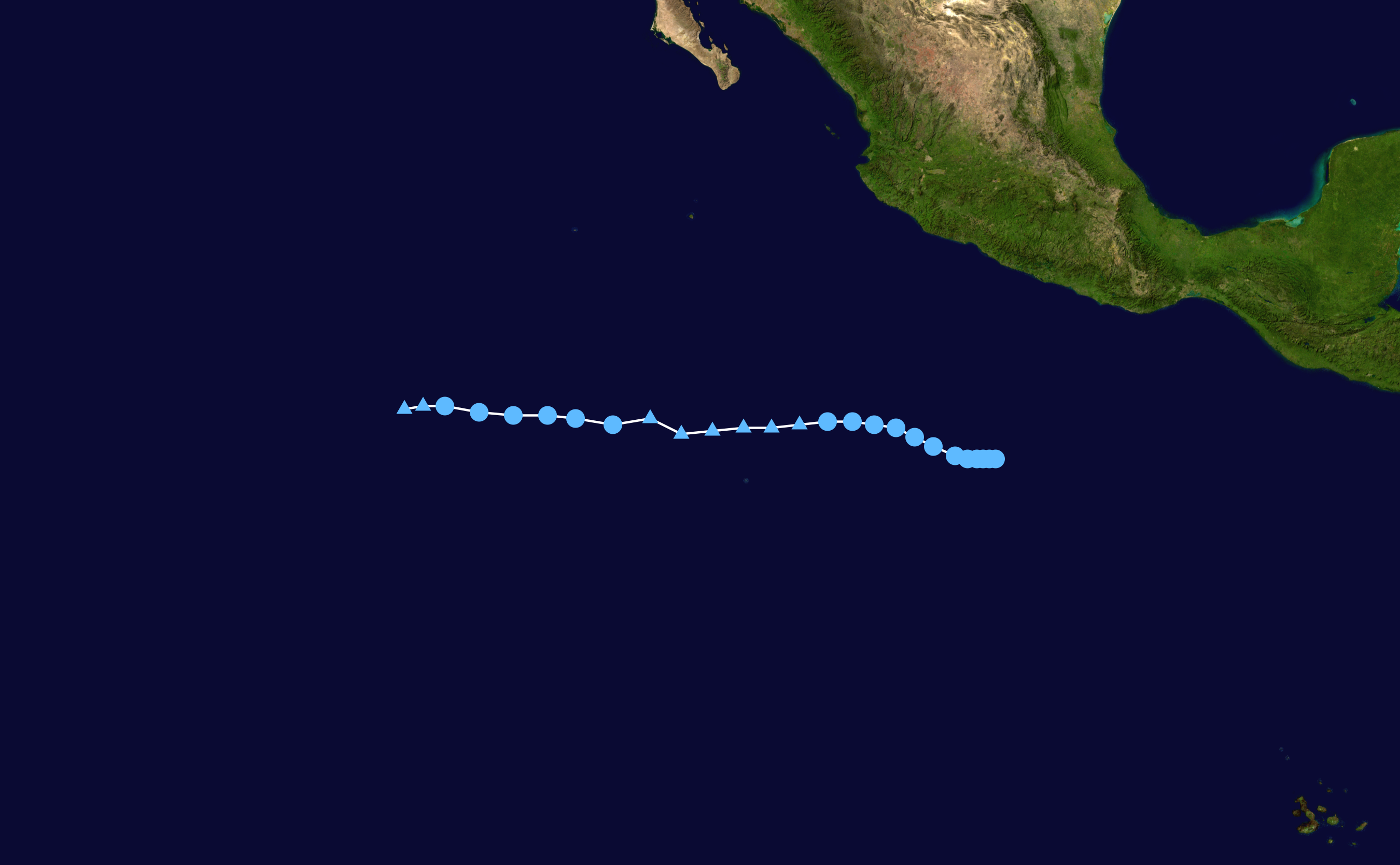
- Duration: October 15 – October 20
- Peak intensity: 35 mph (55 km/h) (1-min); 1005 mbar (hPa)

A tropical depression developed from a tropical wave that emerged off Africa on September 28. The wave entered the eastern Pacific over two weeks later, still embedded within the ITCZ. Deep convection and a better defined circulation became established as the system detached from the feature, leading to the formation of a tropical depression by 00:00 UTC on October 15. Steered on the south side of the Mexican subtropical ridge, the depression organized as extremely deep convection burst over its center; this led to the formation of an eye-like feature on microwave imagery, and it is possible the depression briefly attained tropical storm intensity. Shortly thereafter, however, easterly wind shear exposed the low-level center, and the depression degenerated to a remnant low by 00:00 UTC on October 18.

The remnant low continued westward, now steered by low-level easterly flow across the basin. Early on October 19, deep convection began to reform near the circulation, leading to the re-designation of a tropical depression by 12:00 UTC that day. Like its previous incarnation, however, a combination of dry air and southeasterly wind shear prevented the cyclone from intensifying to tropical storm status, with only a few curved band in its northern semicircle. Steady weakening occurred until the depression degenerated to a remnant low for a second time around 00:00 UTC on October 21. The remnant low turned southwestward before becoming reabsorbed into the ITCZ well southwest of the Baja California peninsula twelve hours later.

== Storm names ==
The following list of names was used for named storms that formed in the North Pacific Ocean east of 140°W during 2005. This was the same list used for the 1999 season. No names were retired from this list by the World Meteorological Organization following the season, and it was used again for the 2011 season.

- Adrian
- Beatriz
- Calvin
- Dora
- Eugene
- Fernanda
- Greg
- Hilary
- Irwin
- Jova *
- Kenneth *
- Lidia
- Max
- Norma
- Otis
- Pilar (unused)
- Ramon (unused)
- Selma (unused)
- Todd (unused)
- Veronica (unused)
- Wiley (unused)
- Xina (unused)
- York (unused)
- Zelda (unused)

For named storms that form in the North Pacific between 140°W and the International Date Line, the names come from a series of four rotating lists. Names are used one after the other without regard to year, and when the bottom of one list is reached, the next named storm receives the name at the top of the next list. No named storms formed within the region in 2005. Named storms in the table above that crossed into the area during the year are noted (*).

== Season effects ==
This is a table of all of the storms that formed in the 2005 Pacific hurricane season. It includes their name, duration, peak classification and intensities, areas affected, damage, and death totals. Deaths in parentheses are additional and indirect (an example of an indirect death would be a traffic accident), but were still related to that storm. Damage and deaths include totals while the storm was extratropical, a wave, or a low, and all of the damage figures are in 2005 USD.

Saffir–Simpson scale
TD	TS	C1	C2	C3	C4	C5

2005 Pacific hurricane season statistics
Storm name	Dates active	Storm category at peak intensity	Max 1-min wind mph (km/h)	Min. press. (mbar)	Areas affected	Damage (US$)	Deaths	Ref(s).
Adrian	May 17 – 21	Category 1 hurricane	80 (130)	982	Guatemala, El Salvador, Nicaragua, Honduras	$12 million	5	
Beatriz	June 21 – 24	Tropical storm	50 (85)	1000	None	None	None	
Calvin	June 26 – 29	Tropical storm	50 (85)	1000	Southwestern Mexico	Minimal	None	
Dora	July 4 – 6	Tropical storm	45 (75)	1002	Southwestern Mexico	Minimal	None	
Eugene	July 18 – 20	Tropical storm	70 (110)	989	Baja California Peninsula	Minimal	1	
One-C	August 3 – 4	Tropical depression	30 (45)	1008	None	None	None	
Fernanda	August 9 – 16	Category 1 hurricane	85 (140)	978	None	None	None	
Greg	August 11 – 15	Tropical storm	50 (85)	1000	None	None	None	
Hilary	August 19 – 25	Category 2 hurricane	105 (165)	970	None	None	None	
Irwin	August 25 – 28	Tropical storm	50 (85)	1000	Southwestern Mexico	None	None	
Jova	September 12 – 25	Category 3 hurricane	125 (205)	951	None	None	None	
Kenneth	September 14 – 30	Category 4 hurricane	130 (215)	947	Hawaii	None	None	
Lidia	September 17 – 19	Tropical storm	40 (65)	1005	None	None	None	
Max	September 18 – 22	Category 1 hurricane	85 (140)	981	None	None	None	
Norma	September 23 – 27	Tropical storm	60 (95)	997	None	None	None	
Otis	September 28–October 3	Category 2 hurricane	105 (165)	970	Western Mexico, Baja California Sur	Minimal	None	
Sixteen-E	October 15 – 20	Tropical depression	35 (55)	1005	None	None	None	
Season aggregates
17 systems	May 17 – October 20		130 (215)	947		$12 million	6	

== See also ==
- List of Pacific hurricanes
- Pacific hurricane season
- Tropical cyclones in 2005
- 2005 Atlantic hurricane season
- 2005 Pacific typhoon season
- 2005 North Indian Ocean cyclone season
- South-West Indian Ocean cyclone seasons: 2004–05, 2005–06
- Australian region cyclone seasons: 2004–05, 2005–06
- South Pacific cyclone seasons: 2004–05, 2005–06
