= Hurricane Adrian (2005) =

Category 1 Pacific hurricane in 2005

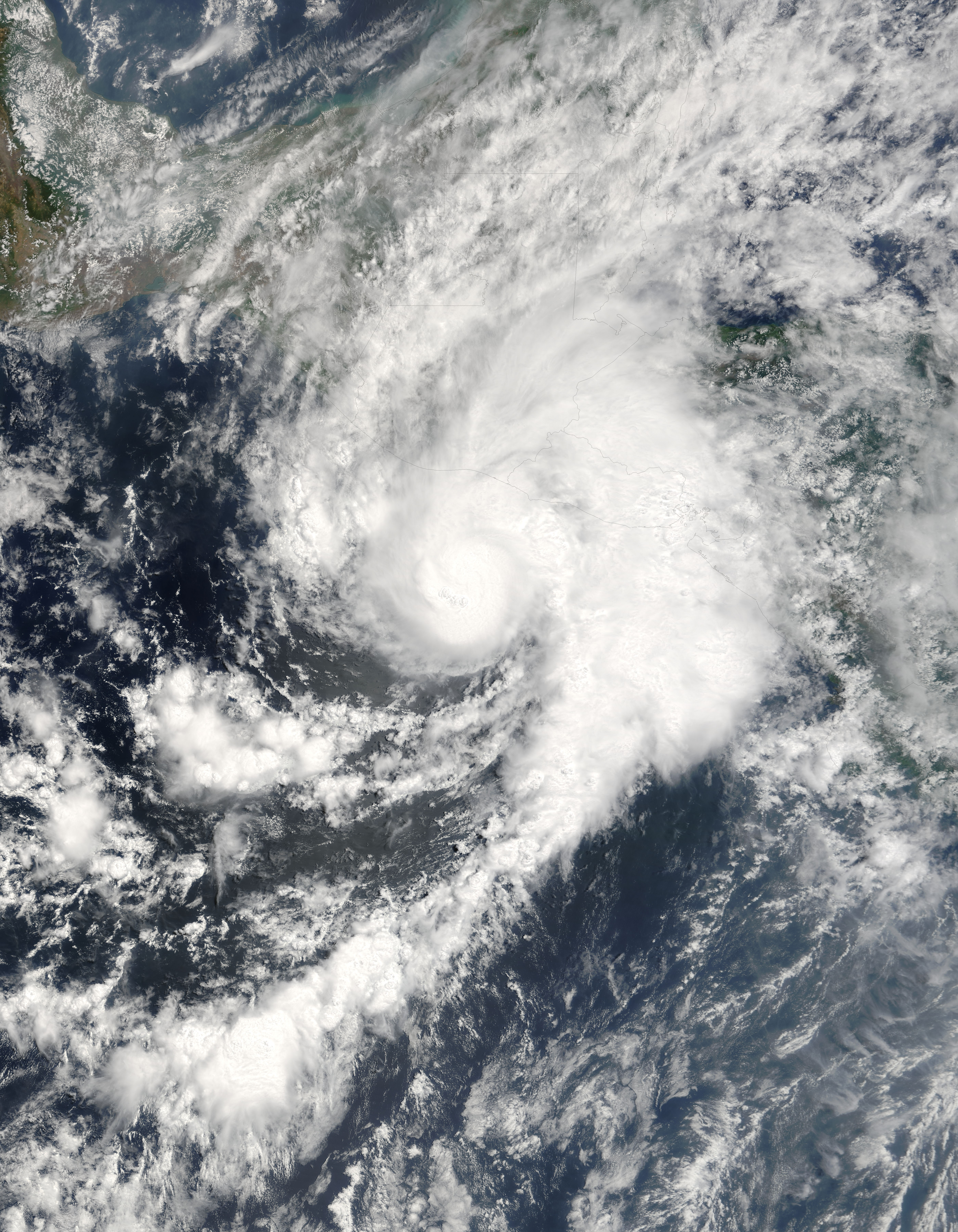
- Adrian near peak intensity on May 19

Meteorological history
- Formed: May 17, 2005
- Dissipated: May 21, 2005

Category 1 hurricane
- 1-minute sustained (SSHWS/NWS)
- Highest winds: 80 mph (130 km/h)
- Lowest pressure: 982 mbar (hPa); 29.00 inHg

Overall effects
- Fatalities: 5
- Damage: $12 million
- Areas affected: Guatemala, El Salvador, Nicaragua, Honduras
- IBTrACS
- Part of the 2005 Pacific hurricane season

Hurricane Adrian was an early season hurricane which took an unusual southwest to northeast track, bringing it closer to El Salvador than any other hurricane since reliable records began in 1949. The first storm of the 2005 Pacific hurricane season, Adrian developed on May 17, just two days after the official start of the season, several hundred miles south-southeast of Mexico. Tracking in an atypical northwestward direction, the storm gradually intensified. On May 19, the storm reached its peak strength as a minimal hurricane with winds of 80 mph (130 km/h). Not long after reaching this intensity, the storm abruptly weakened. By the morning of May 20, the system had weakened to a minimal tropical storm and turned due west. Later that day, the storm made landfall along the Gulf of Fonseca in Honduras before dissipating several hours later.

== Meteorological history ==
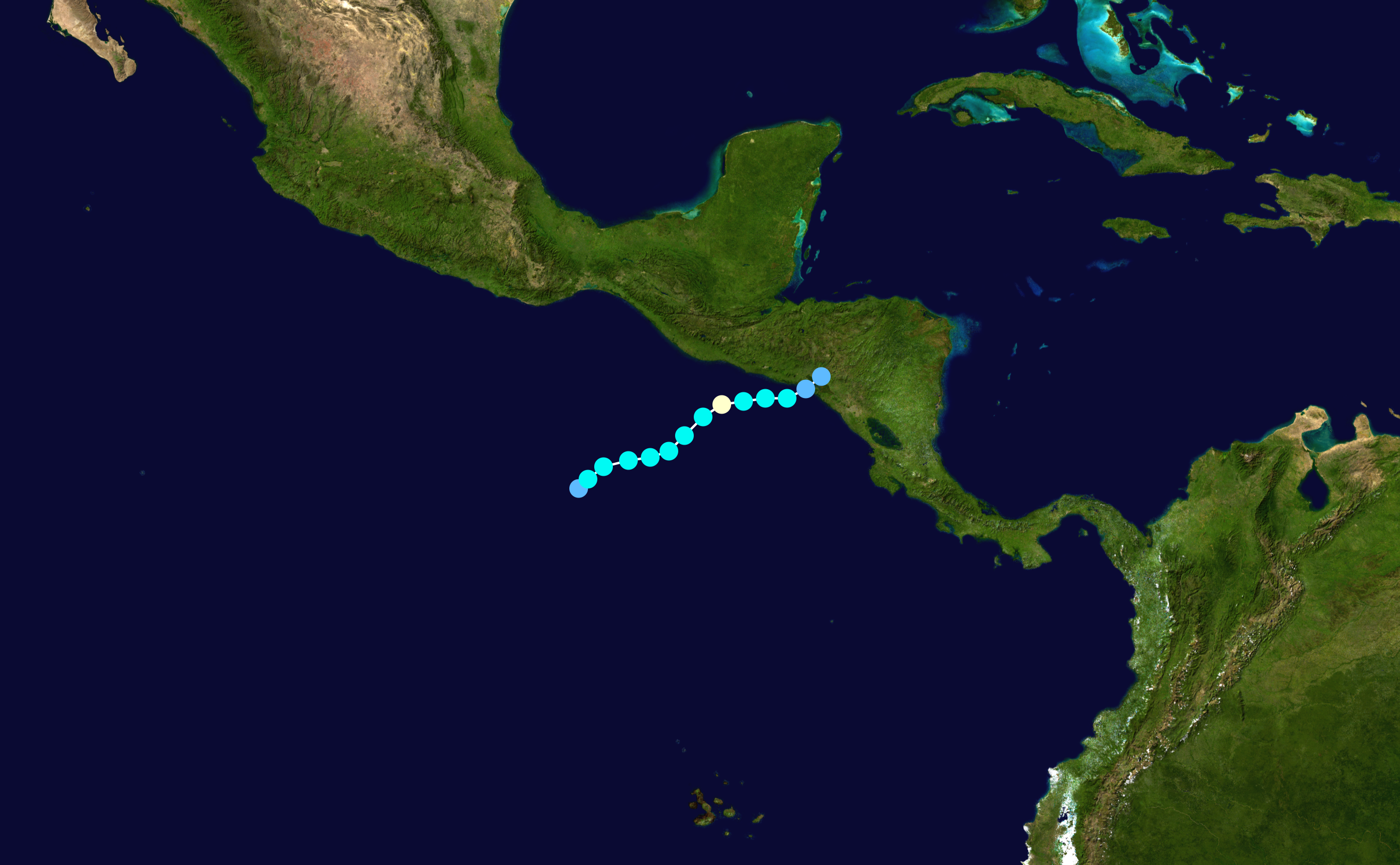
Map plotting the storm's track and intensity, according to the Saffir–Simpson scale Map key Saffir–Simpson scale Tropical depression (≤38 mph, ≤62 km/h) Tropical storm (39–73 mph, 63–118 km/h) Category 1 (74–95 mph, 119–153 km/h) Category 2 (96–110 mph, 154–177 km/h) Category 3 (111–129 mph, 178–208 km/h) Category 4 (130–156 mph, 209–251 km/h) Category 5 (≥157 mph, ≥252 km/h) Unknown Storm type Tropical cyclone Subtropical cyclone Extratropical cyclone, remnant low, tropical disturbance, or monsoon depression

Hurricane Adrian originated from a tropical wave that moved off the western coast of Africa, near the Cape Verde Islands in early May 2005. Between May 10 and 14, several areas of disturbed weather moved across Central America, contributing to the development of a broad area of low pressure about 520 mi (835 km) south-southeast of Acapulco, Mexico. On May 15, another tropical wave interacted with the low, resulting in the consolidation of the system. The following day, the developing low was nearly stationary as convection increased. Around 11:00 am PDT (1800 UTC) on May 17, the National Hurricane Center (NHC) estimated that the system developed into a tropical depression, the first of the 2005 Pacific hurricane season. Upon forming, the depression was situated just south of 10°N, making it the 40th known tropical cyclone to do so since 1949. Unlike most storms in the eastern Pacific, Tropical Depression One-E tracked towards the northwest in response to a trough over Mexico. Tropical cyclone forecast models at the time anticipated intensification as conditions ahead of the system favored tropical cyclone development. Initially, the system moved at a slow pace of 5 mph (8.0 km/h); however this later increased to 9 mph (14 km/h). Within six hours of being declared a depression, the cyclone was classified as Tropical Storm Adrian.

Over the following days, gradual strengthening took place as Adrian moved through a region of moderate wind shear. By May 18, deep convection consolidated around the center of circulation and feeder bands developed along the periphery of the storm. Warm waters, around 30 °C (86 °F), ahead of the storm would allow for further strengthening despite wind shear and interaction with the high terrain of Central America. Additionally, some forecasts predicted that Adrian would survive the passage of Central America and enter the Caribbean, possibly becoming the third known storm to cross from the eastern Pacific into the Atlantic basin. By May 19, the storm became relatively disorganized and Adrian only maintained a small area of convection around its center. However, within hours of this disorganization, the system rapidly consolidated and satellite imagery depicted the precursor to an eye forming. Following this, Adrian intensified to a minimal hurricane before attaining its peak intensity around 10:00 am PDT (1700 UTC) on May 19. At this time, the storm was situated about 85 mi (140 km) and had sustained winds of 80 mph (130 km/h) and a barometric pressure of 982 mbar (hPa; 29 inHg).

Not long after becoming a hurricane, Adrian suddenly succumbed to persistent wind shear off the coast of El Salvador. Operationally, this weakening was not noticed by the NHC, leading to their assessment of the storm making landfall in El Salvador around 11:00 pm PDT (0600 UTC on May 20) as a Category 1 hurricane on the Saffir–Simpson Hurricane Scale. In post-storm analysis, it was determined that the center of Adrian never actually crossed the coastline of El Salvador. Rather, convection associated with the system was sheared northward away from the center of circulation. Meteorologists at the NHC stated that Adrian's near-parallel track along the coast of El Salvador contributed to its rapid weakening as well as keeping the low offshore. Later on May 20, the system weakened to a tropical depression and made landfall in Honduras, along the pacific coast, around 1:00 pm PDT (2100 UTC) with winds of 25 mph (35 km/h). Several hours later, Adrian dissipated over the mountains of Central America.

== Preparations ==
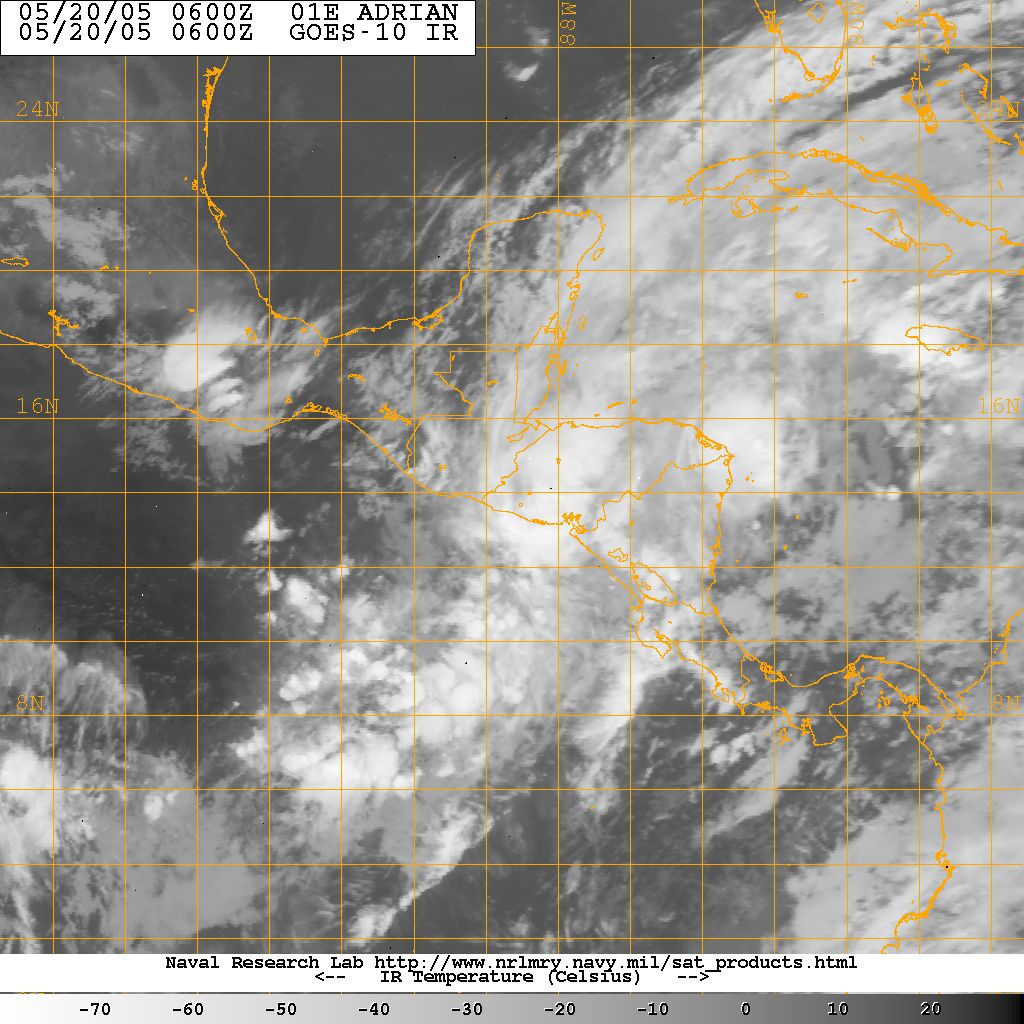
Tropical Depression Adrian several hours before landfall in Honduras on May 20

In response to the approaching hurricane, officials in El Salvador initiated the evacuations of about 3,500 families throughout 13 municipalities. Public facilities, as precautionary measures, were closed. The local governments and citizens were mindful of the damages caused to the region by other hurricanes, namely the 9,000 deaths caused by Hurricane Mitch in 1998. According to President Antonio Saca, roughly 23,000 people evacuated by the storm's arrival. In fears of significant damage, a state of emergency was declared for the entire country, home to roughly 6.5 million people.

In nearby Honduras, officials closed schools and public workers were given a half day as a precautionary measure. Small-scale evacuations also took place in parts of Guatemala and Nicaragua. Guatemala also declared a state of maximum alert as heavy rains from Adrian were expected to trigger flooding. Shelters were set up across the country to house roughly 400,000 people at-risk from the storm.

== Impact ==
Adrian had minor effects in Honduras; only a few poorly constructed building were destroyed and minor floods were reported and there were no known fatalities associated with the storm.

In El Salvador, rains from Adrian led to numerous landslides and flash floods, mainly along coastal areas. Fallen trees were reported throughout the country. The floods prompted officials to shut down roads to keep people out of harm's way. Heavy rains up to 16.4 inches (418.6 mm) caused several landslides that damaged roads. Two deaths took place, one due to a plane crash caused by strong winds, the other caused by flooding. In all, damages in El Salvador totaled to $12 million (2005 USD; $19.8 million 2025 USD).

In Guatemala, two people were killed after rains ahead of Adrian caused a ditch to cave in on them. One person was killed due to flooding in Nicaragua.

== See also ==
- Timeline of the 2005 Pacific hurricane season
