= Timeline of the 2005 Pacific hurricane season =

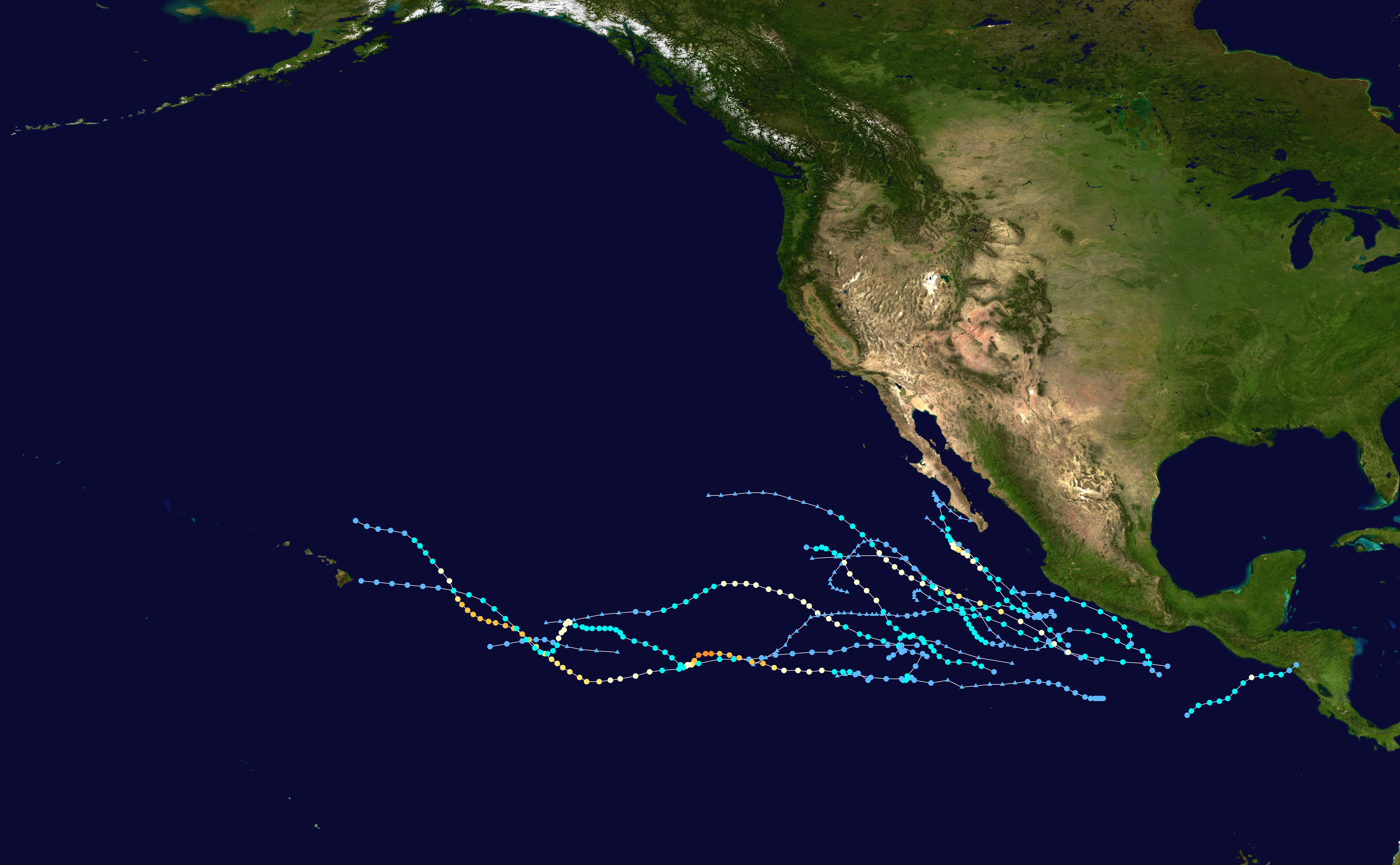
- Season summary map

Season boundaries
- First system formed: May 17, 2005
- Last system dissipated: October 20, 2005

Strongest system
- Name: Kenneth
- Maximum winds: 130 mph (215 km/h) (1-minute sustained)
- Lowest pressure: 947 mbar (hPa; 27.97 inHg)

Longest lasting system
- Name: Kenneth
- Duration: 16 days
Storm articles
- Hurricane Adrian (2005)

The 2005 Pacific hurricane season was the annual cycle of tropical cyclone formation over the Pacific Ocean north of the equator and east of the International Date Line (IDL). The season officially began on May 15 in the Eastern Pacific basin proper (east of 140°W) and June 1 in the Central Pacific basin (140°W to the IDL), and ended on November 30 in both areas. This is historically the period during which most tropical cyclogenesis occurs in these respective areas. The season's first system, Hurricane Adrian, developed on May 17; its last, Tropical Depression Sixteen-E, dissipated on October 20.

Activity during the 2005 season was near, to slightly below, average. (Note: During the period from 1991 to 2020, an average Pacific hurricane season generated fifteen tropical storms, eight hurricanes, and four major hurricanes.) A total of fifteen named tropical storms developed, with seven becoming hurricanes and two further strengthening into major hurricanes—Category 3 or higher on the five-level Saffir–Simpson scale. There were also two tropical depressions which did not attain tropical storm status, including the only tropical cyclone to form in the Central Pacific basin in 2005. However, two hurricanes—Jova and Kenneth—entered the Central Pacific basin from the east, with Jova reaching its peak intensity there. Adrian was the only tropical cyclone to make a direct landfall when it struck Honduras as a tropical depression in May. Tropical Storm Dora and Hurricane Otis brushed southwestern Mexico and the Baja California peninsula, respectively, while the remnants of Kenneth affected Hawaii just after the system dissipated.

This timeline documents tropical cyclone formations, strengthening, weakening, landfalls, and dissipations during the season. It includes information that was not released during the season, meaning that data from post-storm reviews by the National Hurricane Center and the Central Pacific Hurricane Center has been included.

The time stamp for each event is first stated using Coordinated Universal Time (UTC), the 24-hour clock where 00:00 = midnight UTC. The NHC uses both UTC and the time zone where the center of the tropical cyclone was then located. Prior to 2015, two time zones were utilized in the Eastern Pacific basin: Pacific for the Eastern Pacific, and Hawaii−Aleutian for the Central Pacific. In this timeline, the respective area time is included in parentheses. Additionally, figures for maximum sustained winds and position estimates are rounded to the nearest 5 units (miles, or kilometers), following NHC practice. Direct wind observations are rounded to the nearest whole number. Atmospheric pressures are listed to the nearest millibar and nearest hundredth of an inch of mercury.

== Timeline of events ==
=== May ===
May 15

- The 2005 Eastern Pacific hurricane season officially begins.

May 17

- 18:00 UTC (11:00 a.m. PDT) at 9.8°N 95.2°W – Tropical Depression One-E forms from a low-pressure area about 485 mi (780 km) west-southwest of El Salvador International Airport.

May 18

- 00:00 UTC (5:00 p.m. PDT, May 17) at 10.1°N 94.9°W – Tropical Depression One-E strengthens into Tropical Storm Adrian about 455 mi (730 km) west-southwest of El Salvador International Airport.

May 19

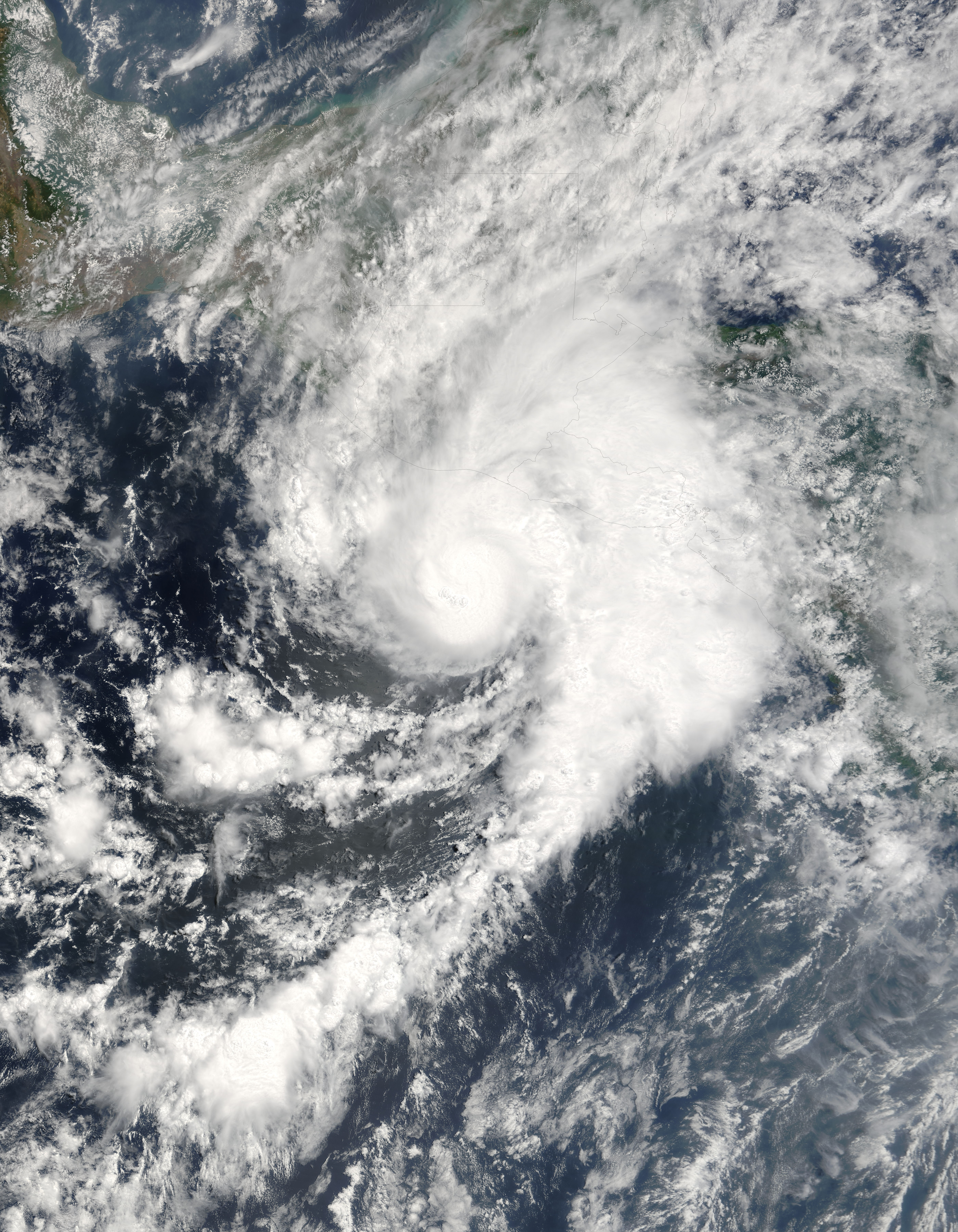
Hurricane Adrian off the coast of El Salvador at peak intensity on May 19

- 17:00 UTC (10:00 a.m. PDT) at 12.5°N 90.7°W – Tropical Storm Adrian strengthens into a Category 1 hurricane on the Saffir–Simpson scale about 125 mi (205 km) west-southwest of El Salvador International Airport. It simultaneously attains its peak intensity, with maximum sustained winds of 80 mph (130 km/h) and a minimum central pressure of 982 mbar (29.00 inHg). (Note: The figures for maximum sustained winds and position estimates are rounded to the nearest 5 units (knots, miles, or kilometers), following the convention used in the National Hurricane Center's operational products for each storm. All other units are rounded to the nearest digit.)

May 20

- 00:00 UTC (5:00 p.m. PDT, May 19) at 12.6°N 89.9°W – Hurricane Adrian weakens into a tropical storm about 80 mi (130 km) southwest of El Salvador International Airport.
- 18:00 UTC (11:00 a.m. PDT) at 13.0°N 87.9°W – Tropical Storm Adrian weakens into a tropical depression about 80 mi (130 km) east-southeast of El Salvador International Airport.
- 21:00 UTC (2:00 p.m. PDT) at 13.3°N 87.6°W – Tropical Depression Adrian makes landfall along the coast of the Gulf of Fonseca, or the Pacific coast of Honduras, with maximum sustained winds of 25 mph (35 km/h) and a central pressure of 1007 mbar (29.74 inHg).

May 21

- 00:00 UTC (5:00 p.m. PDT, May 20) at 13.4°N 87.4°W – Tropical Depression Adrian is last noted as a tropical cyclone just inland from the Gulf of Fonseca, dissipating shortly thereafter.

=== June ===
June 1

- The 2005 Central Pacific hurricane season officially begins.

June 21

- 18:00 UTC (11:00 a.m. PDT) at 13.6°N 101.7°W – Tropical Depression Two-E forms from an interaction between a tropical wave and a broad low-pressure area about 280 mi (455 km) south of Zihuatanejo, Guerrero.

June 22

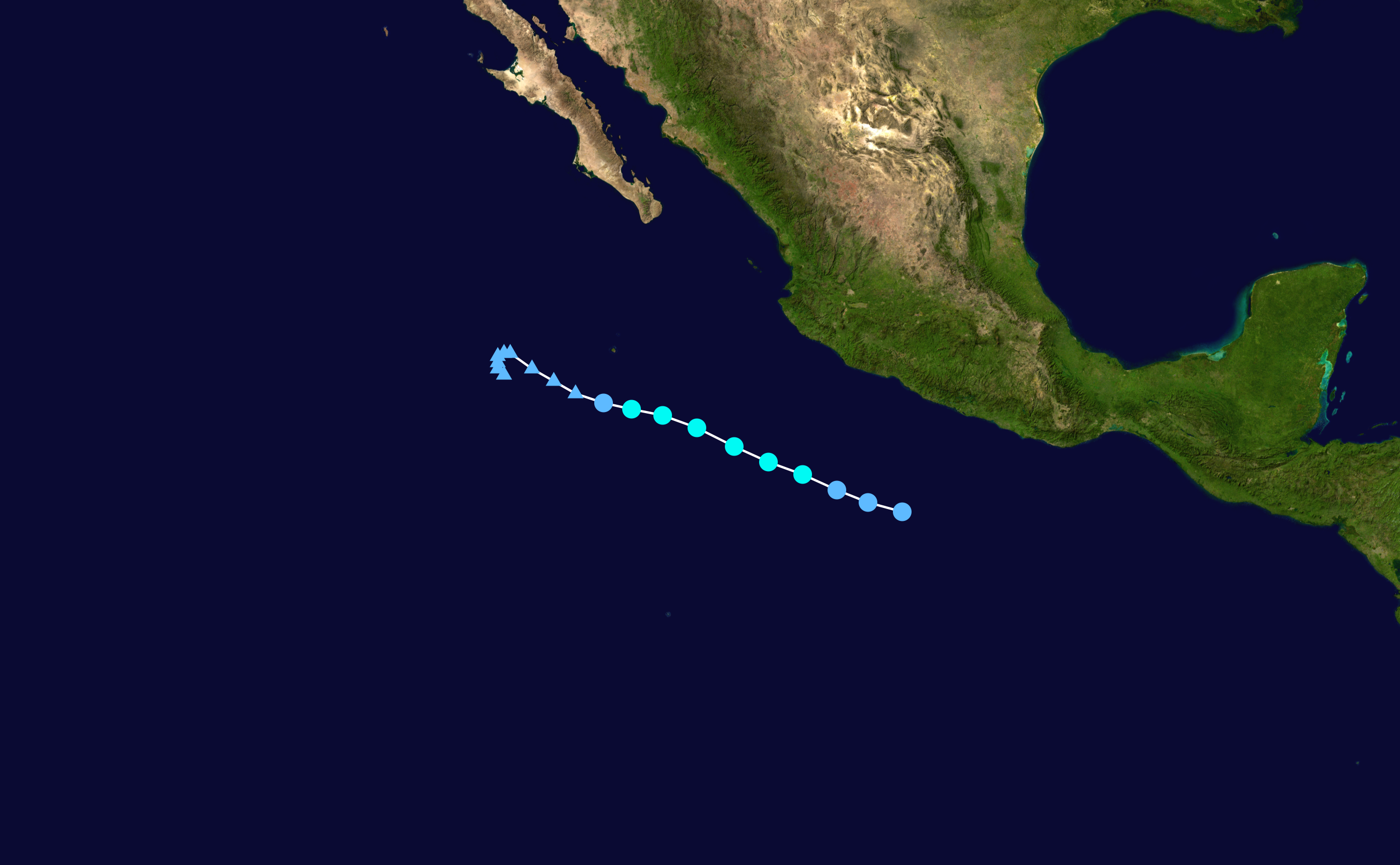
Storm path of Tropical Storm Beatriz

- 12:00 UTC (5:00 a.m. PDT) at 14.8°N 104.9°W – Tropical Depression Two-E strengthens into Tropical Storm Beatriz about 295 mi (470 km) south of Manzanillo, Colima.

June 23

- 00:00 UTC (5:00 p.m. PDT, June 22) at 15.7°N 107.1°W – Tropical Storm Beatriz attains its peak intensity, with maximum sustained winds of 50 mph (85 km/h) and a minimum central pressure of 1000 mbar (29.53 inHg), about 295 mi (470 km) southwest of Manzanillo.

June 24

- 00:00 UTC (5:00 p.m. PDT, June 23) at 17.1°N 111.3°W – Tropical Storm Beatriz weakens into a tropical depression about 410 mi (655 km) south of Cabo San Lucas, Baja California Sur.
- 06:00 UTC (11:00 p.m. PDT, June 23) at 17.4°N 112.2°W – Tropical Depression Beatriz degenerates into a remnant low about 405 mi (650 km) south-southwest of Cabo San Lucas, and later dissipates.

June 26

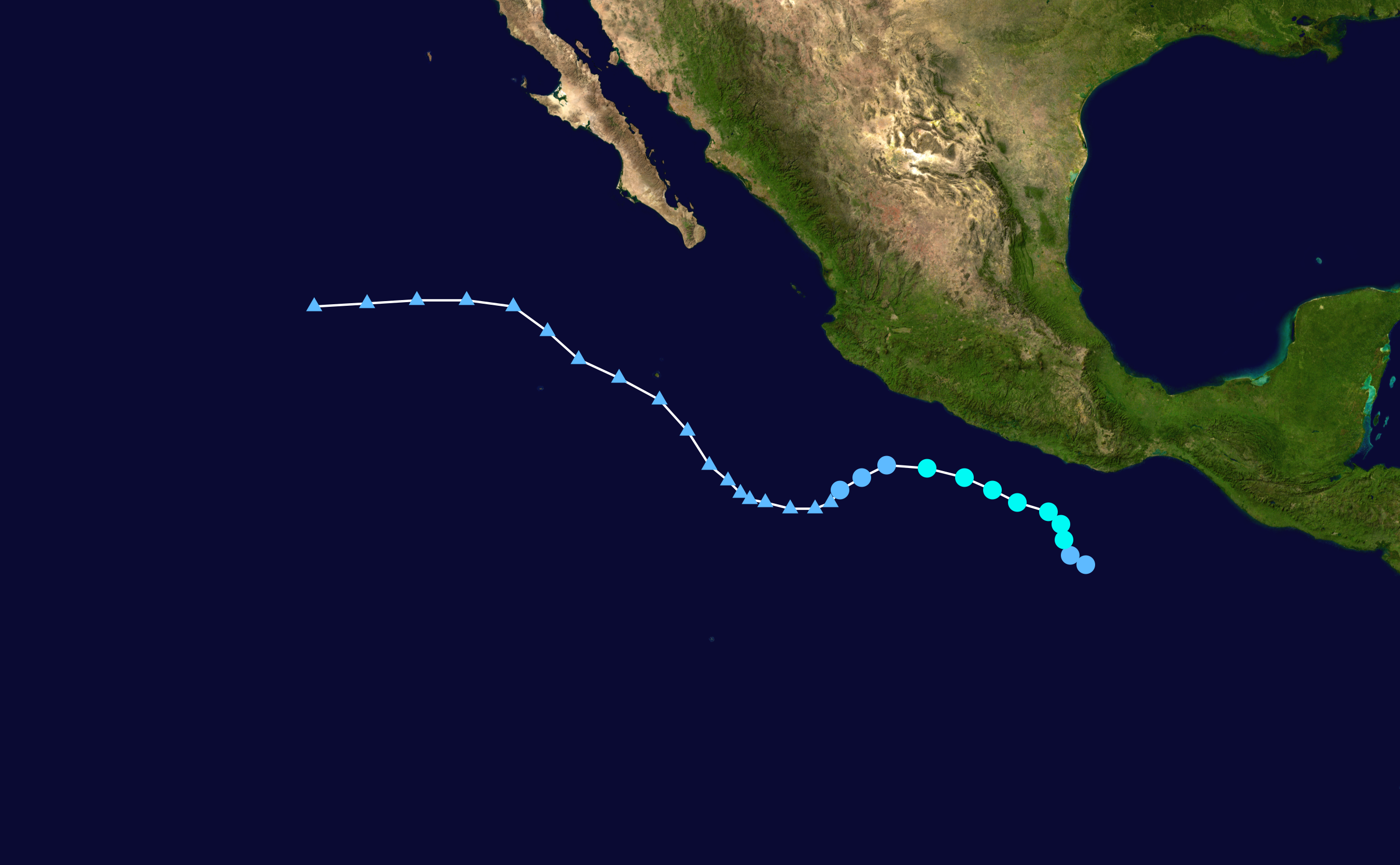
Storm path of Tropical Storm Calvin

- 06:00 UTC (11:00 p.m. PDT, June 25) at 12.7°N 97.2°W – Tropical Depression Three-E forms from a tropical wave about 340 mi (545 km) south-southeast of Acapulco, Guerrero.
- 18:00 UTC (11:00 a.m. PDT) at 13.5°N 97.9°W – Tropical Depression Three-E strengthens into Tropical Storm Calvin about 265 mi (425 km) south-southeast of Acapulco.

June 27

- 12:00 UTC (5:00 a.m. PDT) at 14.7°N 99.4°W – Tropical Storm Calvin attains its peak intensity, with maximum sustained winds of 50 mph (85 km/h) and a minimum central pressure of 1000 mbar (29.53 inHg), about 155 mi (250 km) south of Acapulco.

June 28

- 12:00 UTC (5:00 a.m. PDT) at 15.9°N 103.6°W – Tropical Storm Calvin weakens into a tropical depression about 255 mi (405 km) west-southwest of Acapulco.

June 29

- 06:00 UTC (11:00 p.m. PDT, June 28) at 14.7°N 105.4°W – Tropical Depression Calvin degenerates into a remant low about 395 mi (640 km) west-southwest of Acapulco, and later dissipates about 785 mi (1,260 km) west-southwest of Cabo San Lucas.

=== July ===
July 4

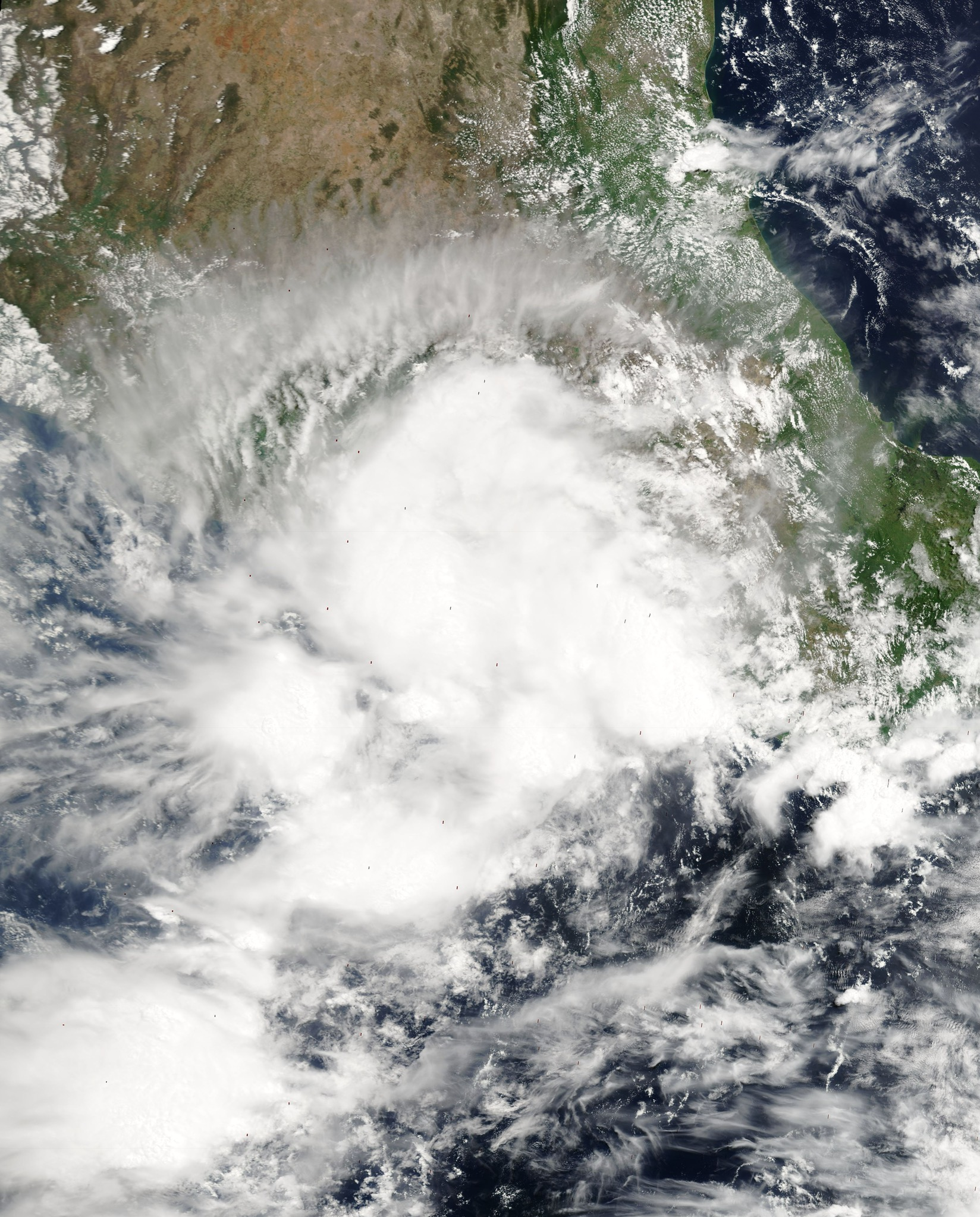
Tropical Storm Dora skirting the coast of Mexico near peak intensity on July 4

- 00:00 UTC (5:00 p.m. PDT, July 3) at 14.9°N 99.2°W – Tropical Depression Four-E forms from a tropical wave about 145 mi (230 km) south-southeast of Acapulco.
- 06:00 UTC (11:00 p.m. PDT, July 3) at 15.2°N 99.3°W – Tropical Depression Four-E strengthens into Tropical Storm Dora about 120 mi (195 km) south-southeast of Acapulco.
- 12:00 UTC (5:00 a.m. PDT) at 16.1°N 99.7°W – Tropical Storm Dora attains its peak intensity, with maximum sustained winds of 45 mph (75 km/h) and a minimum pressure of 1003 mbar (29.62 inHg), about 50 mi (85 km) south-southeast of Acapulco.

July 5

- 18:00 UTC (11:00 a.m. PDT) at 18.4°N 104.8°W – Tropical Storm Dora weakens into a tropical depression about 60 mi (95 km) southwest of Manzanillo.

July 6

- 12:00 UTC (5:00 a.m. PDT) at 18.6°N 107.4°W – Tropical Depression Dora degenerates into a remnant low about 200 mi (325 km) west of Manzanillo, and later dissipates.

July 18

- 06:00 UTC (11:00 p.m. PDT, July 17) at 14.8°N 103.7°W – A tropical depression forms from a tropical wave about 300 mi (480 km) south of Manzanillo.
- 12:00 UTC (5:00 a.m. PDT) at 15.2°N 104.3°W – The recently formed tropical depression strengthens into Tropical Storm Eugene about 265 mi (425 km) south of Manzanillo.

July 19

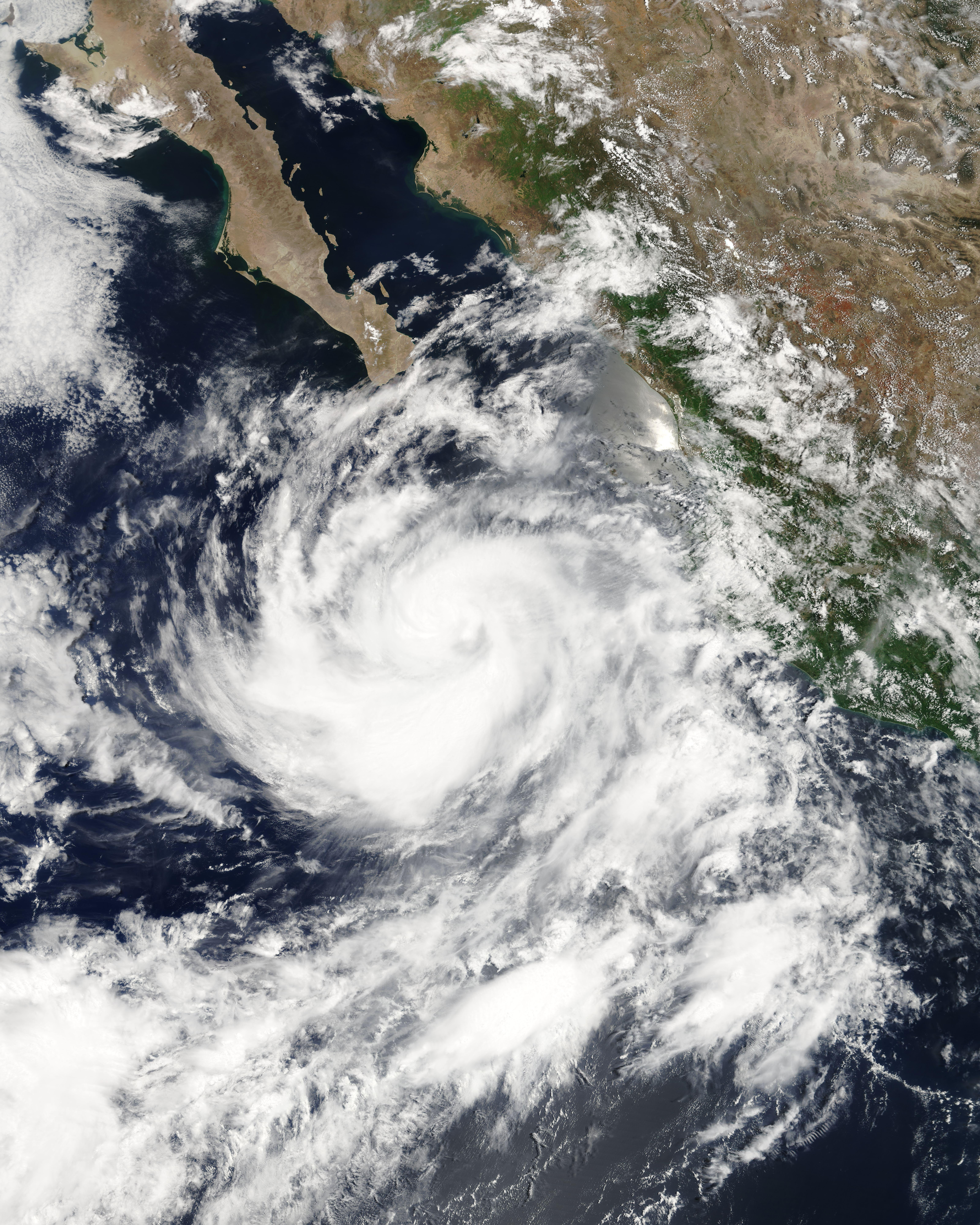
Tropical Storm Eugene near peak intensity on July 19

- 18:00 UTC (11:00 a.m. PDT) at 19.5°N 108.7°W – Tropical Storm Eugene attains its peak intensity, with maximum sustained winds of 70 mph (110 km/h) and a minimum central pressure of 989 mbar (29.21 inHg), about 245 mi (400 km) south-southeast of Cabo San Lucas.

July 20

- 12:00 UTC (5:00 a.m. PDT) at 21.5°N 110.9°W – Tropical Storm Eugene weakens into a tropical depression about 115 mi (185 km) south-southwest of Cabo San Lucas.

July 21

- 00:00 UTC (5:00 p.m. PDT, July 20) at 22.5°N 112.1°W – Tropical Depression Eugene degenerates into a remnant low about 140 mi (220 km) west of Cabo San Lucas, and later dissipates.

=== August ===
August 3

- 18:00 UTC (8:00 a.m. HST) at 15.0°N 140.5°W – Tropical Depression One-C forms from an area of unsettled weather about 920 mi (1,480 km) east-southeast of Hilo, Hawaii. It is already at its peak intensity, with maximum sustained winds of 30 mph (45 km/h) and a minimum central pressure of 1008 mbar (29.77 inHg).

August 5

- 00:00 UTC (2:00 p.m. HST, August 4) at 14.7°N 145.0°W – Tropical Depression One-C is last noted as a tropical cyclone about 750 mi (1,205 km) east-southeast of Hilo, dissipating shortly thereafter.

August 9

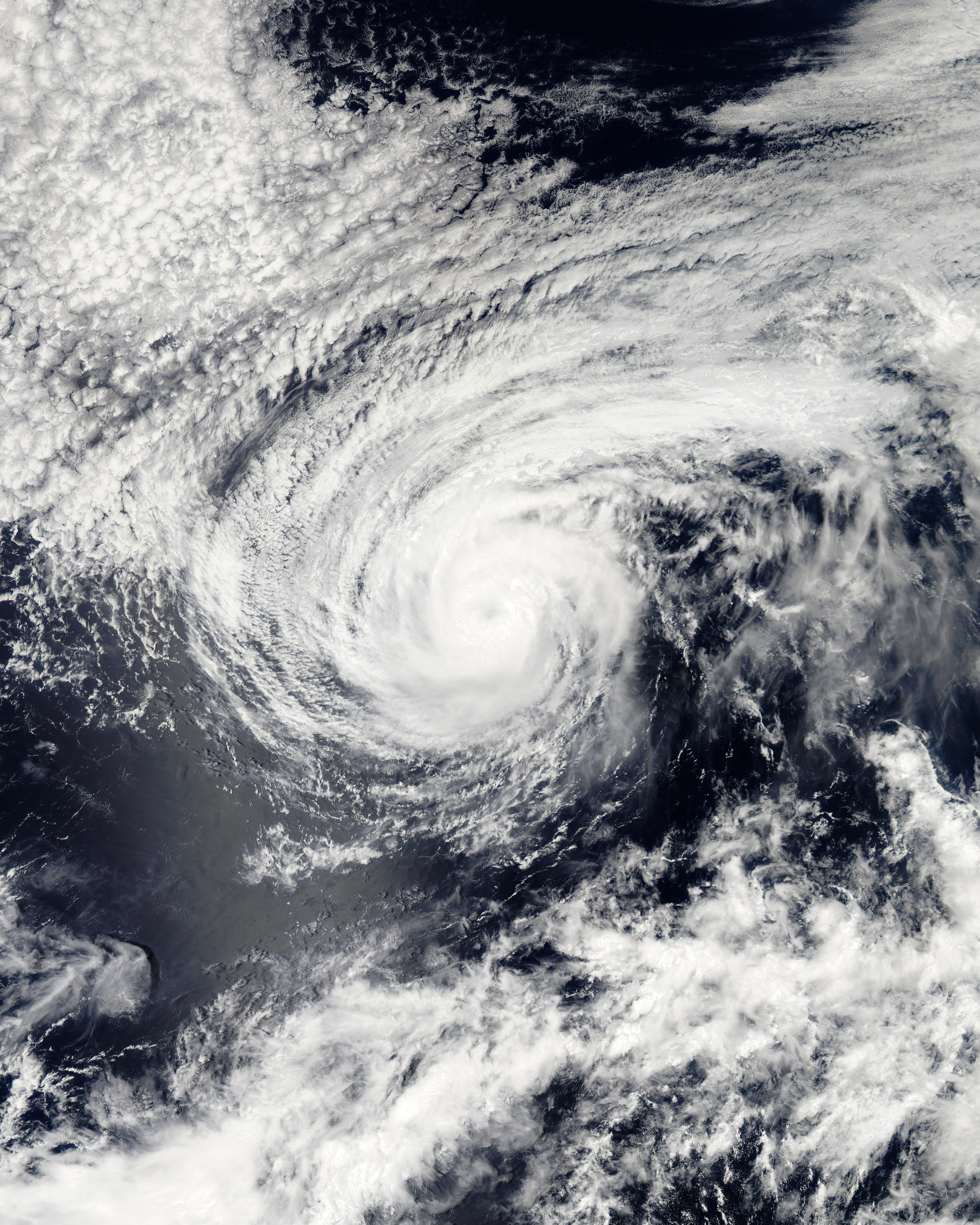
Hurricane Fernanda near peak intensity late on August 12

- 12:00 UTC (5:00 a.m. PDT) at 14.0°N 113.8°W – Tropical Depression Six-E forms from a tropical wave about 660 mi (1,065 km) south-southwest of Cabo San Lucas.

August 10

- 00:00 UTC (5:00 p.m. PDT, August 9) at 14.8°N 115.8°W – Tropical Depression Six-E strengthens into Tropical Storm Fernanda about 675 mi (1,085 km) southwest of Cabo San Lucas.

August 11

- 06:00 UTC (11:00 p.m. PDT, August 10) at 16.3°N 120.2°W – Tropical Storm Fernanda strengthens into a Category 1 hurricane about 805 mi (1,295 km) southwest of Cabo San Lucas.
- 06:00 UTC (11:00 p.m. PDT, August 10) at 12.9°N 109.0°W – Tropical Depression Seven-E forms from a tropical wave about 690 mi (1,110 km) south of Cabo San Lucas.
- 12:00 UTC (5:00 a.m. PDT) at 13.3°N 109.8°W – Tropical Depression Seven-E strengthens into Tropical Storm Greg about 660 mi (1,065 km) south of Cabo San Lucas.

August 12

- 00:00 UTC (5:00 p.m. PDT, August 11) at 13.6°N 111.5°W – Tropical Storm Greg attains its peak intensity, with maximum sustained winds of 50 mph (85 km/h) and a minimum central pressure of 1000 mbar (29.53 inHg), about 650 mi (1,045 km) south of Cabo San Lucas.
- 12:00 UTC (5:00 a.m. PDT) at 18.3°N 123.5°W – Hurricane Fernanda attains its peak intensity, with maximum sustained winds of 85 mph (140 km/h) and a minimum central pressure of 978 mbar (28.88 inHg), about 930 mi (1,500 km) west-southwest of Cabo San Lucas.

August 14

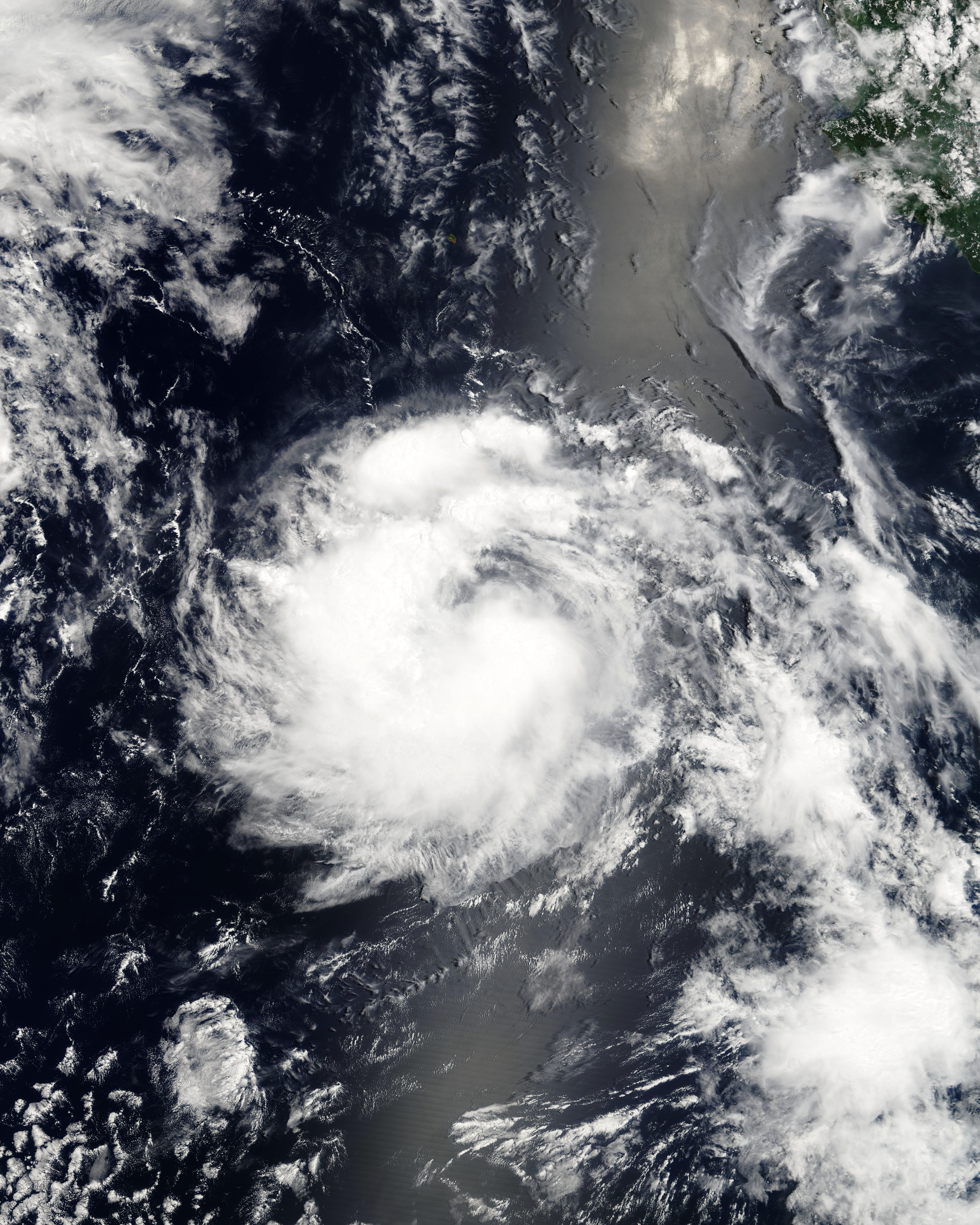
Tropical Storm Greg gaining strength late on August 11

- 06:00 UTC (11:00 p.m. PDT, August 13) at 19.0°N 129.0°W – Hurricane Fernanda weakens into a tropical storm about 1,255 mi (2,020 km) west-southwest of Cabo San Lucas.
- 18:00 UTC (11:00 a.m. PDT) at 14.5°N 115.7°W – Tropical Storm Greg weakens into a tropical depression about 690 mi (1,110 km) southwest of Cabo San Lucas.

August 15

- 18:00 UTC (11:00 a.m. PDT) at 17.1°N 133.7°W – Tropical Storm Fernanda weakens into a tropical depression about 1,590 mi (2,555 km) west-southwest of Cabo San Lucas.

August 16

- 00:00 UTC (5:00 p.m. PDT, August 15) at 13.5°N 116.6°W – Tropical Depression Greg degenerates into a remnant low about 775 mi (1,250 km) southwest of Cabo San Lucas, and later dissipates.
- 06:00 UTC (11:00 p.m. PDT, August 15) at 17.1°N 135.8°W – Tropical Depression Fernanda degenerates into a remnant low about 1,720 mi (2,770 km) west-southwest of Cabo San Lucas, and later dissipates.

August 19

- 18:00 UTC (11:00 a.m. PDT) at 13.3°N 96.6°W – Tropical Depression Eight-E forms from a tropical wave about 160 mi (260 km) south of Puerto Ángel, Oaxaca.

August 20

- 06:00 UTC (11:00 p.m. PDT, August 19) at 13.6°N 99.8°W – Tropical Depression Eight-E strengthens into Tropical Storm Hilary about 225 mi (360 km) south of Acapulco.

August 21

- 00:00 UTC (5:00 p.m. PDT, August 20) at 14.3°N 103.7°W – Tropical Storm Hilary strengthens into a Category 1 hurricane about 330 mi (530 km) south of Manzanillo.

August 22

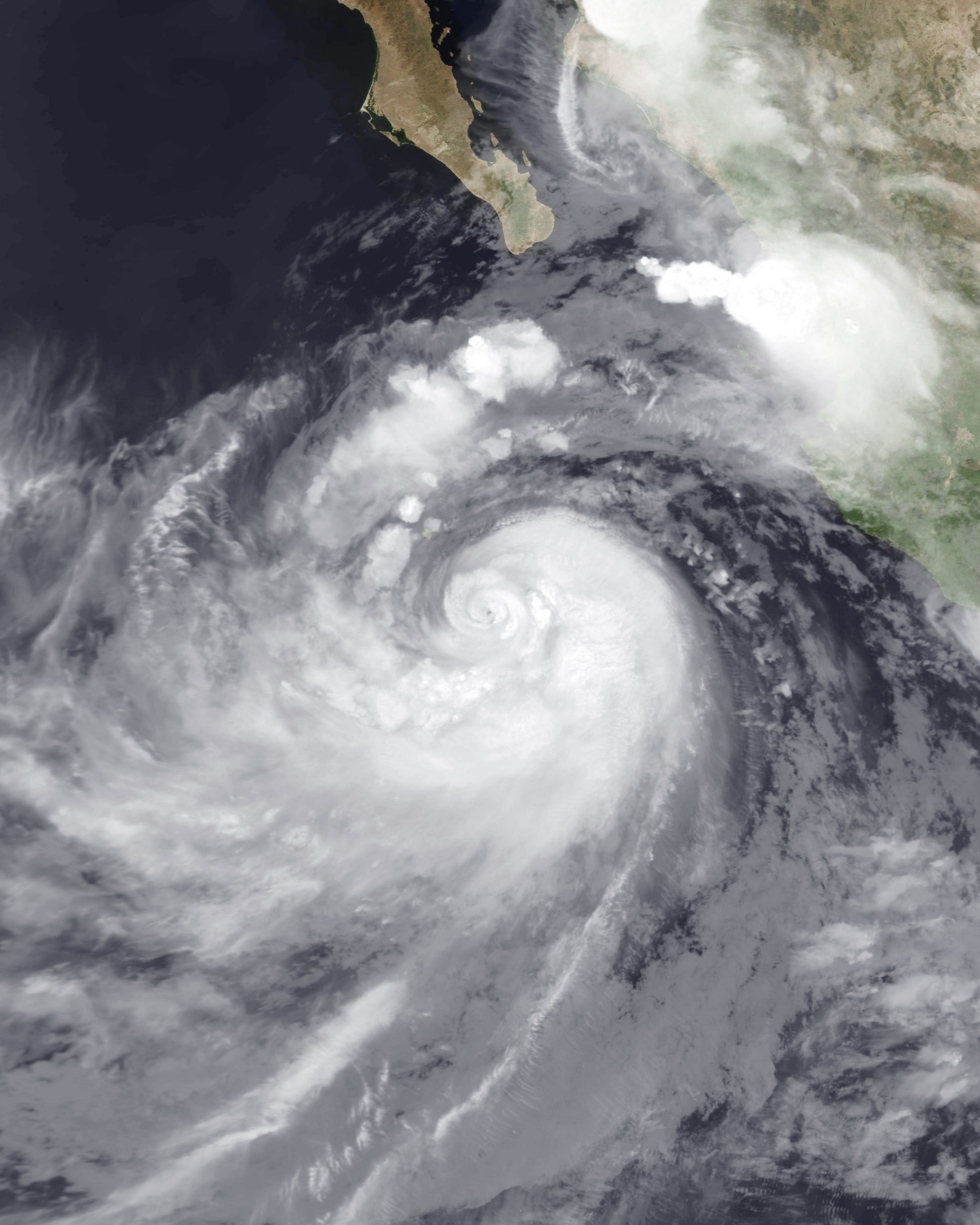
Hurricane Hilary near peak intensity early on August 22

- 00:00 UTC (5:00 p.m. PDT, August 21) at 17.2°N 108.5°W – Hurricane Hilary strengthens to Category 2 intensity about 305 mi (490 km) west-southwest of Manzanillo.
- 06:00 UTC (11:00 p.m. PDT, August 21) at 17.8°N 110.0°W – Hurricane Hilary attains its peak intensity, with maximum sustained winds of 105 mph (165 km/h) and a minimum central pressure of 970 mbar (28.64 inHg), about 350 mi (565 km) south of Cabo San Lucas.

August 23

- 00:00 UTC (5:00 p.m. PDT, August 22) at 18.9°N 113.2°W – Hurricane Hilary weakens to Category 1 intensity about 345 mi (555 km) southwest of Cabo San Lucas.

August 24

- 18:00 UTC (11:00 a.m. PDT) at 22.0°N 117.7°W – Hurricane Hilary weakens into a tropical storm about 495 mi (795 km) west of Cabo San Lucas.

August 25

- 12:00 UTC (5:00 a.m. PDT) at 16.9°N 104.7°W – Tropical Depression Nine-E forms from a tropical wave about 150 mi (240 km) south of Manzanillo.
- 18:00 UTC (11:00 a.m. PDT) at 24.3°N 120.7°W – Tropical Storm Hilary weakens into a tropical depression about 685 mi (1,100 km) west of Cabo San Lucas.

August 26

- 00:00 UTC (5:00 p.m. PDT, August 25) at 24.7°N 121.6°W – Tropical Depression Hilary degenerates into a remnant low about 750 mi (1,205 km) west of Cabo San Lucas, and later dissipates.
- 00:00 UTC (5:00 p.m. PDT, August 25) at 17.2°N 106.8°W – Tropical Depression Nine-E strengthens into Tropical Storm Irwin about 205 mi (335 km) southwest of Manzanillo.
- 12:00 UTC (5:00 a.m. PDT) at 17.7°N 108.7°W – Tropical Storm Irwin attains its peak intensity, with maximum sustained winds of 50 mph (85 km/h) and a minimum central pressure of 1000 mbar (29.53 inHg), about 300 mi (480 km) west-southwest of Manzanillo.

August 28

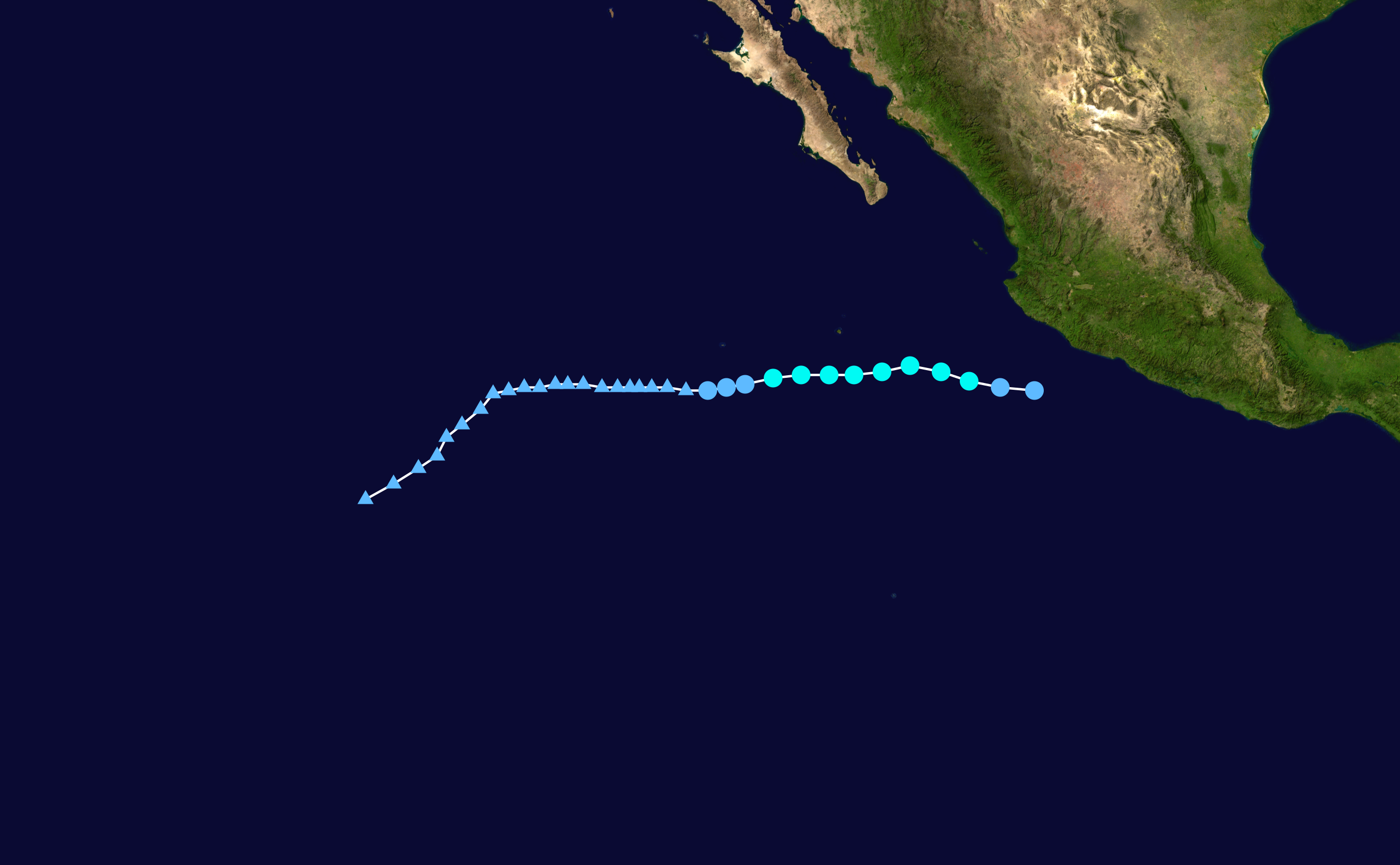
Storm path of Tropical Storm Irwin

- 00:00 UTC (5:00 p.m. PDT, August 27) at 17.1°N 114.0°W – Tropical Storm Irwin weakens into a tropical depression about 480 mi (770 km) southwest of Cabo San Lucas.
- 18:00 UTC (11:00 a.m. PDT) at 16.9°N 115.9°W – Tropical Depression Irwin degenerates into a remnant low about 565 mi (905 km) southwest of Cabo San Lucas, and later dissipates.

=== September ===
September 12

- 00:00 UTC (5:00 p.m. PDT, September 11) at 14.8°N 114.5°W – Tropical Depression Ten-E forms from a tropical wave about 635 mi (1,020 km) south-southwest of Cabo San Lucas.

September 14

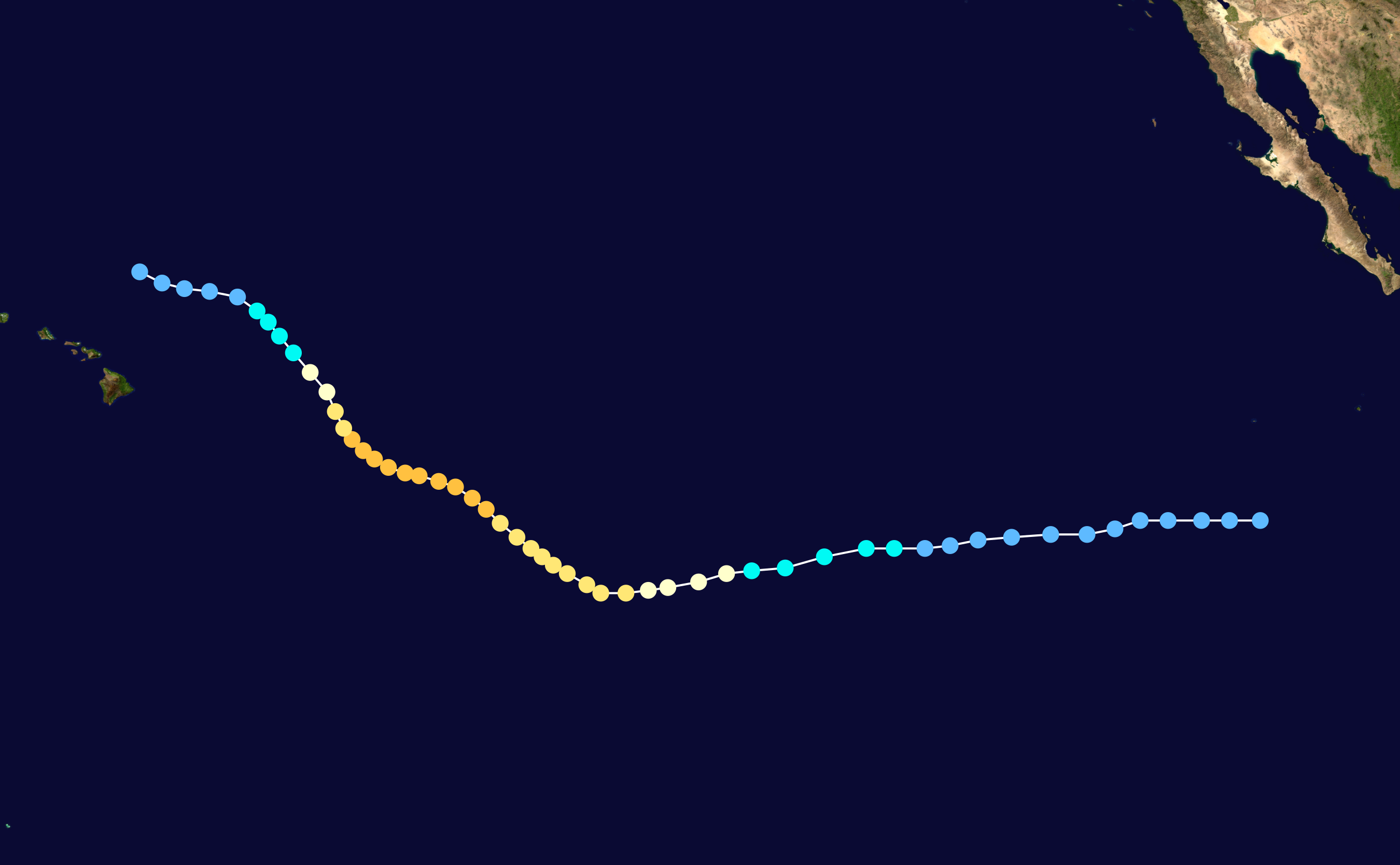
Storm path of Hurricane Jova

- 18:00 UTC (11:00 a.m. PDT) at 12.3°N 118.0°W – Tropical Depression Eleven-E forms from a tropical wave about 905 mi (1,455 km) southwest of Cabo San Lucas.

September 15

- 00:00 UTC (5:00 p.m. PDT, September 14) at 13.8°N 127.6°W – Tropical Depression Ten-E strengthens into Tropical Storm Jova about 1,310 mi (2,110 km) west-southwest of Cabo San Lucas.
- 06:00 UTC (11:00 p.m. PDT, September 14) at 12.9°N 119.3°W – Tropical Depression Eleven-E strengthens into Tropical Storm Kenneth about 920 mi (1,480 km) southwest of Cabo San Lucas.

September 16

- 00:00 UTC (5:00 p.m. PDT, September 15) at 13.0°N 121.3°W – Tropical Storm Kenneth strengthens into a Category 1 hurricane about 1,005 mi (1,620 km) southwest of Cabo San Lucas.
- 06:00 UTC (11:00 p.m. PDT, September 15) at 12.9°N 133.6°W – Tropical Storm Jova strengthens into a Category 1 hurricane about 1,695 mi (2,730 km) west-southwest of Cabo San Lucas.

September 17

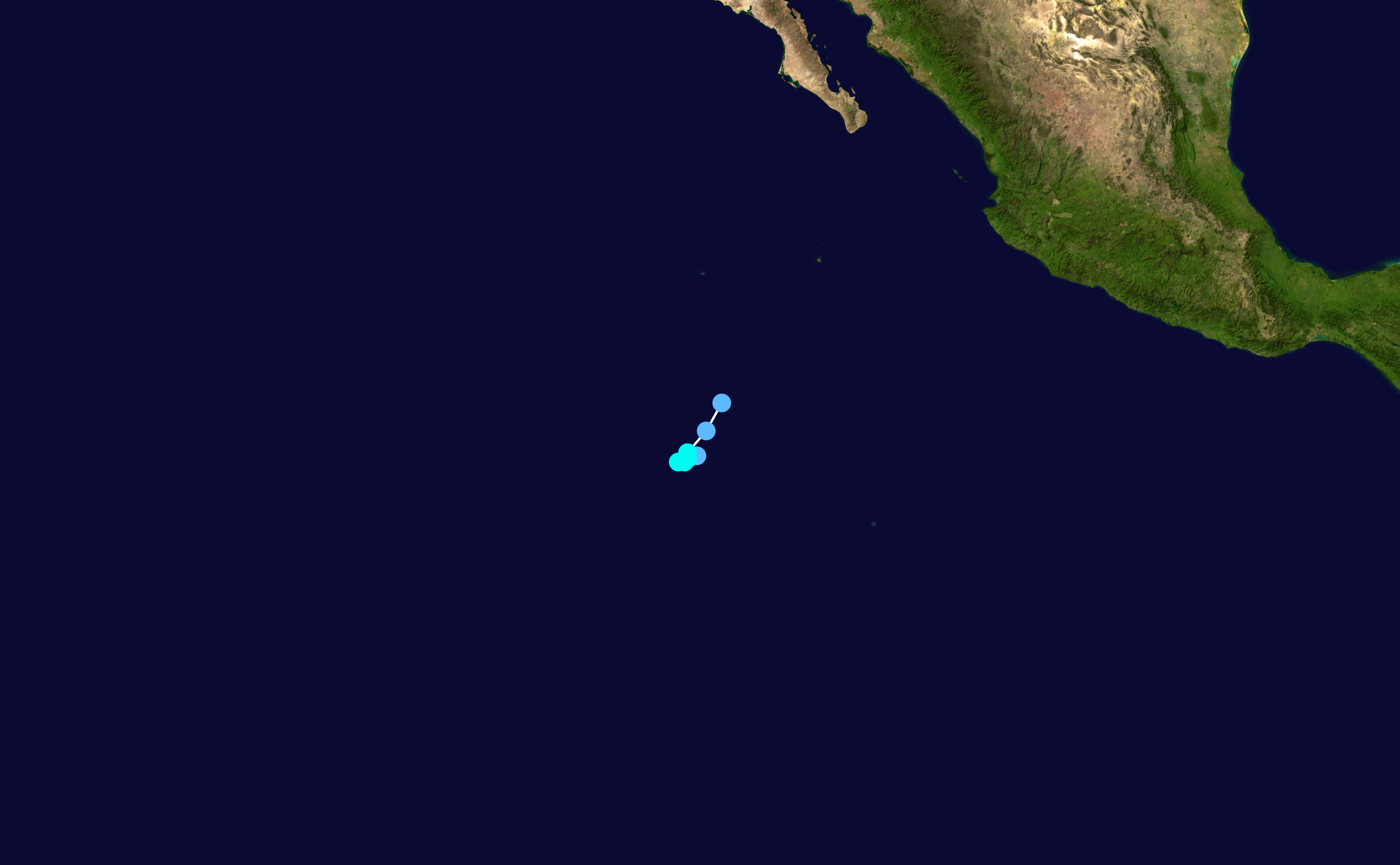
Storm path of Tropical Storm Lidia

- 00:00 UTC (5:00 p.m. PDT, September 16) at 13.2°N 124.7°W – Hurricane Kenneth strengthens to Category 2 intensity about 1,175 mi (1,890 km) southwest of Cabo San Lucas.
- 06:00 UTC (11:00 p.m. PDT, September 16) at 12.2°N 137.2°W – Hurricane Jova strengthens to Category 2 intensity about 1,935 mi (3,110 km) west-southwest of Cabo San Lucas.
- 06:00 UTC (11:00 p.m. PDT, September 16) at 13.5°N 125.5°W – Hurricane Kenneth strengthens to Category 3 intensity about 1,210 mi (1,945 km) southwest of Cabo San Lucas, making it the first major hurricane of the season.
- 12:00 UTC (5:00 a.m. PDT) at 12.5°N 114.9°W – Tropical Depression Twelve-E forms from a tropical wave about 790 mi (1,270 km) south-southwest of Cabo San Lucas.
- 18:00 UTC (11:00 a.m. PDT) at 12.4°N 115.2°W – Tropical Depression Twelve-E strengthens into Tropical Storm Lidia about 800 mi (1,285 km) south-southwest of Cabo San Lucas. It simultaneously attains its peak intensity, with maximum sustained winds of 40 mph (65 km/h) and a minimum central pressure of 1005 mbar (29.68 inHg).

September 18

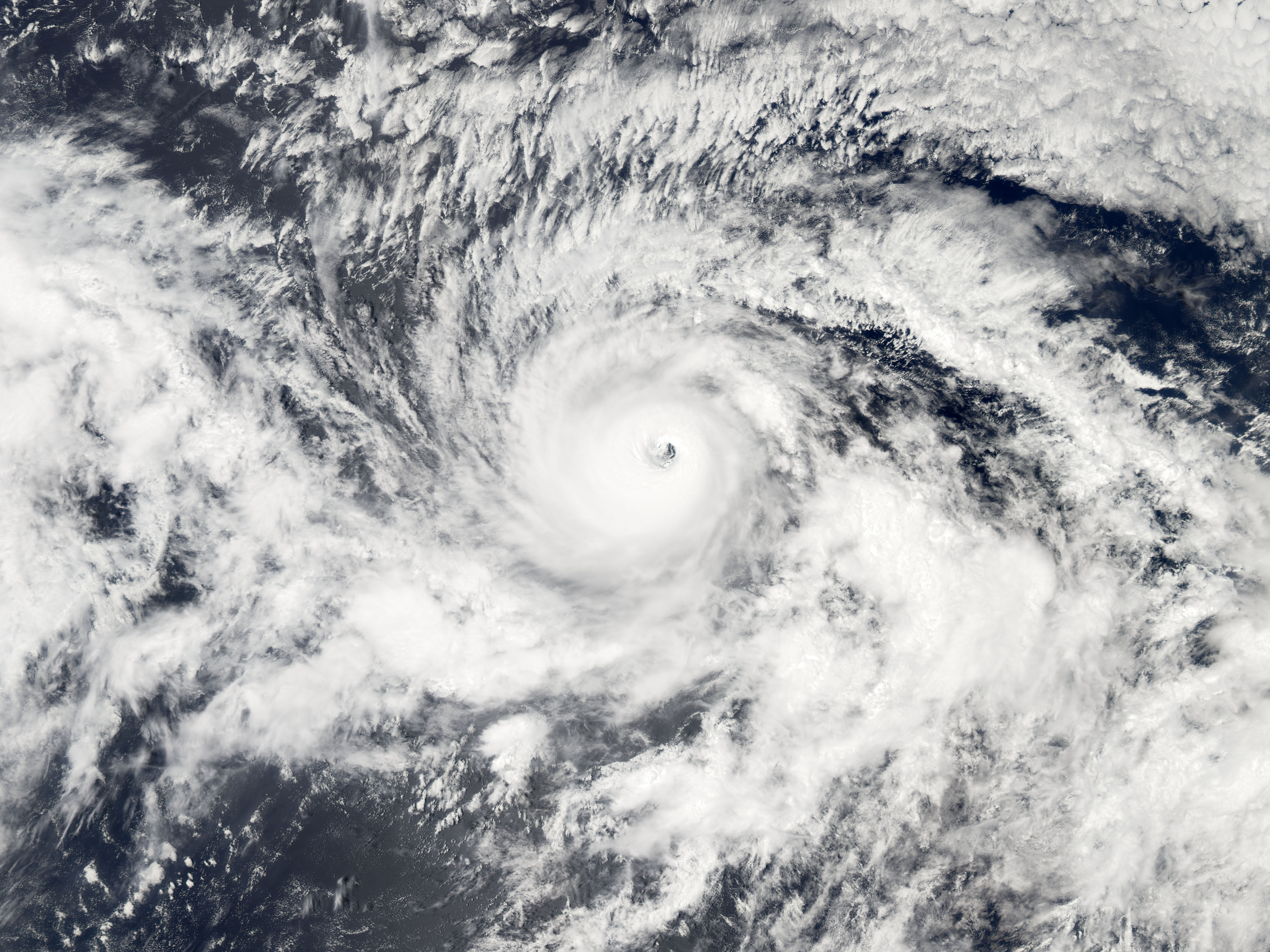
Hurricane Kenneth near peak intensity late on September 18

- 12:00 UTC (2:00 a.m. HST) at 13.5°N 140.2°W – Hurricane Jova crosses 140°W into the Central Pacific basin about 1,075 mi (1,730 km) east-southeast of Hilo.
- 12:00 UTC (5:00 a.m. PDT) at 14.2°N 129.2°W – Hurricane Kenneth strengthens to Category 4 intensity about 1,390 mi (2,240 km) west-southwest of Cabo San Lucas. It simultaneously attains its peak intensity, with maximum sustained winds of 130 mph (215 km/h) and a minimum central pressure of 947 mbar (27.96 inHg), making it the strongest storm of the season.
- 12:00 UTC (5:00 a.m. PDT) at 15.0°N 113.0°W – Tropical Depression Thirteen-E forms from a tropical wave about 580 mi (935 km) south-southwest of Cabo San Lucas.
- 18:00 UTC (11:00 a.m. PDT) at 13.3°N 114.6°W – Tropical Storm Lidia weakens into a tropical depression about 725 mi (1,165 km) south-southwest of Cabo San Lucas.
- 18:00 UTC (11:00 a.m. PDT) at 15.2°N 114.1°W – Tropical Depression Thirteen-E strengthens into Tropical Storm Max about 595 mi (955 km) south-southwest of Cabo San Lucas.

September 19

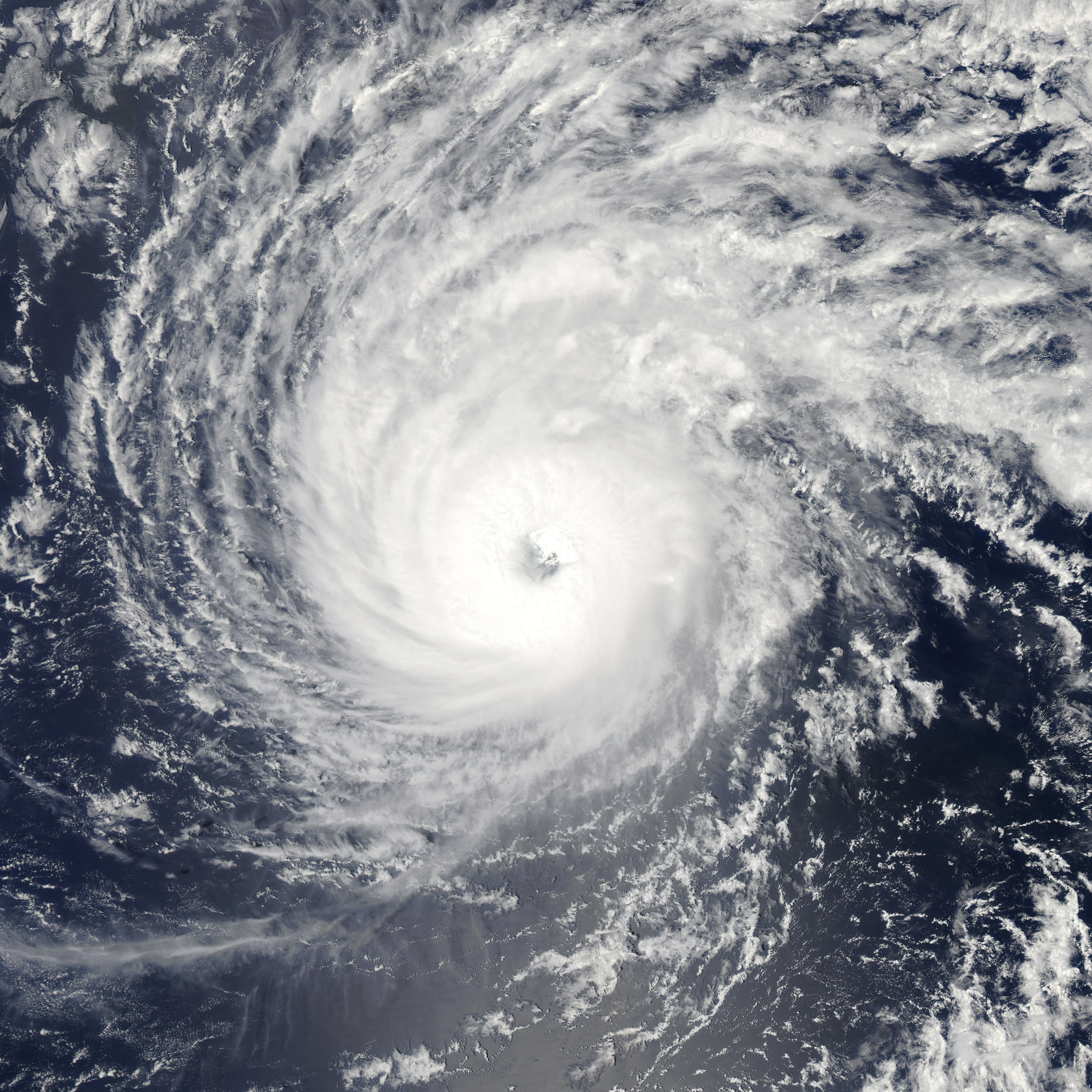
Hurricane Jova near peak intensity late on September 19

- 00:00 UTC (5:00 p.m. PDT, September 18) at 14.2°N 114.1°W – Tropical Depression Lidia is last noted as a tropical cyclone about 655 mi (1,055 km) south-southwest of Cabo San Lucas, dissipating shortly thereafter when Tropical Storm Max absorbs it.
- 06:00 UTC (11:00 p.m. PDT, September 18) at 13.7°N 130.4°W – Hurricane Kenneth weakens to Category 3 intensity about 1,480 mi (2,380 km) west-southwest of Cabo San Lucas.
- 12:00 UTC (2:00 a.m. HST) at 15.2°N 142.2°W – Hurricane Jova strengthens to Category 3 intensity about 905 mi (1,455 km) east-southeast of Hilo, making it the second and final major hurricane of the season.
- 18:00 UTC (11:00 a.m. PDT) at 13.4°N 130.6°W – Hurricane Kenneth weakens to Category 2 intensity about 1,500 mi (2,415 km) west-southwest of Cabo San Lucas.

September 20

- 00:00 UTC (2:00 p.m. HST, September 19) at 16.0°N 143.3°W – Hurricane Jova attains its peak intensity, with maximum sustained winds of 125 mph (205 km/h) and a minimum central pressure of 951 mbar (28.08 inHg), about 815 mi (1,315 km) east-southeast of Hilo.
- 00:00 UTC (5:00 p.m. PDT, September 19) at 13.4°N 130.8°W – Hurricane Kenneth weakens to Category 1 intensity about 1,515 mi (2,435 km) west-southwest of Cabo San Lucas.
- 00:00 UTC (5:00 p.m. PDT, September 19) at 18.0°N 117.4°W – Tropical Storm Max strengthens into a Category 1 hurricane about 585 mi (945 km) southwest of Cabo San Lucas.
- 12:00 UTC (5:00 a.m. PDT) at 19.3°N 118.8°W – Hurricane Max attains its peak intensity, with maximum sustained winds of 85 mph (140 km/h) and a minimum central pressure of 981 mbar (28.97 inHg), about 620 mi (1,000 km) west-southwest of Cabo San Lucas.
- 18:00 UTC (11:00 a.m. PDT) at 13.2°N 131.2°W – Hurricane Kenneth weakens into a tropical storm about 1,540 mi (2,480 km) west-southwest of Cabo San Lucas.

September 21

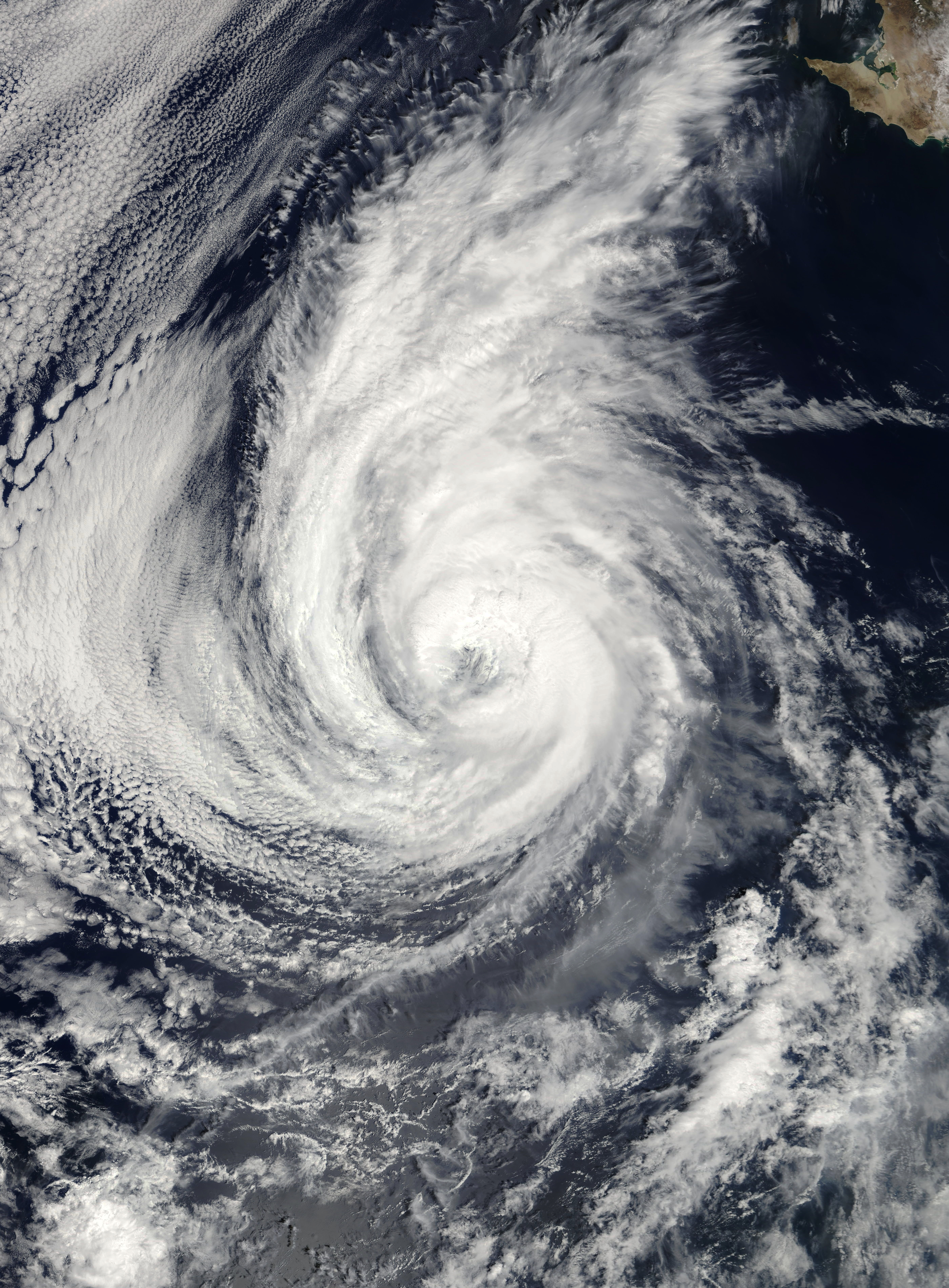
Hurricane Max on September 20

- 06:00 UTC (11:00 p.m. PDT, September 20) at 21.2°N 120.0°W – Hurricane Max weakens into a tropical storm about 650 mi (1,045 km) west of Cabo San Lucas.

September 22

- 00:00 UTC (2:00 p.m. HST, September 21) at 18.1°N 147.3°W – Hurricane Jova weakens to Category 2 intensity about 520 mi (835 km) east-southeast of Hilo.
- 12:00 UTC (2:00 a.m. HST) at 19.4°N 147.9°W – Hurricane Jova weakens to Category 1 intensity about 465 mi (750 km) east of Hilo.
- 12:00 UTC (5:00 a.m. PDT) at 21.8°N 122.1°W – Tropical Storm Max weakens into a tropical depression about 775 mi (1,250 km) west of Cabo San Lucas.
- 18:00 UTC (11:00 a.m. PDT) at 21.8°N 122.5°W – Tropical Depression Max degenerates into a remnant low about 805 mi (1,295 km) west of Cabo San Lucas, and later dissipates.

September 23

- 00:00 UTC (2:00 p.m. HST, September 22) at 20.8°N 149.1°W – Hurricane Jova weakens into a tropical storm about 395 mi (640 km) east of Hilo.
- 00:00 UTC (5:00 p.m. PDT, September 22) at 14.8°N 108.5°W – Tropical Depression Fourteen-E forms from a large area of unsettled weather about 565 mi (905 km) south of Cabo San Lucas.
- 12:00 UTC (5:00 a.m. PDT) at 15.0°N 109.6°W – Tropical Depression Fourteen-E strengthens into Tropical Storm Norma about 545 mi (880 km) south of Cabo San Lucas.

September 24

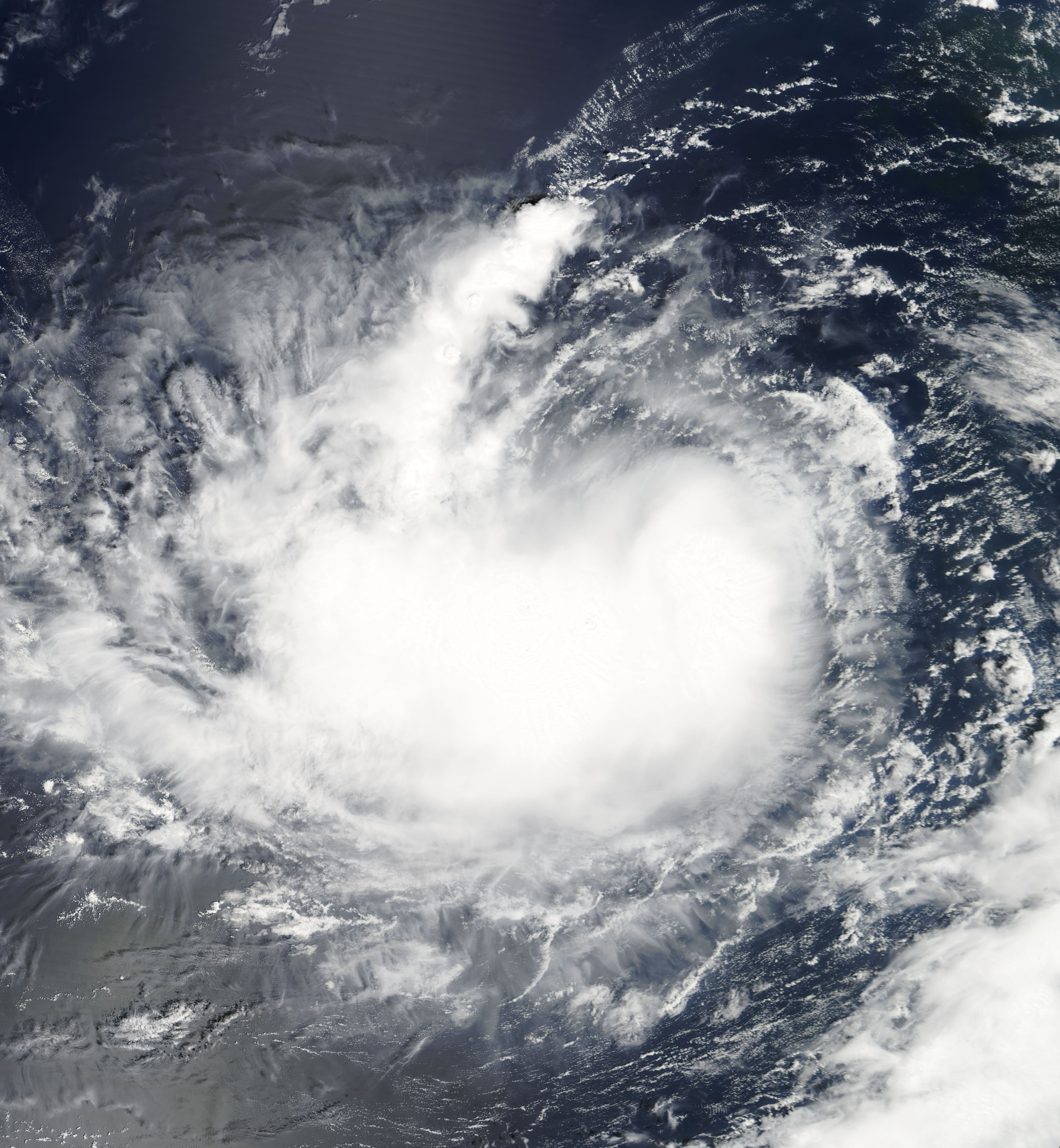
Tropical Storm Norma at peak intensity late on September 24

- 00:00 UTC (2:00 p.m. HST, September 23) at 22.8°N 151.1°W – Tropical Storm Jova weakens into a tropical depression about 335 mi (535 km) northeast of Hilo.
- 18:00 UTC (11:00 a.m. PDT) at 16.3°N 110.8°W – Tropical Storm Norma attains its peak intensity, with maximum sustained winds of 60 mph (95 km/h) and a minimum central pressure of 997 mbar (29.44 inHg), about 455 mi (730 km) south of Cabo San Lucas.

September 25

- 00:00 UTC (2:00 p.m. HST, September 24) at 23.7°N 154.6°W – Tropical Depression Jova is last noted as a tropical cyclone about 275 mi (445 km) north of Hilo, dissipating shortly thereafter.
- 00:00 UTC (5:00 p.m. PDT, September 24) at 16.4°N 139.3°W – Tropical Storm Kenneth restrengthens into a Category 1 hurricane about 1,955 mi (3,150 km) west-southwest of Cabo San Lucas.

September 26

- 06:00 UTC (8:00 p.m. HST, September 25) at 15.3°N 140.1°W – Hurricane Kenneth crosses 140°W into the Central Pacific basin about 1,030 mi (1,660 km) east-southeast of Hilo.
- 12:00 UTC (2:00 a.m. HST) at 14.8°N 140.2°W – Hurricane Kenneth weakens into a tropical storm about 1,035 mi (1,665 km) east-southeast of Hilo.
- 18:00 UTC (11:00 a.m. PDT) at 20.3°N 114.7°W – Tropical Storm Norma weakens into a tropical depression about 350 mi (565 km) west-southwest of Cabo San Lucas.

September 27

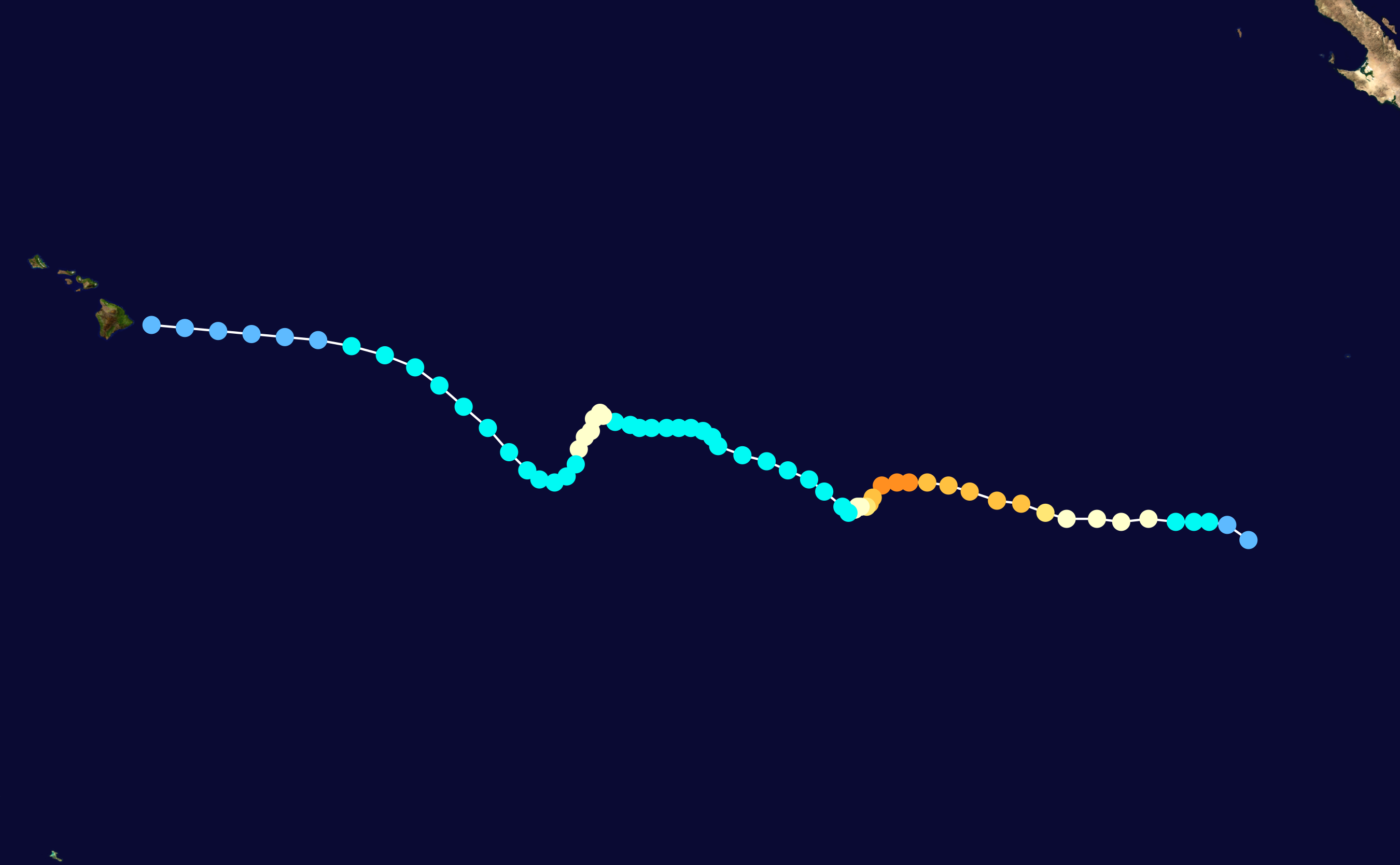
Storm path of Hurricane Kenneth

- 18:00 UTC (11:00 a.m. PDT) at 22.3°N 117.3°W – Tropical Depression Norma degenerates into a remnant low about 470 mi (760 km) west of Cabo San Lucas, and later dissipates.

September 28

- 00:00 UTC (5:00 p.m. PDT, September 27) at 17.2°N 104.9°W – Tropical Depression Fifteen-E forms from a tropical wave about 180 mi (285 km) south of Manzanillo.

September 29

- 06:00 UTC (11:00 p.m. PDT, September 28) at 17.3°N 107.2°W – Tropical Depression Fifteen-E strengthens into Tropical Storm Otis about 255 mi (405 km) southwest of Manzanillo.
- 12:00 UTC (2:00 a.m. HST) at 18.9°N 148.7°W – Tropical Storm Kenneth weakens to a tropical depression about 420 mi (675 km) east of Hilo.

September 30

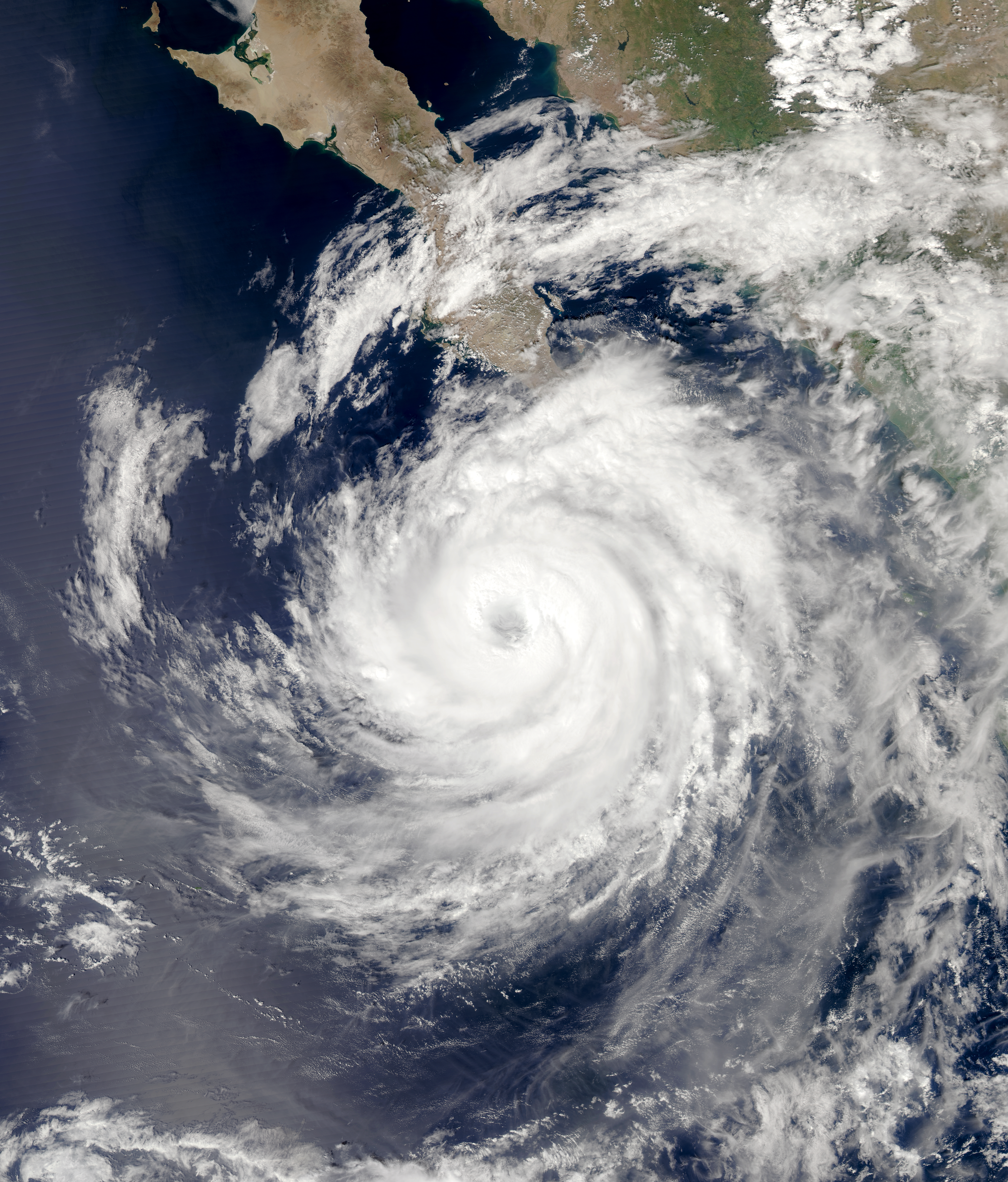
Hurricane Otis gaining strength late on September 30

- 06:00 UTC (11:00 p.m. PDT, September 29) at 20.3°N 110.0°W – Tropical Storm Otis strengthens into a Category 1 hurricane about 180 mi (285 km) south of Cabo San Lucas.
- 18:00 UTC (8:00 a.m. HST) at 19.4°N 154.2°W – Tropical Depression Kenneth is last noted as a tropical cyclone about 65 mi (100 km) east-southeast of Hilo, dissipating shortly thereafter.

=== October ===
October 1

- 06:00 UTC (11:00 p.m. PDT, September 30) at 21.6°N 111.5°W – Hurricane Otis strengthens Category 2 intensity about 130 mph (215 km/h) southwest of Cabo San Lucas. It simultaneously attains its peak intensity, with maximum sustained winds of 105 mph (165 km/h) and a minimum central pressure of 970 mbar (28.64 inHg).
- 18:00 UTC (11:00 a.m. PDT) at 21.8°N 111.9°W – Hurricane Otis weakens to Category 1 intensity about 145 mi (230 km) west-southwest of Cabo San Lucas.

October 2

- 12:00 UTC (5:00 a.m. PDT) at 22.3°N 112.1°W – Hurricane Otis weakens into a tropical storm about 145 mi (230 km) west-southwest of Cabo San Lucas.

October 3

- 12:00 UTC (5:00 a.m. PDT) at 24.8°N 112.9°W – Tropical Storm Otis weakens into a tropical depression about 230 mi (370 km) northwest of Cabo San Lucas.

October 4

- 00:00 UTC (5:00 p.m. PDT, October 3) at 25.5°N 113.3°W – Tropical Depression Otis degenerates into a remnant low about 275 mi (445 km) northwest of Cabo San Lucas, and later dissipates.

October 15

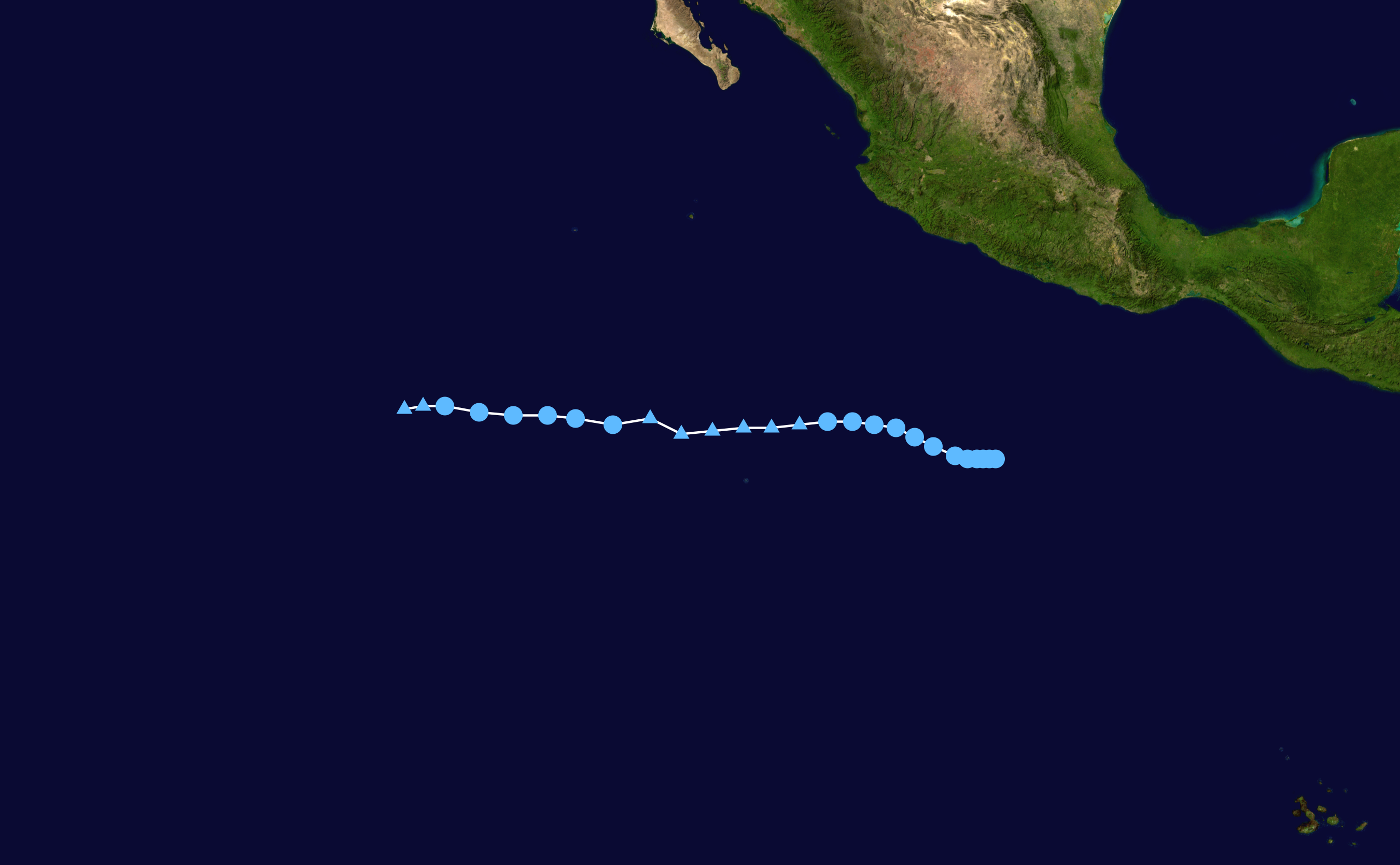
Storm path of Tropical Depression Sixteen-E

- 00:00 UTC (5:00 p.m. PDT, October 14) at 11.0°N 101.2°W – Tropical Depression Sixteen-E forms from a tropical wave about 415 mi (665 km) south of Acapulco.

October 16

- 06:00 UTC (11:00 p.m. PDT, October 15) at 11.1°N 102.5°W – Tropical Depression Sixteen-E attains its peak intensity, with maximum sustained winds of 35 mph (55 km/h) and a minimum central pressure of 1005 mbar (29.68 inHg), about 435 mi (705 km) south-southwest of Acapulco.

October 18

- 00:00 UTC (5:00 p.m. PDT, October 17) at 12.1°N 107.5°W – Tropical Depression Sixteen-E degenerates into a remnant low about 605 mi (970 km) southwest of Acapulco.

October 19

- 12:00 UTC (5:00 a.m. PDT) at 12.1°N 113.5°W – The remnants of Sixteen-E regenerate into a tropical depression about 775 mi (1,250 km) south-southwest of Cabo San Lucas.

October 21

- 00:00 UTC (5:00 p.m. PDT, October 20) at 12.7°N 119.6°W – Tropical Depression Sixteen-E again degenerates into a remnant low about 945 mi (1,520 km) southwest of Cabo San Lucas, and later dissipates when the Intertropical Convergence Zone absorbs it.

=== November ===
November 30

- The 2005 Pacific hurricane season officially ends.

== See also ==
- 2005 Pacific hurricane season
- Pacific hurricane season
- Timeline of the 2005 Atlantic hurricane season
- Timeline of the 2005 Pacific typhoon season
