= List of named storms (Q) =

Storms are named for historical reasons to avoid confusion when communicating with the public, as more than one storm can exist at a time. Names are drawn in order from predetermined lists. For tropical cyclones, names are assigned when a system has one-, three-, or ten-minute winds of more than 65 km/h (40 mph). Standards, however, vary from basin to basin. For example, some tropical depressions are named in the Western Pacific, while within the Australian and Southern Pacific regions, the naming of tropical cyclones are delayed until they have gale-force winds occurring more than halfway around the storm center.

This list covers the letter Q.

== Storms ==
Note: † indicates the name was retired after that usage in the respective basin

- Qendresa (2014) – also known as Medicane Qendresa; made landfall in Malta and Italy as a strong cyclone, causing three fatalities.
- Quang (2015)† – intense cyclone that made landfall in Western Australia as a minimal cyclone, caused no deaths.
- Quedan

- 2001 – tropical storm that struck the Philippines.
- 2005 – tropical depression that was recognized by PAGASA and JTWC.
- 2009 – very intense typhoon that made landfall in Japan as a minimal typhoon, causing three deaths and $1.5 billion in damages.
- 2013 – strongest typhoon to make landfall in mainland China since 1949; second-costliest typhoon to strike China.
- 2017 – passed close to Japan as a severe tropical storm.
- 2025 – a Category 1 typhoon which passed near the coast of Japan.

- Queenie

- 1945 – typhoon that struck the Philippines as a tropical storm.
- 2006 – powerful typhoon that struck the Philippines.
- 2014 – struck Vietnam.
- 2018 – tied as the strongest cyclone worldwide in 2018, along with Typhoon Yutu; passed through South Korea as a tropical storm.
- 2022 – remained out at sea.
- 2026 – a Category 4 typhoon that passed near the coast of Japan.

- Quenton

- 1983 - first cyclone to make landfall in Australia in November since 1973.
- 1994† - stayed out at sea throughout its life.

- Querida

- 1946 – typhoon that struck Taiwan, killing 154 and injuring 618.
- 2006 – a rare Mediterranean tropical-like cyclone

- Querubin (2024) – a tropical depression that minimally affected the Philippines.
- Quiel

- 2003 – a short-lived system that was only recognized by PAGASA.
- 2011 – struck the Philippines as a Category 4 super typhoon and later affected Hainan, China as a weak tropical storm.
- 2019 – developed west of the main Philippine Islands and made landfall in Southern Vietnam.

- Quinta

- 2004 – made landfall in Japan as a Category 2 typhoon
- 2008 – renamed Siony; mostly stayed out at sea
- 2012 – tropical storm that brought flash floods to the Philippines
- 2020† – deadly tropical cyclone that devastated the Philippines.

== See also ==
- European windstorm names
- Atlantic hurricane season
- List of Pacific hurricane seasons
- Tropical cyclone naming
- South Atlantic tropical cyclone
- Tropical cyclone
