= List of very strong typhoons =

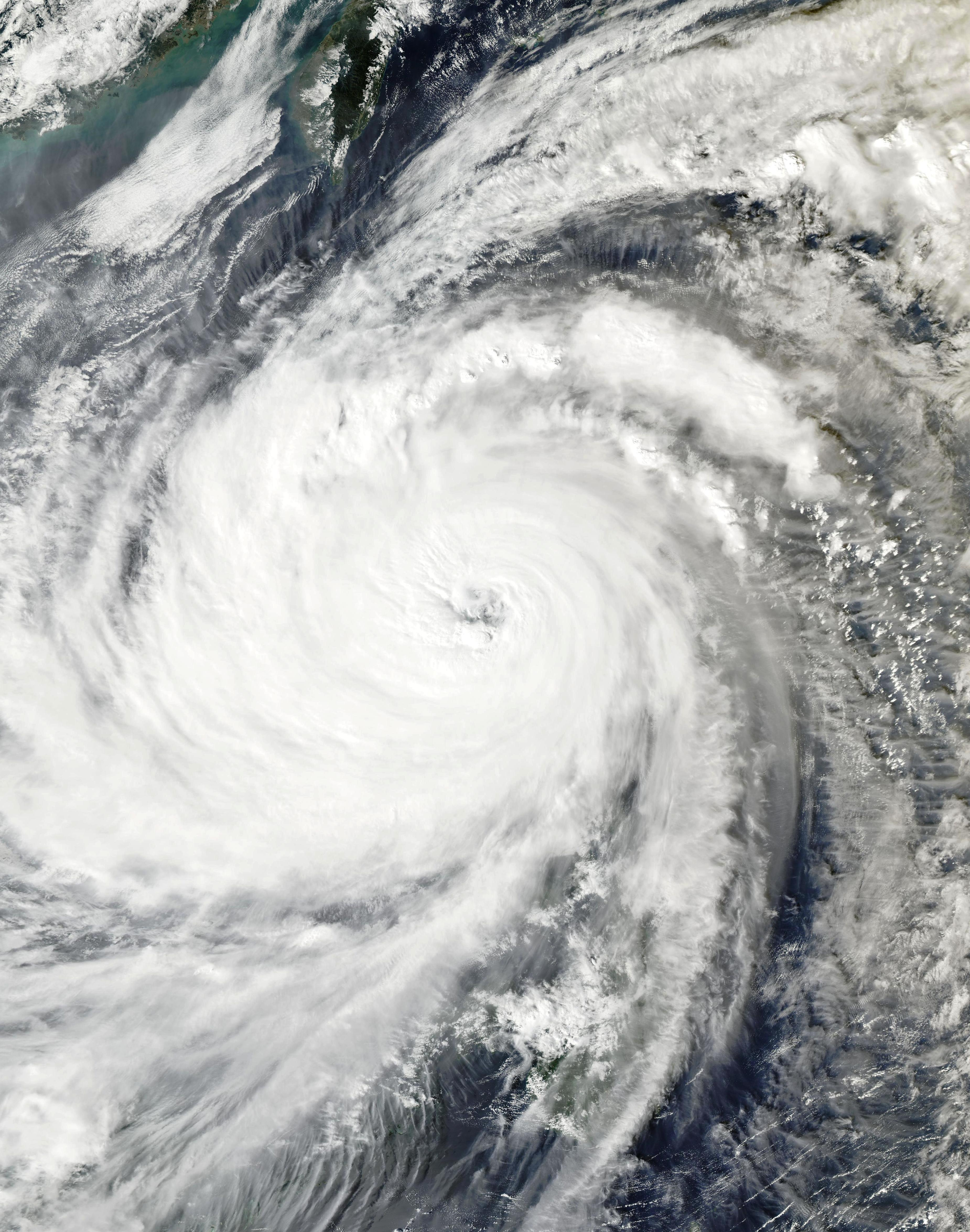
Typhoon Fung-wong making landfall in the Philippines in November 2025

A very strong typhoon is the second highest category used by the Japan Meteorological Agency (JMA) to classify tropical cyclones that has reached typhoon intensity in the Northwest Pacific basin. The basin is limited to the north of the equator between the 100th meridian east and the 180th meridian. The category of a very strong typhoon is defined as a tropical cyclone that has 10-minute sustained wind speeds between 85 and 104 knots (157–193 km/h; 97–121 mph) or greater.

== Background ==
RSMC Tokyo's Tropical Cyclone Intensity Scale
Category	Sustained winds
Violent Typhoon	≥105 knots ≥194 km/h
Very Strong Typhoon	85–104 knots 157–193 km/h
Typhoon	64–84 knots 118–156 km/h
Severe Tropical Storm	48–63 knots 89–117 km/h
Tropical Storm	34–47 knots 62–88 km/h
Tropical Depression	≤33 knots ≤61 km/h

The Northwest Pacific basin covers a vast area in the Pacific Ocean, located north of the equator, between 100°E and 180°E. Several weather agencies monitor this basin, however it is officially monitored by the Japan Meteorological Agency (JMA, RSMC Tokyo), who is responsible for forecasting, naming and issuing warnings for tropical cyclones. Unofficially, the Joint Typhoon Warning Center also monitors the basin, however these warnings measures 1-minute sustained wind speeds, comparing their scale to the Saffir–Simpson scale. The JMA uses a simpler scale on classifying tropical cyclones adapted by the ESCAP/WMO Typhoon Committee measuring 10-minute sustained wind speeds, ranging from a tropical depression, tropical storm, severe tropical storm and typhoon. Furthermore, the JMA divides the typhoon category into three sub-categories for domestic purposes – a strong typhoon, very strong typhoon and violent typhoon.

This article covers a list of systems developing in the Northwest Pacific basin that were classified by the JMA's category of a violent typhoon. The category of a violent typhoon ranges with 10-minute sustained winds of 105 kn (54 m/s; 121 mph; 194 km/h) or greater.

== Systems ==
Key

- † Discontinuous duration (weakened below a "Very strong" typhoon then restrengthened to that classification at least once)

=== 1990s ===
Name	System dates	Duration (hours)	Sustained wind speeds	Pressure	Areas affected	Damage (USD)	Deaths	Refs
Steve	July 28 – 29, 1990	24	155 km/h (100 mph)	940 hPa (27.76 inHg)	Mariana Islands	None	None	
Mike	November 10 – 12, 1990	60	185 km/h (115 mph)	915 hPa (27.02 inHg)	Philippines, Vietnam, South China	$389 million	798	
Owen	November 23 – 29, 1990	90†	175 km/h (110 mph)	925 hPa (27.32 inHg)	Micronesia	None	2	
Russ	December 18 – 22, 1990	108	185 km/h (115 mph)	915 hPa (27.02 inHg)	Micronesia	$120 million	None	
Walt	May 10 – 14, 1991	114	185 km/h (115 mph)	915 hPa (27.02 inHg)	Caroline Islands, Philippines	None	None	
Amy	July 18 – 19, 1991	30	175 km/h (110 mph)	930 hPa (27.46 inHg)	Philippines, Taiwan, South China	Unknown	130	
Ivy	September 6 – 8, 1991	45	175 km/h (110 mph)	935 hPa (27.61 inHg)	Mariana Islands, Japan	None	1	
Orchid	October 6 – 9, 1991	72	175 km/h (110 mph)	930 hPa (27.46 inHg)	Mariana Islands	None	None	
Seth	November 3 – 11, 1991	168†	185 km/h (115 mph)	925 hPa (27.32 inHg)	Micronesia, Philippines	Unknown	Unknown	
Bobbie	June 26 – 28, 1992	33	155 km/h (100 mph)	940 hPa (27.76 inHg)	Philippines, Japan	$2.9 million	None	
Janis	August 6 – 8, 1992	21	175 km/h (110 mph)	935 hPa (27.61 inHg)	Mariana Islands, Japan	$45.6 million	2	
Kent	August 10 – 12, 1992	48	175 km/h (110 mph)	930 hPa (27.46 inHg)	Japan	None	5	
Omar	August 29 – September 2, 1992	102	185 km/h (115 mph)	920 hPa (27.17 inHg)	Micronesia, Philippines, Taiwan, China	$561 million	15	
Ryan	September 6 – 8, 1992	48	155 km/h (100 mph)	945 hPa (27.91 inHg)	Mariana Islands	None	None	
Sibyl	September 11 – 12, 1992	36	155 km/h (100 mph)	940 hPa (27.76 inHg)	None	None	None	
Ward	October 2 – 3, 1992	12	155 km/h (100 mph)	945 hPa (27.91 inHg)	None	None	None	
Yvette	October 10 – 16, 1992	138	185 km/h (115 mph)	915 hPa (27.02 inHg)	Philippines	None	None	
Dan	November 1 – 2, 1992	24	165 km/h (105 mph)	935 hPa (27.61 inHg)	Marshall Islands	None	None	
Hunt	November 19 – 20, 1992	42	165 km/h (105 mph)	940 hPa (27.76 inHg)	Marshall Islands	None	None	
Robyn	August 6 – 8, 1993	66	155 km/h (100 mph)	940 hPa (27.76 inHg)	Mariana Islands, Japan, South Korea	$68 million	45	
Keoni	August 21 – 22, 1993	30	165 km/h (105 mph)	940 hPa (27.76 inHg)	Marshall Islands	None	None	
Yancy	September 1 – 3, 1993	42	175 km/h (110 mph)	925 hPa (27.32 inHg)	Japan	$1.67 billion	48	
Abe	September 13, 1993	12	155 km/h (100 mph)	940 hPa (27.76 inHg)	Philippines, Taiwan	None	None	
Ed	October 4 – 5, 1993	48	185 km/h (115 mph)	915 hPa (27.32 inHg)	Mariana Islands	None	None	

=== 2000s ===
Name	Track	System dates	Duration (hours)	Sustained wind speeds	Pressure	Areas affected	Damage (USD)	Deaths	Refs
Damrey		May 9 – 10, 2000	30	165 km/h (105 mph)	930 hPa (27.46 inHg)	None	None	None	
Kirogi		July 5, 2000	18	155 km/h (100 mph)	940 hPa (27.76 inHg)	Japan	$140 million	5	
Jelawat		August 3, 2000	24	155 km/h (100 mph)	940 hPa (27.76 inHg)	Ryukyu Islands, East China	Unknown	None	
Saomai		September 9 – 12, 2000	57	175 km/h (110 mph)	925 hPa (27.32 inHg)	Ryukyu Islands, East China, Korean Peninsula	$6.3 billion	28	
Shanshan		September 20 – 23, 2000	72	175 km/h (140 mph)	920 hPa (27.17 inHg)	None	None	None	
Wutip		August 29 – 30, 2001	30	165 km/h (105 mph)	930 hPa (27.46 inHg)	None	None	None	
Danas		September 8 – 9, 2001	30	155 km/h (100 mph)	945 hPa (27.91 inHg)	Japan	$12.8 million	9	
Francisco		September 23 – 24, 2001	12	165 km/h (105 mph)	930 hPa (27.46 inHg)	None	None	None	
Podul		October 23 – 26, 2001	90	185 km/h (115 mph)	925 hPa (27.32 inHg)	Caroline Islands	None	None	
Mitag		March 4 – 6, 2002	60	175 km/h (110 mph)	930 hPa (27.46 inHg)	Caroline Islands	$150 million	2	
Hagibis		May 19 – 20, 2002	30	175 km/h (110 mph)	935 hPa (27.61 inHg)	Mariana Islands	None	None	
Rammasun		July 2 – 4, 2002	39	155 km/h (100 mph)	945 hPa (27.91 inHg)	Taiwan, Ryukyu Islands, East China, Korean Peninsula	$100 million	97	
Chataan		July 5 – 9, 2002	84	175 km/h (110 mph)	930 hPa (27.46 inHg)	Mariana Islands, Japan	$660 million	4	
Halong		July 12 – 13, 2002	30	155 km/h (100 mph)	945 hPa (27.91 inHg)	Mariana Islands, Philippines, Japan	$89.8 million	10	
Fengshen		July 16 – 23, 2002	162	185 km/h (115 mph)	920 hPa (27.17 inHg)	Japan, East China	$4 million	5	
Phanfone		August 15 – 16, 2002	30	155 km/h (100 mph)	940 hPa (27.76 inHg)	Japan	None	None	
Ele		August 30 – September 4, 2002	120	165 km/h (105 mph)	945 hPa (27.91 inHg)	None	None	None	
Higos		September 29 – 30, 2002	42	175 km/h (110 mph)	930 hPa (27.46 inHg)	Japan	$2.41 billion	12	
Haishen		November 23, 2002	12	155 km/h (100 mph)	955 hPa (28.20 inHg)	None	None	None	
Pongsona		December 8 – 10, 2002	54	165 km/h (105 mph)	940 hPa (27.76 inHg)	Mariana Islands	$730 million	1	
Kujira		April 15 – 18, 2003	72	165 km/h (105 mph)	935 hPa (27.61 inHg)	Micronesia, Philippines, Taiwan, Japan	$230,000	3	
Chan-hom		May 23 – 24, 2003	30	155 km/h (100 mph)	940 hPa (27.76 inHg)	Mariana Islands	$16 million	None	
Imbudo		July 20 – 21, 2003	36	165 km/h (105 mph)	935 hPa (27.61 inHg)	Philippines, China	$383 million	5	
Etau		August 7, 2003	6	155 km/h (100 mph)	945 hPa (27.91 inHg)	Caroline Islands, Japan	$295 million	20	
Ketsana		October 21 – 23, 2003	66	165 km/h (105 mph)	940 hPa (27.76 inHg)	None	None	None	
Parma		October 23 – 30, 2003	84†	175 km/h (110 mph)	930 hPa (27.46 inHg)	None	None	None	
Lupit		November 25 – 29, 2003	102	185 km/h (110 mph)	915 hPa (27.02 inHg)	Micronesia	$1.7 million	None	
Sudal		April 9 – 13, 2004	108	165 km/h (105 mph)	940 hPa (27.76 inHg)	Caroline Islands	$14 million	None	
Nida		May 16 – 18, 2004	66	175 km/h (110 mph)	935 hPa (27.61 inHg)	Caroline Islands, Philippines, Japan	$1.3 million	31	
Dianmu		June 15 – 20, 2004	120	185 km/h (115 mph)	915 hPa (27.02 inHg)	Caroline Islands, Japan	$68.5 million	6	
Mindulle		June 28 – 30, 2004	54	175 km/h (110 mph)	940 hPa (27.76 inHg)	Philippines, Taiwan, East China, Ryukyu Islands, Korean Peninsula	$833 million	56	
Namtheun		July 26 – 27, 2004	30	155 km/h (100 mph)	935 hPa (27.61 inHg)	Japan	None	None	
Songda		August 31 – September 6, 2004	150	175 km/h (110 mph)	925 hPa (27.32 inHg)	Mariana Islands, Japan	$9 billion	28	
Meari		September 24 – 27, 2004	63†	165 km/h (105 mph)	940 hPa (27.76 inHg)	Caroline Islands, Japan	$798 million	18	
Ma-on		October 7 – 9, 2004	45	185 km/h (115 mph)	920 hPa (27.17 inHg)	Japan	$623 million	7	
Tokage		October 16 – 18, 2004	54	155 km/h (100 mph)	940 hPa (27.76 inHg)	Mariana Islands, Taiwan, Japan	$2.3 billion	5	
Nock-ten		October 23 – 24, 2004	36	155 km/h (100 mph)	945 hPa (27.91 inHg)	Micronesia, Taiwan, Ryukyu Islands	None	3	
Nanmadol		December 1, 2004	24	165 km/h (105 mph)	935 hPa (27.61 inHg)	Caroline Islands, Philippines	$60.8 million	77	
Sonca		April 24 – 26, 2005	48	165 km/h (105 mph)	935 hPa (27.61 inHg)	Caroline Islands	None	None	
Nesat		June 2 – 6, 2005	96†	175 km/h (110 mph)	930 hPa (27.46 inHg)	Caroline Islands	None	None	
Mawar		August 24, 2005	18	155 km/h (100 mph)	945 hPa (27.91 inHg)	Japan	None	2	
Talim		August 29 – 31, 2005	54	175 km/h (110 mph)	925 hPa (27.32 inHg)	Taiwan, East China	$1.5 billion	157	
Nabi		August 31 – September 5, 2005	132	175 km/h (110 mph)	925 hPa (27.32 inHg)	Micronesia, Japan, Korean Peninsula	972 million	35	
Khanun		September 10, 2005	18	155 km/h (100 mph)	945 hPa (27.91 inHg)	Taiwan, Ryukyu Islands, Korean Peninsula	$1.22 billion	16	
Longwang		September 28 – October 1, 2005	84†	165 km/h (105 mph)	935 hPa (27.61 inHg)	Ryukyu Islands, Taiwan, East China	$971 million	149	
Kirogi		October 11 – 17, 2005	108	185 km/h (115 mph)	930 hPa (27.46 inHg)	None	None	None	
Chanchu		May 14 – 17, 2006	66	175 km/h (110 mph)	930 hPa (27.46 inHg)	Philippines, East China, Taiwan, Ryukyu Islands, South Korea	$879 million	309	
Ewiniar		July 3 – 5, 2006	54	185 km/h (115 mph)	930 hPa (27.46 inHg)	Caroline Islands, Ryukyu Islands, Korean Peninsula	$1.4 billion	181	
Xangsane		September 27, 2006	6	155 km/h (100 mph)	940 hPa (27.76 inHg)	Philippines, Indochina	$750 million	318	
Cimaron		October 28 – November 2, 2006	54†	185 km/h (115 mph)	920 hPa (27.17 inHg)	Philippines	$31 million	35	
Chebi		November 10 – 11, 2006	24	185 km/h (115 mph)	925 hPa (27.32 inHg)	Philippines	Unknown	1	
Utor		December 12, 2006	12	155 km/h (100 mph)	945 hPa (27.91 inHg)	Philippines	$15.8 million	38	
Yutu		May 19 – 21, 2007	60	175 km/h (110 mph)	935 hPa (27.61 inHg)	None	None	None	
Man-yi		July 11 – 13, 2007	42	175 km/h (110 mph)	930 hPa (27.46 inHg)	Japan	$105,000	16	
Usagi		July 31 – August 2, 2007	36	165 km/h (105 mph)	945 hPa (27.91 inHg)	Japan, Korean Peninsula	$225 million	None	
Nari		September 14 – 15, 2007	33	185 km/h (115 mph)	935 hPa (27.61 inHg)	Japan, South Korea	$393 million	23	
Wipha		September 17 – 18, 2007	36	185 km/h (115 mph)	925 hPa (27.32 inHg)	Taiwan, East China	$1.3 billion	20	
Kajiki		October 20, 2007	18	165 km/h (105 mph)	945 hPa (27.91 inHg)	None	None	None	
Nakri		May 29 – 30, 2008	42	185 km/h (115 mph)	930 hPa (27.46 inHg)	Mariana Islands, Japan	None	None	
Fengshen		June 21, 2008	12	165 km/h (105 mph)	945 hPa (27.91 inHg)	Philippines, South China	$430 million	1,371	
Sinlaku		September 10 – 13, 2008	90	185 km/h (115 mph)	935 hPa (27.61 inHg)	Philippines, Taiwan, East China, Japan	$1.1 billion	24	
Hagupit		September 23, 2008	24	165 km/h (105 mph)	935 hPa (27.61 inHg)	Philippines, Taiwan, South China, Vietnam	$3 billion	67	
Kujira		May 4 – 5, 2009	18	155 km/h (100 mph)	940 hPa (27.76 inHg)	Philippines	$27 million	28	
Vamco		August 19 – 21, 2009	54	165 km/h (105 mph)	945 hPa (27.91 inHg)	None	None	None	
Parma		September 30 – October 2, 2009	36	185 km/h (115 mph)	930 hPa (27.46 inHg)	Caroline Islands, Philippines, Taiwan, Vietnam	$617 million	500	
Lupit		October 17 – 19, 2009	60	175 km/h (110 mph)	930 hPa (27.46 inHg)	Philippines, Japan	None	None	

=== 2010s ===
Compared to the previous decade, only 46 typhoons reached the very strong category as its peak strength from 2010 to 2019. Some notable very strong typhoons include Typhoon Bopha in December 2012 which ravaged the Philippines, killing 1,901 people. Typhoon Faxai of 2019 impacted Japan, costing damages of an estimated US$10 billion, making it the sixth costliest typhoon on record. The longest duration of a storm to hold in a category of a very strong typhoon this decade was Typhoon Goni of 2015, a year where 12 very strong typhoons developed.

Name	Track	System dates	Duration (hours)	Sustained wind speeds	Pressure	Areas affected	Deaths	Damage (USD)	Refs
Fanapi (Inday)		September 17 – 18, 2010	27	175 km/h (110 mph)	935 hPa (27.61 inHg)	Taiwan, East China	105	$1 billion	
Malakas		September 24, 2010	6	155 km/h (100 mph)	945 hPa (27.91 inHg)	None	None	None	
Chaba (Katring)		October 27 – 28, 2010	36	175 km/h (110 mph)	935 hPa (27.61 inHg)	Japan	None	None	
Ma-on (Ineng)		July 15 – 17, 2011	54	175 km/h (110 mph)	935 hPa (27.61 inHg)	Mariana Islands, Japan	5	$5 million	
Muifa (Kabayan)		July 30 – August 5, 2011	144	175 km/h (110 mph)	930 hPa (27.46 inHg)	Ryukyu Islands, Korean Peninsula	22	$480 million	
Nanmadol (Mina)		August 25 – 27, 2011	42	165 km/h (105 mph)	940 hPa (27.76 inHg)	Philippines, Taiwan, East China	38	$1.49 billion	
Roke		September 20, 2011	12	155 km/h (100 mph)	940 hPa (27.76 inHg)	Japan	13	$1.2 billion	
Nalgae (Quiel)		September 30 – October 1, 2011	30	175 km/h (110 mph)	935 hPa (27.61 inHg)	Philippines, South China, Vietnam	18	$250 million	
Guchol		June 16 – 18, 2012	30	185 km/h (115 mph)	930 hPa (27.46 inHg)	Philippines, Japan	3	$100 million	
Bolaven (Julian)		August 24 – 26, 2012	42	185 km/h (115 mph)	910 hPa (26.87 inHg)	Ryukyu Islands, Korean Peninsula, Northeastern China	96	$3.59 billion	
Prapiroon (Nina)		October 10 – 12, 2012	30	165 km/h (105 mph)	940 hPa (27.76 inHg)	Japan	1	None	
Son-Tinh (Ofel)		October 27, 2012	30	155 km/h (100 mph)	945 hPa (27.91 inHg)	Vietnam, South China	42	$776 million	
Bopha (Pablo)		December 1 – 1, 2012	96†	185 km/h (115 mph)	930 hPa (27.46 inHg)	Philippines	1,901	$1.16 billion	
Soulik (Huaning)		July 9 – 12, 2013	63†	185 km/h (115 mph)	925 hPa (27.32 inHg)	Taiwan, Ryukyu Islands, East China	16	$600 million	
Danas (Ramil)		October 6 – 7, 2013	21	185 km/h (115 mph)	930 hPa (27.46 inHg)	Japan	None	$228,000	
Wipha (Tino)		October 13 – 14, 2013	24	165 km/h (105 mph)	930 hPa (27.46 inHg)	Japan	41	$409 million	
Neoguri (Florita)		July 5 – 8, 2014	75	185 km/h (115 mph)	930 hPa (27.46 inHg)	Japan	3	$632 million	
Rammasun (Glenda)		July 15 – 18, 2014	30†	165 km/h (105 mph)	935 hPa (27.61 inHg)	Philippines, South China, Vietnam	222	$8.03 billion	
Phanfone (Neneng)		October 2 – 5, 2014	90	175 km/h (110 mph)	935 hPa (27.61 inHg)	Japan	11	$100 million	
Higos		February 10, 2015	6	165 km/h (105 mph)	940 hPa (27.76 inHg)	None	None	None	
Dolphin		May 15 – 18, 2015	60	185 km/h (115 mph)	935 hPa (27.61 inHg)	Mariana Islands	1	$13.5 million	
Nangka		July 7 – 15, 2015	132†	185 km/h (115 mph)	925 hPa (27.32 inHg)	Mariana Islands, Japan	2	$209 million	
Chan-hom (Falcon)		July 9 – 10, 2015	36	165 km/h (105 mph)	935 hPa (27.46 inHg)	Mariana Islands, Taiwan, East China, Korean Peninsula	18	$1.58 billion	
Goni (Ineng)		August 17 – 24, 2015	147†	185 km/h (115 mph)	930 hPa (27.46 inHg)	Mariana Islands, Philippines, Taiwan, Japan, Korean Peninsula, East China	4	$1.05 billion	
Atsani		August 17 – 21, 2015	96	185 km/h (115 mph)	925 hPa (27.32 inHg)	None	None	None	
Krovanh		September 17 – 18, 2015	18	155 km/h (100 mph)	945 hPa (27.91 inHg)	None	None	None	
Mujigae (Kabayan)		October 4, 2015	12	185 km/h (115 mph)	935 hPa (27.46 inHg)	South China, Vietnam	29	$4.26 billion	
Koppu (Lando)		October 16 – 18, 2015	48	185 km/h (115 mph)	925 hPa (27.32 inHg)	Philippines, Taiwan	62	$313 million	
Champi		October 18 – 22, 2015	78†	175 km/h (110 mph)	930 hPa (27.46 inHg)	Mariana Islands	None	None	
In-fa (Marilyn)		November 20 – 22, 2015	48	175 km/h (110 mph)	935 hPa (27.61 inHg)	Caroline Islands	None	None	
Melor (Nona)		December 13 – 15, 2015	36†	175 km/h (110 mph)	935 hPa (27.61 inHg)	Philippines	51	$148 million	
Lionrock (Dindo)		August 24 – 29, 2016	96†	165 km/h (105 mph)	940 hPa (27.76 inHg)	Japan, North Korea	550	$3.94 billion	
Malakas (Gener)		September 15 – 19, 2016	72†	175 km/h (110 mph)	930 hPa (27.46 inHg)	Taiwan, Japan	1	$300 million	
Megi (Helen)		September 27, 2016	6	155 km/h (100 mph)	945 hPa (27.91 inHg)	Taiwan, Ryukyu Islands, East China	52	$1.57 billion	
Songda		October 10 – 12, 2016	54	185 km/h (115 mph)	925 hPa (27.32 inHg)	Pacific Northwest	None	None	
Sarika (Karen)		October 15, 2016	12	175 km/h (110 mph)	935 hPa (27.61 inHg)	Philippines, South China, Vietnam	37	$866 million	
Noru		July 30 – August 3, 2017	90	175 km/h (110 mph)	935 hPa (27.61 inHg)	Japan	2	$100 million	
Talim (Lannie)		September 13 – 15, 2017	42	175 km/h (110 mph)	935 hPa (27.61 inHg)	Taiwan, East China, Japan	5	$750 million	
Lan		October 20 – 22, 2017	54	185 km/h (115 mph)	915 hPa (27.02 inHg)	Japan	17	$2 billion	
Soulik		August 20 – 22, 2018	42	155 km/h (100 mph)	950 hPa (28.05 inHg)	Japan, Korean Peninsula	86	$125 million	
Cimaron		August 22, 2018	12	155 km/h (100 mph)	950 hPa (28.05 inHg)	Japan	None	$30.6 million	
Lingling (Liwayway)		September 4 – 6, 2019	36	175 km/h (110 mph)	940 hPa (27.76 inHg)	Ryukyu Islands, Korean Peninsula	8	$236 million	
Faxai		September 7 – 8, 2019	27	155 km/h (100 mph)	955 hPa (28.20 inHg)	Japan	3	$10 billion	
Bualoi		October 21 – 23, 2019	66	185 km/h (115 mph)	935 hPa (27.61 inHg)	Caroline Islands, Mariana Islands, Japan	13	$200 million	
Fengshen		November 15 – 16, 2019	36	155 km/h (100 mph)	965 hPa (28.50 inHg)	Mariana Islands	None	None	
Kammuri (Tisoy)		December 2, 2019	18	165 km/h (105 mph)	950 hPa (28.05 inHg)	Philippines	12	$116 million	
Phanfone (Ursula)		December 24 – 26, 2019	66	165 km/h (105 mph)	970 hPa (28.64 inHg)	Caroline Islands, Philippines	50	$67.2 million	

=== 2020s ===
As of the 2024 season, only 21 typhoons have had a peak classification of very strong typhoon. Some notable very strong typhons for this decade are Typhoon Vamco of 2020, which worsened the floods in Vietnam and the Philippines. Typhoon Noru of 2022 which ravaged the Philippines, causing widespread agricultural damages. The costliest very strong typhoon so far is Doksuri of 2023, which caused $28.4 billion of damages. The deadliest tropical cyclone so far for this decade is Gaemi of 2024, which killed 152 people. While the longest duration of a storm to hold in a category of a very strong typhoon this decade was Khanun of 2023.

Name	Track	System dates	Duration (hours)	Sustained wind speeds	Pressure	Areas affected	Deaths	Damage (USD)	Refs
Vongfong		May 14, 2020	12	155 km/h (100 mph)	960 hPa (28.35 inHg)	Philippines	5	$50 million	
Bavi		August 26, 2020	12	155 km/h (100 mph)	950 hPa (28.05 inHg)	Taiwan, Ryukyu Islands, Korean Peninsula	1	$11.7 million	
Maysak		August 31 – September 2, 2020	42	175 km/h (110 mph)	955 hPa (27.61 inHg)	Japan, Korean Peninsula	46	$100 million	
Molave		October 27, 2020	24	165 km/h (105 mph)	940 hPa (27.76 inHg)	Philippines, Indochina	71	$743 million	
Vamco		November 14, 2020	6	155 km/h (100 mph)	955 hPa (28.20 inHg)	Philippines, Vietnam	102	$1.06 billion	
In-fa		July 21 – 22, 2021	18	155 km/h (100 mph)	950 hPa (28.05 inHg)	Philippines, Ryukyu Islands, Taiwan, East China	6	$2.04 billion	
Nyatoh		December 2 – 3, 2021	24	185 km/h (115 mph)	925 hPa (27.32 inHg)	None	None	None	
Malakas		April 12 – 13, 2022	42	165 km/h (105 mph)	945 hPa (27.91 inHg)	Guam, Caroline Islands, Bonin Islands	None	None	
Muifa		September 11 – 13, 2022	21	155 km/h (100 mph)	950 hPa (28.05 inHg)	Philippines, Taiwan, Yaeyama Islands, East China	2	$437 million	
Noru		September 24 – 25, 2022	24†	175 km/h (110 mph)	940 hPa (27.76 inHg)	Philippines, Vietnam, Laos, Cambodia, Thailand	40	$313 million	
Doksuri		July 24 – 26, 2023	57	185 km/h (115 mph)	925 hPa (27.32 inHg)	Philippines, Taiwan, China	137	$28.6 billion	
Khanun		July 31 – August 2, 2023	69	195 km/h (120 mph)	930 hPa (27.46 inHg)	Ryukyu Islands, Taiwan	12	$98.1 million	
Lan		August 11, 2023	21	165 km/h (105 mph)	940 hPa (27.76 inHg)	Bonin Islands, Japan	1	$500 million	
Haikui		September 3, 2023	2	155 km/h (105 mph)	955 hPa (28.20 inHg)	Northern Mariana Islands, Taiwan, China, Philippines, Hong Kong	16	$2.55 billion	
Koinu		October 2 – 3, 2023	30†	165 km/h (105 mph)	940 hPa (27.76 inHg)	Northern Mariana Islands, Philippines, Taiwan	1	$28.9 million	
Gaemi		July 24, 2024	24	165 km/h (105 mph)	935 hPa (27.61 inHg)	Philippines, Yaeyama Islands, Taiwan, Indonesia, Vietnam, Singapore, North Korea	152	$4.57 billion	
Ampil		August 16, 2024	3	165 km/h (105 mph)	950 hPa (27.76 inHg)	Japan, Alaska	4	Minimal	
Shanshan		August 27, 2024	12	175 km/h (110 mph)	935 hPa (27.61 inHg)	Japan, South Korea	8	$6 billion	
Kong-rey		October 29 – 31, 2024	50	175 km/h (110 mph)	925 hPa (27.32 inHg)	Philippines, Taiwan, China, South Korea, Japan	3	$167 million	
Yinxing		November 6 – 7, 2024	42	185 km/h (115 mph)	935 hPa (27.91 inHg)	Philippines, Vietnam	3	$9.63 million	
Usagi		November 11 – 13, 2024	24	175 km/h (110 mph)	940 hPa (27.76 inHg)	Philippines, Taiwan	1	$9.56 million	
Neoguri		September 20-21, 2025 & September 27-28, 2025	†	185 km/h (115 mph)	925 hPa (27.32 inHg)	Wake Island, Aleutian Islands	None	None	
Halong		October 7-8, 2025		185 km/h (115 mph)	935 hPa (27.91 inHg)	Bonin Islands, Izu Islands, Kantō region, Alaska	2	$125 million	
Kalmaegi		November 5-6, 2025		165 km/h (105 mph)	950 hPa (27.76 inHg)	Caroline Islands, Philippines, Vietnam, Laos, Cambodia, Thailand	288	$585 million	
Fung-wong	Fung-wong 2025 path	November 9, 2025		175 km/h (110 mph)	935 hPa (27.91 inHg)	Caroline Islands, Mariana Islands, Philippines, Taiwan, Eastern China, Ryukyu Islands	34	$104 million	
Mekkhala		June 22, 2026		185 km/h (115 mph)	925 hPa (27.32 inHg)	Caroline Islands, Mariana Islands, Philippines, Taiwan, Japan	10	$19.3 million	

== Climatology ==
Very strong typhoons by month
Month	Number of storms
January	0
February	1
March	1
April	3
May	11
June	6
July	21
August	24
September	30
October	28
November	11
December	8

Very strong typhoons by decade
Period	Number of storms
1976–79	0
1980s	0
1990s	24
2000s	66
2010s	46
2020s	33

== See also ==
- Typhoon
- Pacific typhoon season
- 2026 Pacific typhoon season
