= List of storms named Rolly =

The name Rolly has been used for three tropical cyclones in the Philippine Area of Responsibility by PAGASA in the Western Pacific Ocean.

- Typhoon Ma-on (2004) (T0422, 26W, Rolly) – became a super typhoon and made landfall on the Izu Peninsula, Honshū, Japan.
- Tropical Depression Rolly (2008) – weak and short-lived tropical depression that affected Philippines.
- Typhoon Goni (2020) (T2019, 22W, Rolly) – made landfall as a Category 5–equivalent super typhoon on Catanduanes in the Philippines and in Vietnam as a tropical storm.

The name Rolly was retired following the 2020 Pacific typhoon season and was replaced with Romina.
