= Typhoon Hagibis =

Pacific typhoon in 2019

Typhoon Hagibis Reiwa 1 East Japan Typhoon
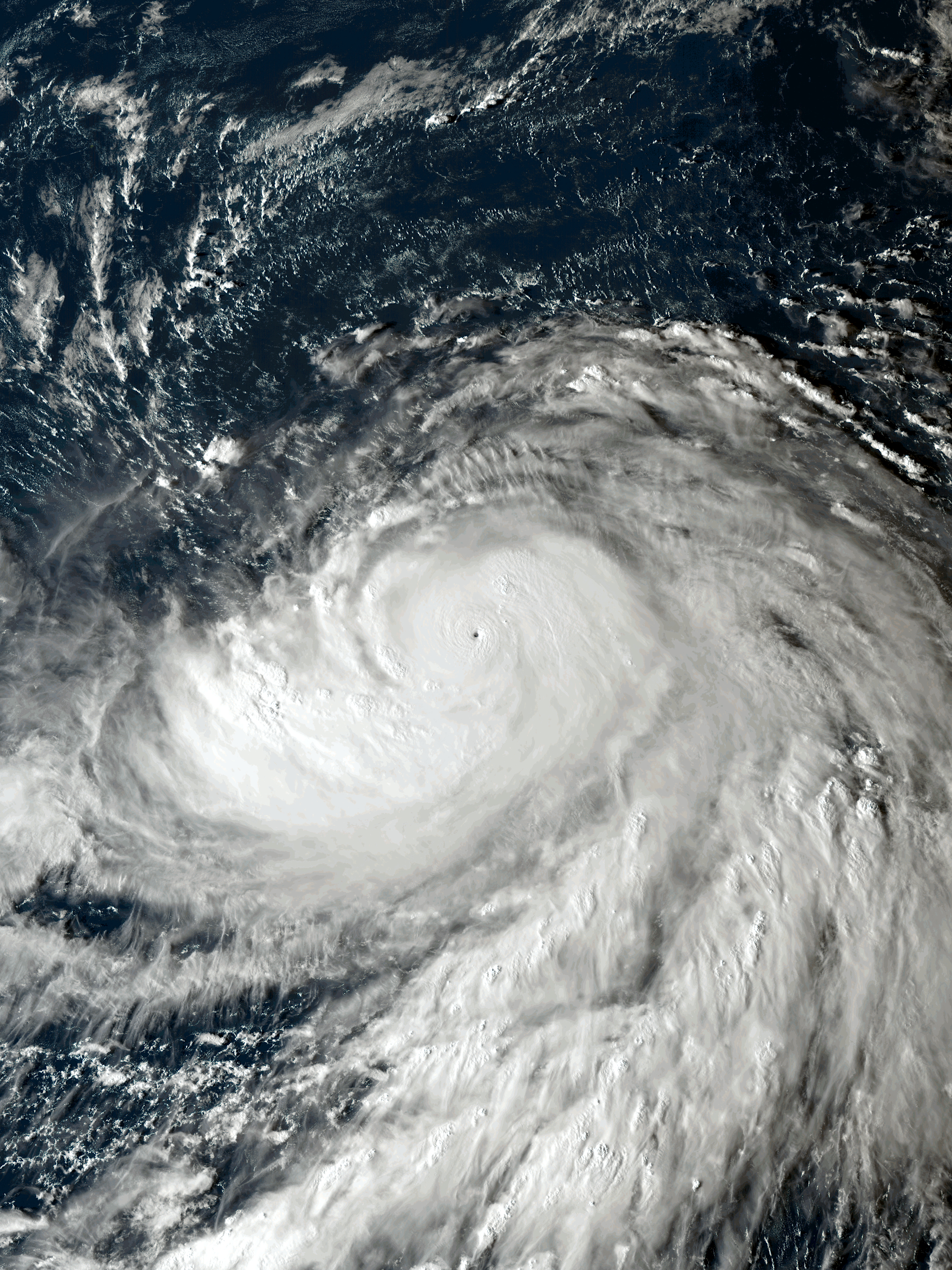
- Hagibis near peak intensity over the Mariana Islands on October 7

Meteorological history
- Formed: October 4, 2019
- Extratropical: October 13, 2019
- Dissipated: October 14, 2019

Violent typhoon
- 10-minute sustained (JMA)
- Highest winds: 195 km/h (120 mph)
- Lowest pressure: 915 hPa (mbar); 27.02 inHg

Category 5-equivalent super typhoon
- 1-minute sustained (SSHWS/JTWC)
- Highest winds: 295 km/h (185 mph)
- Lowest pressure: 890 hPa (mbar); 26.28 inHg

Overall effects
- Fatalities: 139 total
- Missing: 3
- Damage: $17.3 billion (2019 USD) (Second-costliest typhoon on record and costliest in Japanese history in nominal terms)
- Areas affected: Mariana Islands, Japan, Russia, Alaska
- IBTrACS
- Part of the 2019 Pacific typhoon season

Typhoon Hagibis, (Note: The name Hagibis (Tagalog: hagibis, Tagalog: [hɐ.ɣɪ.ˈbɪs]) was contributed by the Philippines and means "rapidity, swiftness" in Tagalog.) known in Japan as Typhoon No.19 or the Reiwa 1 East Japan Typhoon (令和元年東日本台風, Reiwa Gannen Higashi-Nihon Taifū), was an extremely large, powerful and costly tropical cyclone that caused widespread destruction in Japan and is one of the costliest typhoons on record. The nineteenth named storm, ninth typhoon, and third super typhoon of the 2019 Pacific typhoon season, it was the strongest typhoon to strike mainland Japan in decades, and one of the largest typhoons ever recorded, with a peak gale-force diameter of 825 nautical miles (949 mi; 1,528 km). The typhoon raised global media attention, as it greatly affected the 2019 Rugby World Cup being hosted by Japan. With a death toll of 139, Hagibis was also the deadliest typhoon to strike Japan since Typhoon Fran in 1976.

Hagibis caused severe flooding and extreme weather that have caused serious problems. Hagibis developed from a tropical disturbance first monitored a couple hundred miles north of the Marshall Islands on October 2, 2019. The Joint Typhoon Warning Center (JTWC) and the Japan Meteorological Agency (JMA) began issuing advisories on Tropical Depression 20W. Little change occurred as it travelled west toward the Mariana Islands over the next day, but on October 5, it began quickly organizing and early that day, the system was issued with the name Hagibis by the JMA. Environmental conditions became extremely favourable for further development, and Hagibis underwent a period of explosive intensification on October 6, and became a Category 5-equivalent super typhoon in under 12 hours, the second such system of the 2019 season, before passing through the Northern Mariana Islands at peak intensity, with 10-minute sustained winds of 105 kn (195 km/h; 120 mph) and a central pressure of 915 hPa (27.02 inHg). Shortly afterwards, it underwent an eyewall replacement cycle, weakening before reaching a second peak intensity on October 8. Traveling toward Japan, Hagibis encountered unfavorable conditions and steady weakening commenced. On October 12, Hagibis made landfall on Japan on the Izu Peninsula near Shizuoka and the Greater Tokyo Area. By the next day, Hagibis became an extratropical low and the JMA and JTWC issued their final advisories on the system, dissipating on October 14 as it was absorbed into a low to its northeast.

Hagibis caused catastrophic destruction across much of eastern Japan. Hagibis spawned a large tornado on October 12, which struck the Ichihara area of Chiba Prefecture during the onset of Hagibis; the tornado, along with a 5.7 magnitude earthquake off the coast, caused additional damage to those areas that were damaged by Hagibis. Hagibis caused more than $17 billion (2019 USD) in damages, making it, at the time, the costliest typhoon on record until it was beaten by Typhoon Doksuri of 2023 (when not adjusted for inflation).

== Meteorological history ==
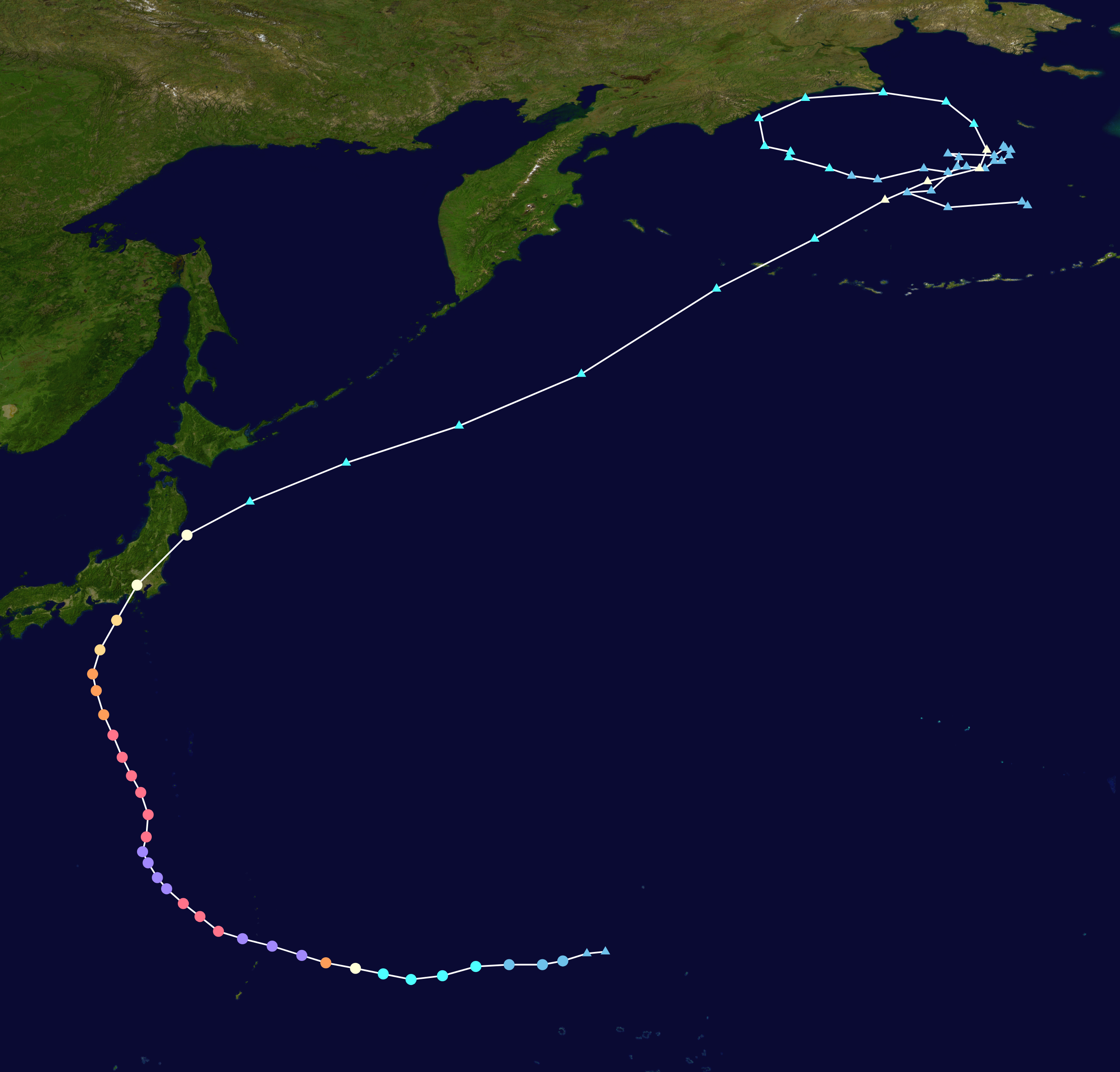
Map plotting the storm's track and intensity, according to the Saffir–Simpson scale Map key Saffir–Simpson scale Tropical depression (≤38 mph, ≤62 km/h) Tropical storm (39–73 mph, 63–118 km/h) Category 1 (74–95 mph, 119–153 km/h) Category 2 (96–110 mph, 154–177 km/h) Category 3 (111–129 mph, 178–208 km/h) Category 4 (130–156 mph, 209–251 km/h) Category 5 (≥157 mph, ≥252 km/h) Unknown Storm type Tropical cyclone Subtropical cyclone Extratropical cyclone, remnant low, tropical disturbance, or monsoon depression

In early October, a poorly organized and broad area of thunderstorms persisted over 1,500 km (930 mi) east of Guam. With favorable atmospheric conditions and warm sea surface temperatures prevailing, the Joint Typhoon Warning Center (JTWC) began noting the possibility of tropical cyclogenesis on October 4, eventually issuing a Tropical Cyclone Formation Alert the next day. The system initially remained stationary, consolidating a center of circulation in the lower levels of the atmosphere. The Japan Meteorological Agency (JMA) declared the disturbance a tropical depression at 00:00 UTC on October 5. At the time, the system was 1,030 km (640 mi) northeast of Pohnpei, quickly developing cumulonimbus clouds around its center and establishing conducive outflow as it tracked west around the periphery of an area of high pressure. The tropical depression strengthened into a tropical storm by 18:00 UTC on October 5 while 1,560 km (970 mi) east of Guam, gaining the name Hagibis. A dominant curved rainband had begun to wrap around the center of Hagibis, signifying further organization. On October 6, the storm made a slight turn towards the west-southwest and began an accelerated period of intensification within an environment with low wind shear and atop warm waters, reaching severe tropical storm intensity at 12:00 UTC and typhoon strength six hours later as it developed a small eye.

Typhoon Hagibis entered a period of explosive intensification on October 7, with its central pressure falling 55 hPa (mbar; 1.62 inHg) in 12 hours according to the JMA. Estimates from the JTWC suggested a 185 km/h (115 mph) increase in the storm's maximum winds in 22 hours. During this phase, Hagibis maintained a pinhole eye 9 km (5.6 mi) across, encircled by a highly compact and sharply defined eyewall. The rate of intensification was among the fastest observed in the Western Pacific. According to the JMA, Hagibis reached its peak intensity at 09:00 UTC on October 7 with a minimum pressure of 915 hPa (mbar; 27.02 inHg) and 10-minute sustained winds of 195 km/h (121 mph); Hagibis would maintain this intensity for 72 hours. The JTWC classified Hagibis as a Category 5-equivalent super typhoon (Note: A super typhoon is defined as a tropical cyclone with one-minute sustained winds of at least 240 km/h (150 mph).) early on October 7, and later assessed peak 1-minute sustained winds of 295 km/h (185 mph), while also estimating a pressure of 890 hPa (mbar; 26.28 inHg), as Hagibis passed just south of Anatahan in the Northern Mariana Islands. Hagibis was unusually rapid in its trek through the Mariana Islands, traveling with a forward motion of 27–34 km/h (17–21 mph).

Typhoon Hagibis making landfall in Japan on October 12

After passing the Mariana Islands, Hagibis began an eyewall replacement cycle, which halted further strengthening. As the primary eyewall began to erode, the JTWC downgraded the typhoon to a Category 4-equivalent super typhoon at 00:00 UTC on October 8. Several hours later, Hagibis completed the eyewall replacement cycle and reintensified to Category 5-equivalent intensity, attaining a secondary peak intensity with 1-minute sustained winds of 280 km/h (175 mph). Steady weakening began to ensue after as Hagibis began encountering increasingly unfavourable conditions and its outer rainbands began to erode. After gradual weakening, Hagibis made landfall on Shizuoka as a Category 2-equivalent typhoon, with 1-minute sustained winds of 155 km/h (95 mph), at around 08:30 UTC on October 12. While over Japan, Hagibis became disorganized from high wind shear and eventually became extratropical on October 13. The remnants accelerated and moved over the Northern Pacific Ocean before being absorbed by a separate low to its northeast the following day over the Gulf of Alaska.

== Preparations ==
Significant typhoons with special names (from the Japan Meteorological Agency)
Name	Number	Japanese name
Ida	T4518	Makurazaki Typhoon (枕崎台風)
Louise	T4523	Akune Typhoon (阿久根台風)
Marie	T5415	Tōya Maru Typhoon (洞爺丸台風)
Ida	T5822	Kanogawa Typhoon (狩野川台風)
Sarah	T5914	Miyakojima Typhoon (宮古島台風)
Vera	T5915	Isewan Typhoon (伊勢湾台風)
Nancy	T6118	2nd Muroto Typhoon (第2室戸台風)
Cora	T6618	2nd Miyakojima Typhoon (第2宮古島台風)
Della	T6816	3rd Miyakojima Typhoon (第3宮古島台風)
Babe	T7709	Okinoerabu Typhoon (沖永良部台風)
Faxai	T1915	Reiwa 1 Bōsō Peninsula Typhoon (令和元年房総半島台風)
Hagibis	T1919	Reiwa 1 East Japan Typhoon (令和元年東日本台風)

=== Mariana Islands ===
On October 7, U.S. president Donald Trump approved an emergency declaration and evacuation orders for Guam and the Mariana Islands ahead of Hagibis, with typhoon warnings issued on the islands of Saipan, Tinian, Alamagan, and Pagan.

=== Japan ===
Forecasts across eastern, western, and northern Japan called for strong winds and torrential rain that would likely cause flooding and mudslides. JR Group, Japan Airlines, and All Nippon Airways suspended services. JMA weather forecaster, Yasushi Kajiwara, said, "It is a level 5 situation; some sort of disaster may have already taken place. People are strongly advised to act to protect their lives right away." Evacuation orders have been issued to more than 800,000 households across 11 prefectures. Over 230,000 people took the advice to head to evacuation shelters.

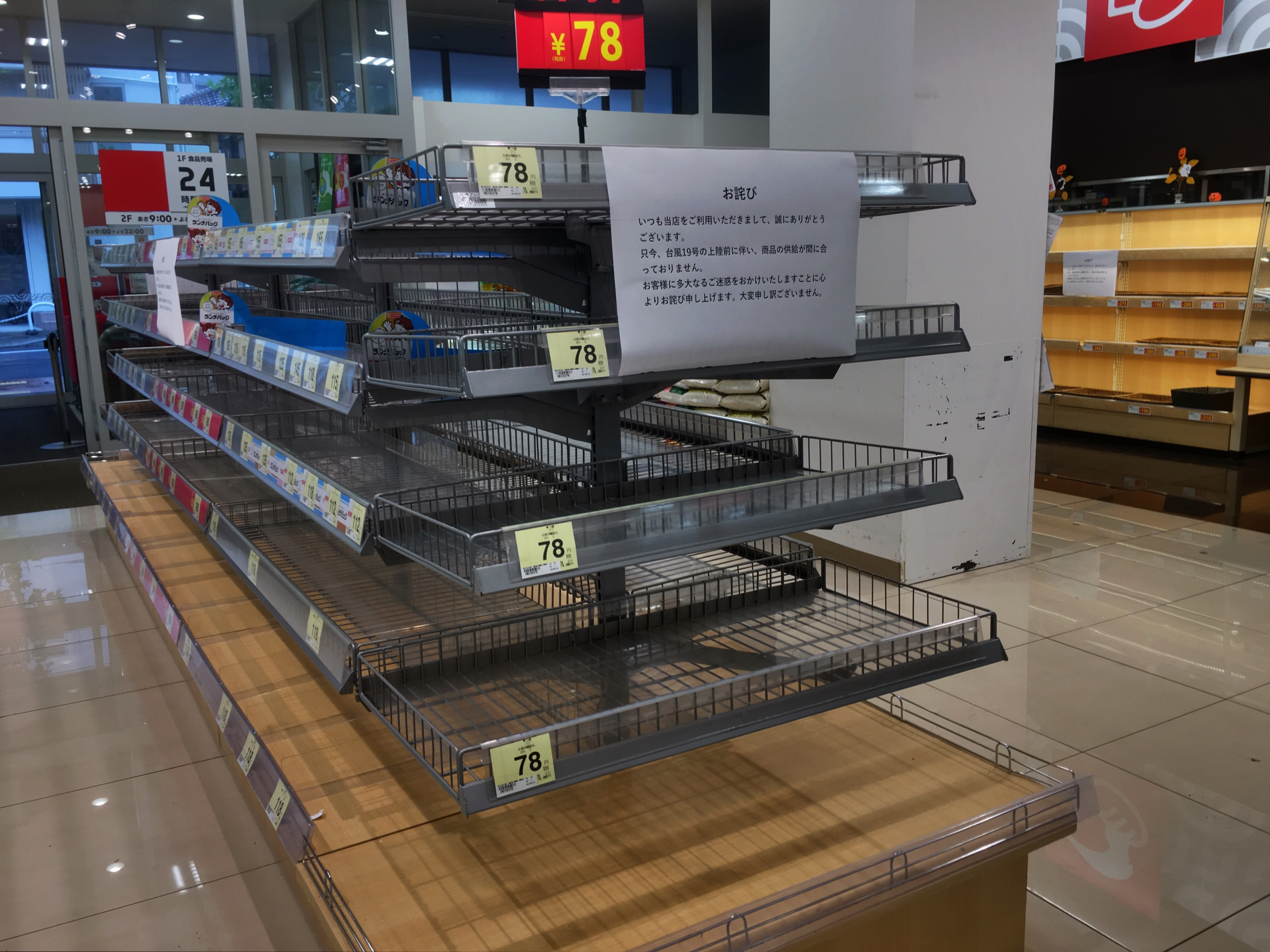
Shelves in shops around Tokyo were quickly cleared, as people bought supplies ahead of Hagibis making landfall.

The typhoon had effects on several major sporting events occurring in Japan. Three matches of the 2019 Rugby World Cup were cancelled due to Hagibis, including the Pool B matches between New Zealand and Italy, and Canada and Namibia, and the Pool C match between England and France. This marked the first time that matches have been cancelled in the history of the Rugby World Cup. All cancelled matches were counted as draws: the cancelled fixture effectively eliminated Italy from the tournament, as they had a chance to potentially qualify for the knockout stage with a sufficient margin of victory against New Zealand.

On October 11, it was announced that the Saturday practice session for the 2019 Japanese Grand Prix at Suzuka Circuit would be cancelled, and the Saturday qualifying session was postponed to Sunday morning prior to the race. The F4 Japanese Championship cancelled its round at the circuit as well. Nippon Professional Baseball postponed both Game 4 Climax Series games in the 2019 Pacific League Climax Series and the 2019 Central League Climax Series, despite the games being played indoors in domed stadiums. (Note: The Belluna Dome, where the 2019 Pacific League Climax Series was being held, lacks a wall behind the stands despite being a closed roof stadium.) Both games were planned to take place on Saturday, October 12, one in Tokorozawa, Saitama, and the other in Bunkyō, Tokyo. The games were instead played the next day on Sunday, October 13.

== Impact ==
Costliest known Pacific typhoons (adjusted for inflation)
Rank	Typhoon	Season	Damage (2025 USD)
1	4 Doksuri	2023	$30.1 billion
2	4 Mireille	1991	$23.6 billion
3	5 Hagibis	2019	$21.8 billion
4	5 Saomai	2000	$17.3 billion
5	5 Jebi	2018	$16.7 billion
6	4 Songda	2004	$15.9 billion
7	5 Yagi	2024	$15.1 billion
8	2 Fitow	2013	$14.4 billion
9	4 Faxai	2019	$12.6 billion
10	4 Tokage	2004	$12.1 billion

=== Mariana Islands ===
The Mariana Islands were glanced by Typhoon Hagibis. Acting Governor Arnold Palacios began giving "all-clear" signals based on information from the National Weather Service and CNMI Emergency Operations Center. Communities have been cleaning up debris and all evacuation centers are now closed. On October 12, most utilities were restored and had started reopening.

=== Japan ===
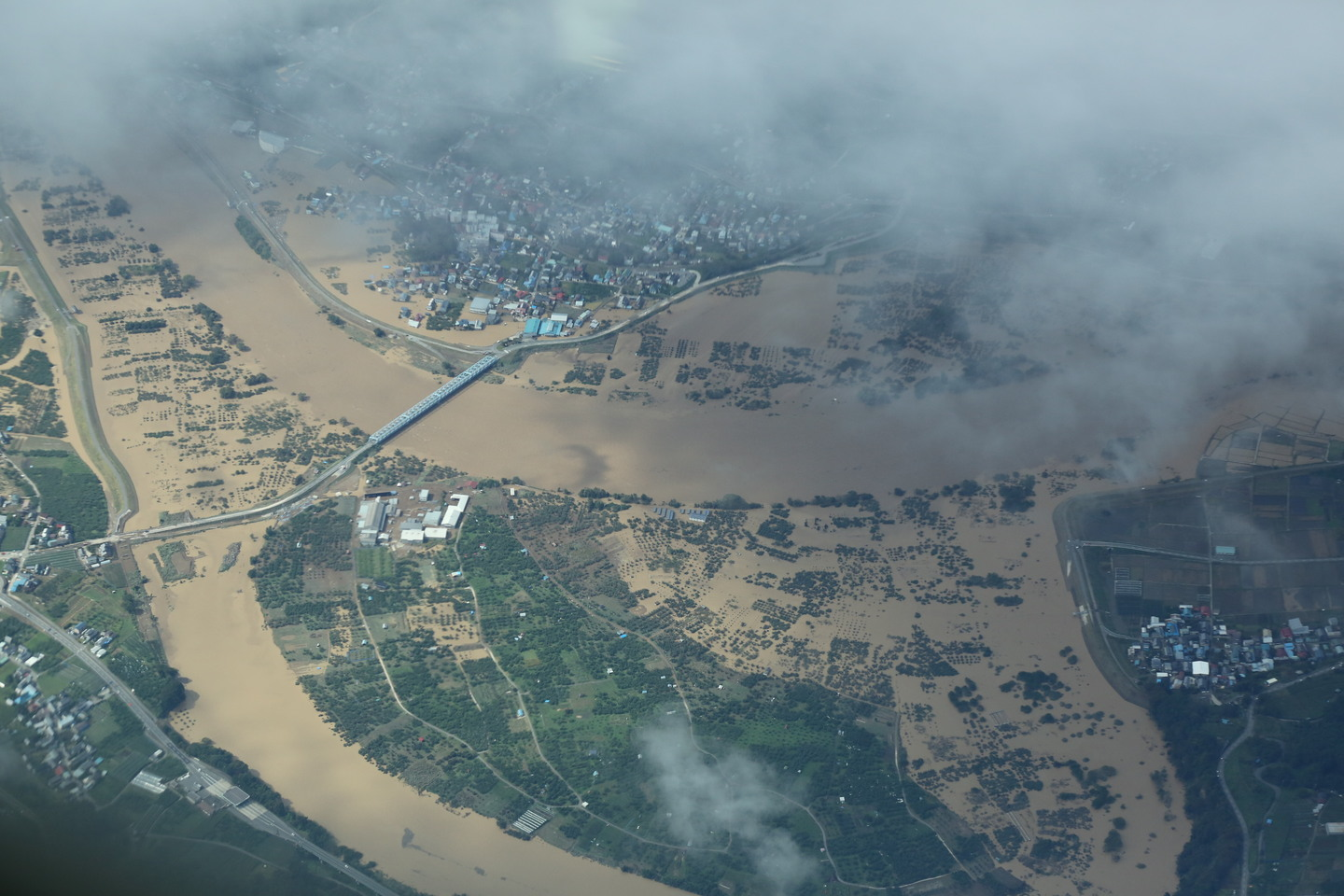
An aerial view of flooding in Nagano, Japan.

Early on October 12, a tornado struck Ichihara City, which killed one person and left two people injured. In the afternoon, some areas of Japan suffered heavy flooding, with tens of thousands of homes without power. The Japan Meteorological Agency warned that high winds could cause further flooding and landslides. The agency issued evacuation advisories in high-risk areas. Over 76 centimetres (30 in) of rain fell in parts of Japan. Japan's Fire and Disaster Management Agency stated that at 139 have been confirmed dead of which 118 were directly caused and 21 post-disaster and 3 people missing, with 388 people injured by the storm, 48 of which seriously. More than 270,000 households lost power across the country. Ten trains of the Hokuriku Shinkansen Line in Nagano City were inundated by flood waters, leading to the scrapping of the trains and a loss of ¥32.8 billion (US$300 million). Total economic losses across the nation were huge, which stood at ¥1.88 trillion (US$17.3 billion).

At around 18:22 JST (09:22 UTC) on October 12, a magnitude 5.7 earthquake occurred off the coast of Chiba Prefecture, worsening the dangerous conditions already created by Hagibis.

Hagibis also led to the cancellation of several sporting events, such as three Rugby World Cup 2019 matches; involving Namibia versus Canada, New Zealand versus Italy, and England versus France, and the third practice and qualifying for the Japanese Grand Prix. Qualifying for the Grand Prix was rescheduled to the Sunday morning before the race.

== Aftermath ==
=== Retirement ===
Due to the severe impacts of Typhoon Hagibis in Japan, the name Hagibis was officially retired during the 52nd Annual Session, organized by the ESCAP/WMO Typhoon Committee in February 2020. In February 2021, the Typhoon Committee subsequently chose Ragasa as its replacement name.

== See also ==
- Weather of 2019
- Tropical cyclones in 2019

Historical comparisons to Hagibis:

- Typhoon Ida (1958) – An intense, but deadlier typhoon that also affected similar areas; known as the Kanogawa Typhoon in Japan.
- Typhoon Tip (1979) – The largest and most intense tropical cyclone on record, which took a similar path to Hagibis.
- Typhoon Mireille (1991) – A powerful typhoon that hit Japan and became the costliest typhoon on record, adjusted for inflation.
- Typhoon Higos (2002) – A strong typhoon which was slightly weaker than Hagibis but had a comparable track and also affected Japan.
- Typhoon Ma-on (2004) – Another intense typhoon which also had a similar track to Hagibis and also affected the Japanese Grand Prix.
- Typhoon Phanfone (2014) – Another strong typhoon that made a comparable trajectory; also affected the Japanese Grand Prix.
- Typhoon Jebi (2018) – The costliest typhoon on record in Japan in terms of insured losses.
- Typhoon Faxai (2019) – Another powerful typhoon which struck Japan a few weeks before Hagibis.

== Notes ==
Preceded by Mireille	Costliest Pacific typhoons on record (nominal); 2019	Succeeded by Doksuri
