= Typhoon Ma-on (2004) =

Pacific typhoon in 2004

Typhoon Ma-on (Rolly)
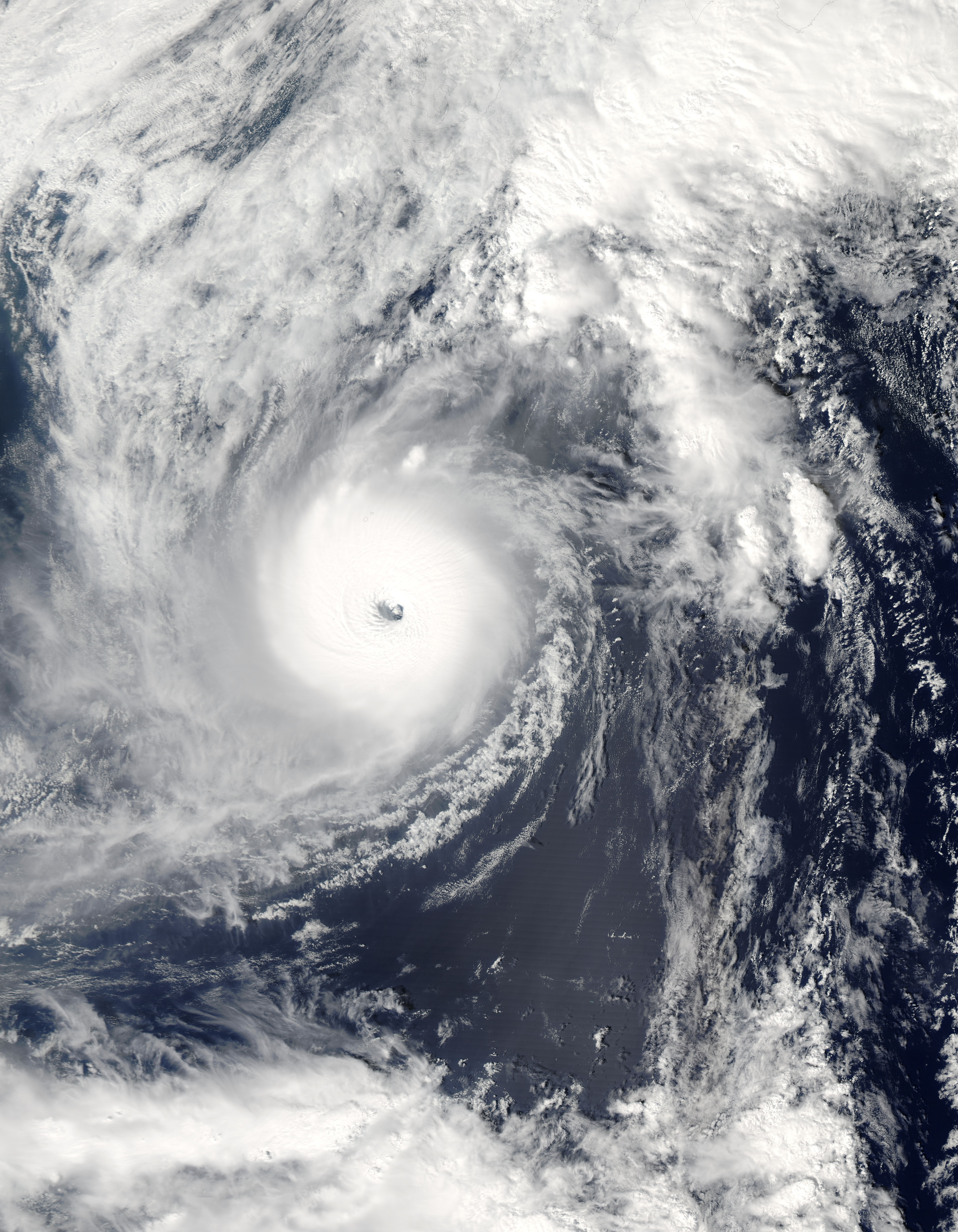
- Typhoon Ma-on on October 8

Meteorological history
- Formed: October 3, 2004
- Dissipated: October 10, 2004

Very strong typhoon
- 10-minute sustained (JMA)
- Highest winds: 185 km/h (115 mph)
- Lowest pressure: 920 hPa (mbar); 27.17 inHg

Category 5-equivalent super typhoon
- 1-minute sustained (SSHWS/JTWC)
- Highest winds: 260 km/h (160 mph)
- Lowest pressure: 898 hPa (mbar); 26.52 inHg

Overall effects
- Fatalities: 7
- Missing: 2
- Damage: $623 million (2004 USD)
- Areas affected: Japan, Alaska
- IBTrACS
- Part of the 2004 Pacific typhoon season

Typhoon Ma-on, (Note: The name Ma-on (Cantonese: 馬鞍, [maː˨˧ ɔːn˥]) was contributed by Hong Kong and refers to Ma On Shan in Cantonese.) known in the Philippines as Typhoon Rolly, was a powerful typhoon that produced record breaking wind gusts across the Tokyo Metropolitan Area during early October 2004. It was the strongest typhoon to hit the region since Typhoon Higos in 2002. The twenty-second named storm of the 2004 Pacific typhoon season, Ma-on was the second of three consecutive storms to hit Japan during the period between late-September to mid-October 2004.

== Meteorological history ==
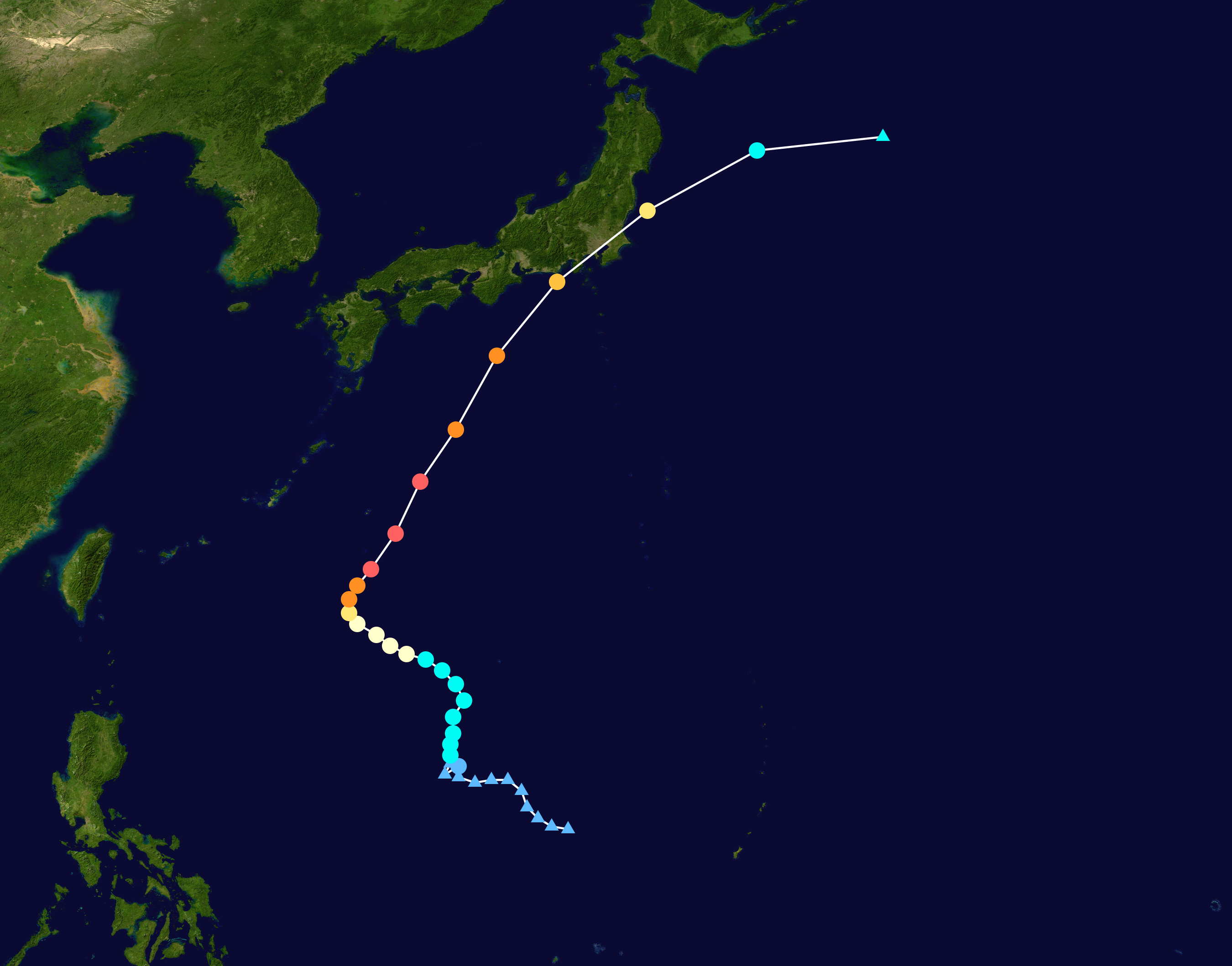
Map plotting the storm's track and intensity, according to the Saffir–Simpson scale Map key Saffir–Simpson scale Tropical depression (≤38 mph, ≤62 km/h) Tropical storm (39–73 mph, 63–118 km/h) Category 1 (74–95 mph, 119–153 km/h) Category 2 (96–110 mph, 154–177 km/h) Category 3 (111–129 mph, 178–208 km/h) Category 4 (130–156 mph, 209–251 km/h) Category 5 (≥157 mph, ≥252 km/h) Unknown Storm type Tropical cyclone Subtropical cyclone Extratropical cyclone, remnant low, tropical disturbance, or monsoon depression

Typhoon Ma-on originated from a weak low-pressure area accompanied by persistent convection, or thunderstorms, north-northwest of Guam on September 29, 2004. Though environmental conditions featured weak wind shear and modest diffluence, favoring tropical cyclogenesis, the convection was cyclical and the system did not develop much over the following two days. Over the first three days of October, organization fluctuated as semi-persistent convection appeared over the circulation center. On October 3, a QuikScat satellite pass revealed a well-developed circulation while a ship 555 km (345 mi) south of the low reported 45 km/h (28 mph) winds. The Japan Meteorological Agency (JMA) began monitoring the low as a tropical depression at 06:00 UTC. Twelve hours later, the depression crossed 135°E and entered the Philippine Atmospheric, Geophysical and Astronomical Services Administration's (PAGASA) area of responsibility, receiving the local name Rolly from the agency. Becoming nearly stationary, the system turned due north late on October 3. At 00:00 UTC on October 4, the Joint Typhoon Warning Center (JTWC) classified the system as Tropical Depression 26W; the newly designated cyclone was situated over the Philippine Sea roughly 1,145 km (711 mi) west-northwest of Guam at this time. Six hours later, both the JMA and JTWC analyzed the depression and concluded it had become a tropical storm; the JMA assigning it the name Ma-on. Slow organization of Ma-on ensued over the following two days as it moved north and later northwest along the edge of a high-pressure area. The JTWC estimated Ma-on to have reached typhoon status around 06:00 UTC on October 6, with the JMA following suit 12 hours later.

Synoptic patterns changed dramatically on October 7 as a trough emerged off the coast of East China and prompted Ma-on to turn northeast. Simultaneously, it provided a greatly enhanced poleward outflow channel toward Japan. The shift in motion was also accompanied by a period of rapid intensification, with a well-defined eye forming. Over the 24 hour-period from 18:00 to 18:00 UTC October 6–7, Ma-on's barometric pressure dropped from 965 mb (hPa; 28.50 inHg) to 920 mb (hPa; 27.17 inHg). The end of this phase marked the peak intensity of the typhoon, with winds reaching 185 km/h (115 mph). The JTWC estimated Ma-on to have been a significantly stronger storm with one-minute sustained winds topping out at 260 km/h (160 mph) at 00:00 UTC on October 8. This ranked it as a Category 5-equivalent typhoon on the Saffir–Simpson hurricane wind scale. They also assessed the pressure to have decreased to 898 mb (hPa; 26.52 inHg). Not long after reaching this intensity, Ma-on's eye began to shrink and become ragged. Acceleration to the northeast, with its forward speed reaching 54 km/h (34 mph), ensued throughout the day and weakening ensued. Convection became increasingly asymmetric with dry air impinging on the southwestern semicircle, indicating the beginning of extratropical transition. The typhoon made landfall along the Izu Peninsula of Japan around 07:00 UTC on October 9, with winds of 150 km/h (93 mph) and a central pressure of 950 mb (hPa; 28.06 inHg). The JTWC estimated Ma-on to have been a Category 3-equivalent with one-minute sustained winds of 195 km/h (121 mph). Roughly six hours after striking Japan, the rapidly weakening typhoon re-emerged over the Pacific Ocean. The system completed its extratropical transition later on October 9 as it weakened below typhoon intensity.

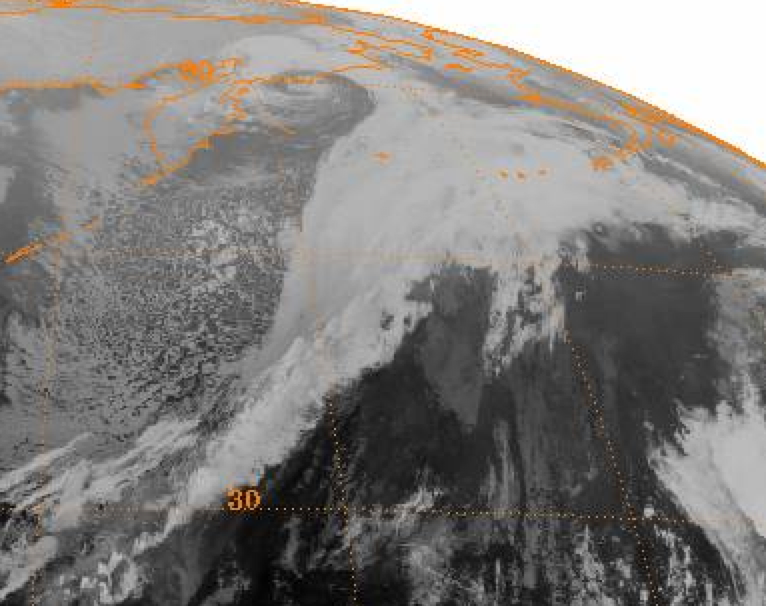
Satellite image of a rejuvenated extratropical Ma-on on October 17 over the western Bering Sea.

After losing a defined low-level circulation early on October 10, Ma-on's the remnant trough continued eastward across the North Pacific. More than a week later, by October 18, the storm moved over the Bering Sea and began to intensify rapidly as conditions favored bombogenesis of the baroclinic system. It is not certain whether this system was predominantly the remnants of Ma-on or another non-tropical system which had its origins near Norway and traversed Eurasia. Regardless of its dominant origin the storm moved across the central Aleutian Islands with a pressure of 978 mb (hPa; 28.88 inHg) on October 17 and doubled back to the west throughout the next day. As it moved over the Gulf of Anadyr, it quickly deepened to an exceptionally powerful 941 mb (hPa; 27.79 inHg). The intensification resulted from the influx of warm, moist air directly associated with the remnants of Ma-on combining with cold air from an upper-level low over the Russian Far East being entrained into the southeastern portion of the circulation. Winds up to typhoon-force occurred over a large swath of the Bering Sea and portions of western coastal Alaska. Situated 640 km (400 mi) west of Nome, Alaska, the powerful storm subsequently weakened and slowed on October 19. By October 20, the system filled to 980 mb (hPa; 28.95 inHg) low and reached a position 640 km (400 mi) west of Kotzebue, Alaska. Over the subsequent four days, the low meandered in the same general area and was last noted on October 24.

== Preparations, impact and aftermath ==
=== Japan ===
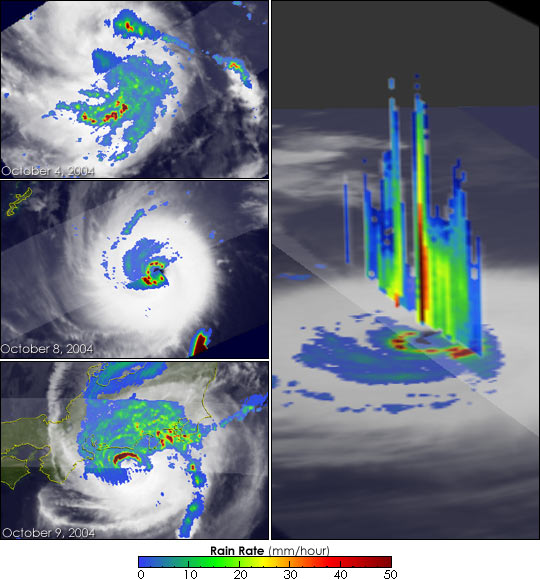
A series of satellite images from the Tropical Rainfall Measuring Mission satellite depicting the structural evolution of Typhoon Ma-on from October 3–9.

As Typhoon Ma-on began turning to the north on October 8 towards Japan, the JMA warned residents in the Tōkai, Kansai, and Shikoku regions of heavy rain. Meteorologists warned it would likely become the strongest storm to strike the Kantō region in at least a decade. Japan Airlines and All Nippon Airways cancelled 262 flights collectively on October 9, affecting 53,000 passengers. Overall, 380 domestic and 72 international flights were cancelled because of Ma-on. The Central Japan Railway Company temporarily suspended service for the entire Tōkaidō Shinkansen line, which travels from Tokyo to Shin-Ōsaka. Mandatory evacuation orders were issued for 3,528 families across five prefectures, while a further 1,600 families voluntarily evacuated from 13 others. Voluntary evacuations also took place on Minamidaitōjima. Practice and qualifying runs for the 2004 Japanese Grand Prix at the Suzuka Circuit, initially scheduled for October 9, were suspended until the following day. Play at the Japan Open was suspended briefly because of the rain from the storm.

Typhoon Ma-on was the eighth of a record-breaking ten landfalling typhoons in Japan during the 2004 season. Of these storms, Ma-on was the only system to strike eastern areas of the nation directly and the second-strongest, with a landfall pressure of 950 mb (hPa; 28.06 inHg). Collectively, these storms resulted in 214 fatalities and over 2,000 injuries. Widespread and extensive damage to housing and infrastructure occurred with well over 200,000 homes damaged or destroyed and financial losses in excess of ¥564 billion (US$5 billion).

The typhoon produced record-breaking wind across the Izu Peninsula when it made landfall on October 9. The most intense winds of more than 215 km/h (134 mph) were confined to areas along Sagami Bay, about 40 km (25 mi) southeast of Tokyo. Contrary to most tropical cyclones, which see their strongest winds in the right-front quadrant, these winds occurred along the backside of Typhoon Ma-on. As the storm passed through, a low level jet formed along the east edge of the Kanto Mountains and facilitated an extreme gap flow event. A peak gust of 243 km/h (151 mph) was measured in Irōzaki; sustained values reached 142 km/h (88 mph) in Ajiro. Record high gusts were observed in Irōzaki, Ajiro, and Ojima, while record high sustained winds occurred in Ajiro, Haneda, and Ojima. The extreme gap flow event resulted from the warm air associated with Ma-on moving over the relatively cool air over the Kanto Plain. As the backside of the storm moved through, northerly winds pushed the cooler air south and allowed it to extend to higher altitudes as it paralleled the mountains along the west side of the plains. Model simulations of the event indicated that without the mountains, winds would have been no more than 126 km/h (78 mph) in the same areas.

Torrential rains accompanied the storm, with several areas reporting rainfall rates in excess of 60 mm (2.4 in) per hour. A local record of 89 mm (3.5 in) per hour was measured in Omaezaki, Shizuoka, which contributed to a 24-hour record of 360 mm (14 in) at the same station. Storm total values peaked in Omaezaki at 413 mm (16.3 in) over a three-day period; measurements in excess of 300 mm (12 in) were confined to Aichi, Chiba, Kanagawa, Shizuoka, and Yamanashi prefectures. Enhanced precipitation affected areas well to the west of Ma-on, such as in Okinawa Prefecture where up to 190 mm (7.5 in) fell in Motobu.

Landslides triggered by the heavy rains caused widespread disruptions in the nation as well as one fatality in Kamakura, Kanagawa. Chiba and Kanagawa Prefectures were particularly hard-hit. Nearly 500 collective landslides affected the prefectures, damaging homes and paralyzing traffic. Part of National Route 19 was blocked and two buildings were damaged by a slide in Nagano Prefecture. A landslide in Niisato, Iwate, blocked portions of a road and prompted voluntary evacuations. Two landslides and flooding caused a few road closures in Miyagi Prefecture. Slides occurred as far west as Nara and Okinawa. One shut down a 2 km (1.2 mi) stretch of road in Hokkejicho while three occurred in Nago.

Approximately 180,000 Tokyo Electric customers lost power during the storm. In Minamiizu, Shizuoka, a power pole struck a man downed by high winds and later died at the hospital. Extensive agricultural and infrastructural damage occurred in Fukushima Prefecture, where losses amounted to ¥3.4 billion Agricultural losses in Chiba amounted to ¥1.2 billion.

Widespread disruptions to rail service in eastern Japan resulted from the typhoon. Service along the Tokyo Metro Namboku Line subway suspended due to flooding at the Azabu-Jūban Station. Flooding and heavy rains prompted suspensions of the Saikyō, Keiyō, Tōhoku Shinkansen, Jōetsu Shinkansen, Nagano Shinkansen, and Keihin-Tōhoku lines. Trains along the Tokyo Monorail and express lines from the Odakyu Electric Railway and Keikyu were also interrupted. Additionally, a landslide struck a portion of the Chūō Main Line. A train derailed in Yamanashi Prefecture due to debris on the track.

In Gunma Prefecture a man was injured after being blown off his roof in Ōta while trying to repair a gutter. A few homes were flooded and damage in the prefecture amounted to ¥41.2 million. One person sustained minor injuries in Tokorozawa. Flooding in Saitama Prefecture affected 1,562 homes, 159 severely, and hundreds of roads were left impassible. In Iwatsuki, the Ayase River overflowed its banks and prompted the evacuation of 74 people. Damage to agriculture and forestry amounted to ¥253.5 million. Six people were injured, one seriously, in Ibaraki Prefecture, by high winds. Numerous landslides occurred, some of which blocked rivers and caused flooding; others blocked rail lines. A total of 191 homes were affected by floods, 53 of which sustained damage. In terms of agriculture, 4,606 ha (11,380 acres) of crops flooded and losses reached ¥866 million.

A car carrying four people was swept away by a landslide in Fujikawa; however, the occupants were unharmed. Landslides and flooding caused numerous disruptions to transportation. Damage amounted to ¥1.5 billion in Yamanashi Prefecture. Landslides and flooding caused extensive damage in Aichi Prefecture. Damage to agriculture and forestry amounted to ¥391 million. Two people were killed and eighteen others were injured in Chiba Prefecture. Roughly 1,100 homes were affected by flooding, some of which sustained damage. Evacuations orders were issued for 1,703 households across 14 municipalities. Property and infrastructure sustained extensive damage in Shizuoka Prefecture. A total of 165 homes collapsed while 244 more were partially destroyed. Four people were killed and one hundred others were injured. Water and power utilities were severely affected, with losses exceeding ¥1 billion collectively. In Tokyo Prefecture, on the island of Kōzu-shima, 48 homes were evacuated during the storm. Flooding affected over 1,000 homes in Tokyo former, with 24 structures being destroyed. In Kanagawa Prefecture, a landslide killed one person in Kamakura while 43 others were injured throughout the prefecture. Nearly 200 landslides across the prefecture shut down large stretches of highway and rail lines, paralyzing public transportation. More than 2,400 homes were affected by flooding, though only three were destroyed.

Additional, though minor, damage occurred in Akita, Aomori, Gifu, Mie, Niigata, Shimane, Tochigi, Wakayama, and Yamagata prefectures. According to the Fire and Disaster Management Agency (FDMA), 135 homes were destroyed while 4,796 sustained damage. Another report from Rika Nenpyo indicated far greater damage: 5,553 homes destroyed and 7,843 others damaged. Relative to the intensity of the storm, however, casualties were low with seven-nine fatalities and 169 injuries. Total damage from the storm amounted to ¥68.6 billion (US$603 million). Insurance payouts amounted to ¥27.2 billion (US$241 million) in the wake of the storm.

=== Alaska ===
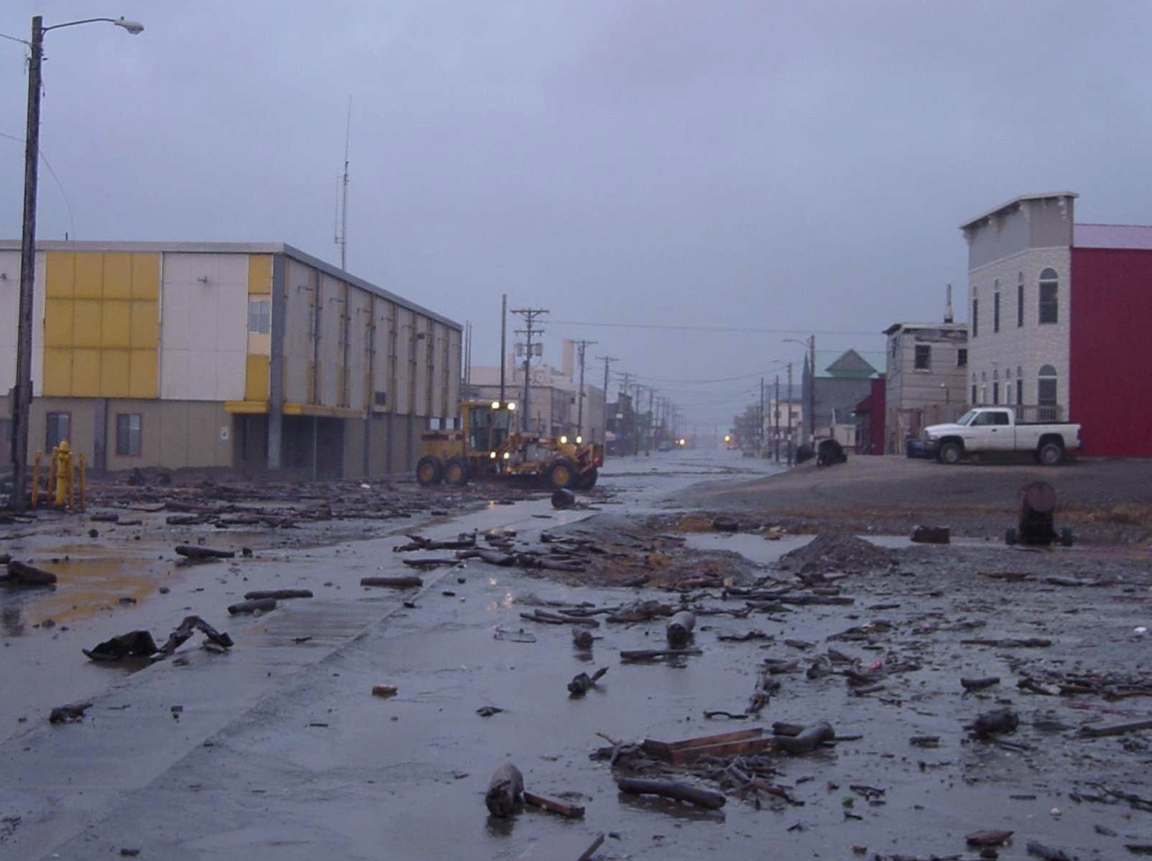
Damage from the storm along Front Street in Nome

The powerful extratropical remnants of Ma-on resulted in extensive damage along the west coast of Alaska in mid-October. Winds of 80 to 129 km/h (50 to 80 mph) battered many towns and fueled a damaging storm surge. At the Red Dog mine, a measurement of a 183 km/h (114 mph) gust was noted by the observer; however, this value was pegged as questionable and the highest verified gust was 124 km/h (77 mph). Other notable measurements include 114 km/h (71 mph) at Tin City, 110 km/h (70 mph) in Skookum Pass and Savoonga, 97 km/h (60 mph) in Golovin, and 95 km/h (59 mph) in Nome. The greatest storm surge occurred in areas without measuring capabilities, though a peak of 3.0 to 3.7 m (10 to 12 ft) was estimated in Shishmaref and 2.4 to 3.0 m (8 to 10 ft) in Kivalina. Nome itself was affected by a 3.19 m (10.45 ft) surge while Diomede and Teller had estimated values of 1.8 to 2.4 m (6 to 8 ft). Record high water rises occurred at Nome and Red Dog Dock, peaking at 4.12 and 3.2 m (13.5 and 10.5 ft) respectively. The value in Nome exceeded the previous record of 3.7 m (12 ft) in October 1992; however, the measurement at Red Dog Dock was surpassed just over two months later. Little precipitation accompanied the system, with only Coldfoot reporting snow accumulations of 18 cm (7 in).

Nome suffered the brunt of damage from the cyclone, with most structures along the coast sustaining damage. Forty-five residents had to be evacuated at the height of the storm. Front Street flooded entirely and resembled a "war zone" according to residents. Most buildings in the area had their windows blown out from high winds except for those boarded with plywood. Some businesses had up to 0.91 m (3 ft) of water in their basement. Valves on three 450 kg (1,000 lb) propane tanks broke off during the storm at businesses on Front Street, prompting police to evacuate the area and the adjacent streets. Power was cut as a precautionary measure because of flammable gas. Strong winds in Wales caused a 300-gallon fuel spill when a metal support at the village clinic toppled, rupturing the fuel line. Large waves caused havoc across the Seward Peninsula. Erosion in Elim destroyed a local road and exposed the city's septic tanks and main water line. Shishmaref experienced some loss of sand, though recently constructed ripraps spared the area from significant damage. Most affected areas had damage to power poles, with only coastal regions sustaining structural impacts. Losses throughout the state was conservatively estimated at $20 million.

In the aftermath of the storm, on November 16, President George W. Bush signed a disaster declaration for the Bering Strait Regional Education Attendance Area and the Northwest Arctic Borough. Funding from the Federal Emergency Management Agency was made available to residents in these areas as well as the city of Mekoryuk. Public assistance teams were deployed to Nome and Unalakleet on November 19 to establish a base of operations for relief and assess the impact of the storm. Visits to smaller communities throughout the affected region were planned as well. At the end of November, the disaster declaration expanded to include Chevak, the Pribilof Islands Regional Education Attendance Areas, and communities along the Lower Kuskokwim and Lower Yukon rivers.

== See also ==
- Other tropical cyclones named Ma-on
- Other tropical cyclones named Rolly
- Tropical cyclones in 2004
- Other typhoons that struck Japan during the 2004 season:
  - Typhoon Nida
  - Typhoon Conson
  - Typhoon Dianmu
  - Typhoon Chaba
  - Typhoon Songda
  - Typhoon Meari
  - Typhoon Tokage
- 2011 Bering Sea superstorm
- Typhoon Wipha (2013) – a typhoon which hit the same areas as Ma-on
- Typhoon Phanfone (2014) – another typhoon which affected the Japanese Grand Prix
- Typhoon Hagibis (2019) – a powerful typhoon which also struck eastern Japan, disrupting both the Japanese Grand Prix and the Rugby World Cup fifteen years later
