= List of storms named Quenton =

The name Quenton has been used for two tropical cyclones in the Australian region of the Southern Hemisphere:

- Cyclone Quenton (1983) – first cyclone to make landfall in Australia since 1973.
- Cyclone Quenton (1994) – stayed out at sea throughout its life.
