= Tropical Storm Wukong (2012) =

Tropical storm in the 2012 Pacific typhoon season

Tropical Storm Wukong (Quinta)
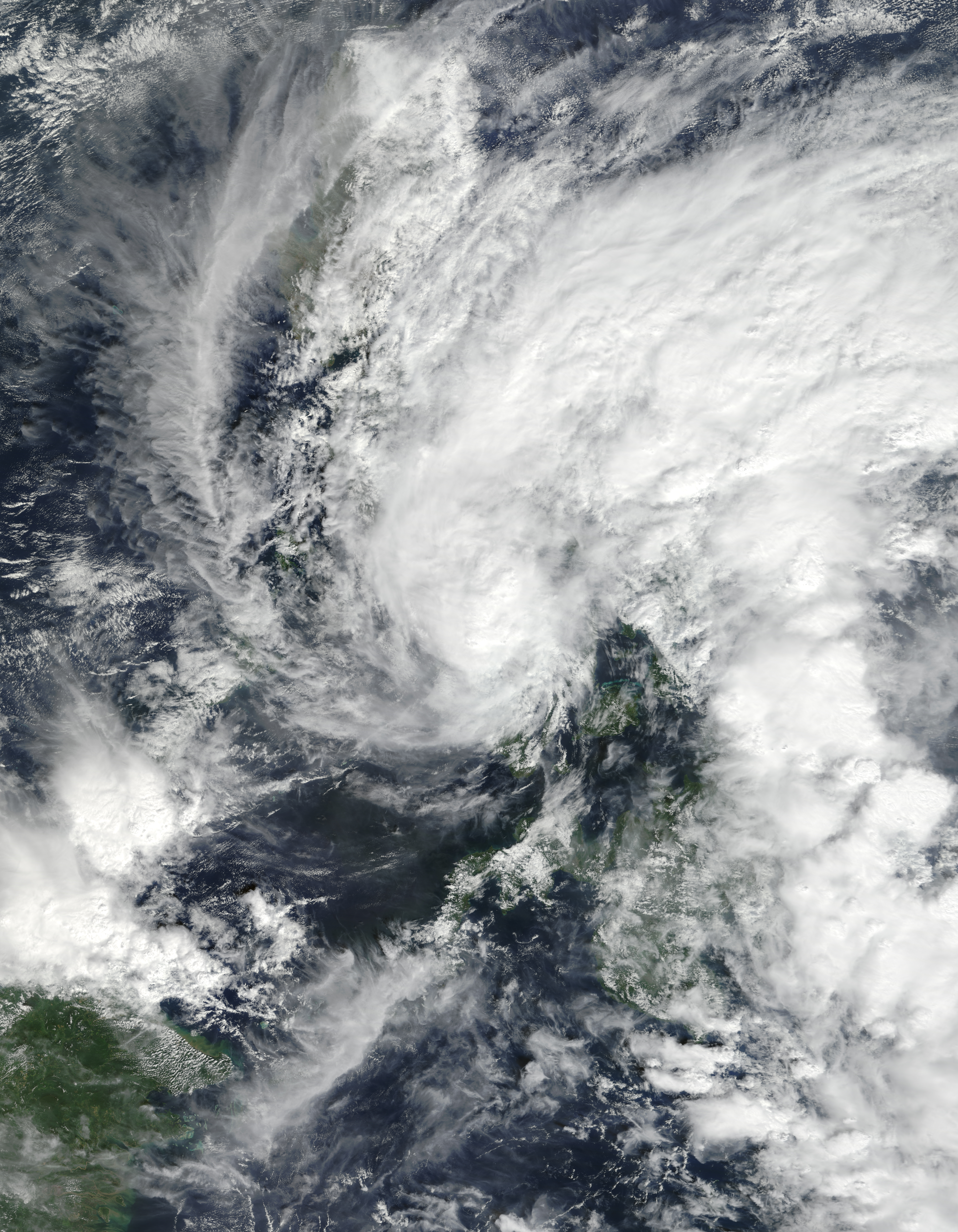
- Tropical Storm Wukong over the Philippines on December 26

Meteorological history
- Formed: December 24, 2012
- Dissipated: December 29, 2012

Tropical storm
- 10-minute sustained (JMA)
- Highest winds: 75 km/h (45 mph)
- Lowest pressure: 1000 hPa (mbar); 29.53 inHg

Tropical storm
- 1-minute sustained (SSHWS/JTWC)
- Highest winds: 65 km/h (40 mph)
- Lowest pressure: 996 hPa (mbar); 29.41 inHg

Overall effects
- Casualties: 23 dead, 4 missing
- Damage: $16.9 million (2012 USD)
- Areas affected: Philippines, Vietnam
- IBTrACS /
- Part of the 2012 Pacific typhoon season

Tropical Storm Wukong, know in the Philippines as Tropical Storm Quinta, was a weak but deadly tropical cyclone which struck the Philippines in late-December 2012. The twenty-fifth named storm of the 2012 Pacific typhoon season, the origin of Wukong can be traced back to December 20, as an area on convection southwest of Pohnpei. The system showed little signs of development in the coming days. Until December 24 the system was classified as a tropical depression, and it strengthened to Tropical Storm Wukong on the next day as it tracked west-northwest. Wukong made multiple landfalls over the central Philippines on December 26, and emerged into the South China Sea on the next day. Wukong weakened to a tropical depression as it tracked west-southwestward on December 28 and dissipated on the next day while located just south of the Cà Mau Peninsula.

Striking the Philippines just three weeks after powerful Typhoon Bopha causing catastrophic damage and massive deaths. The government stayed alert and people located in the vulnerable areas were evacuated. Nonetheless, Wuukong still brought heavy rainfalls, triggered flooding and landslides which caused 23 deaths and 4 missing across the country. Damage countrywide amounted to Php695 million (US$16.9 million). Afterwards, Aklan, Iloilo and Capiz were placed under the state of calamity.

== Meteorological history ==
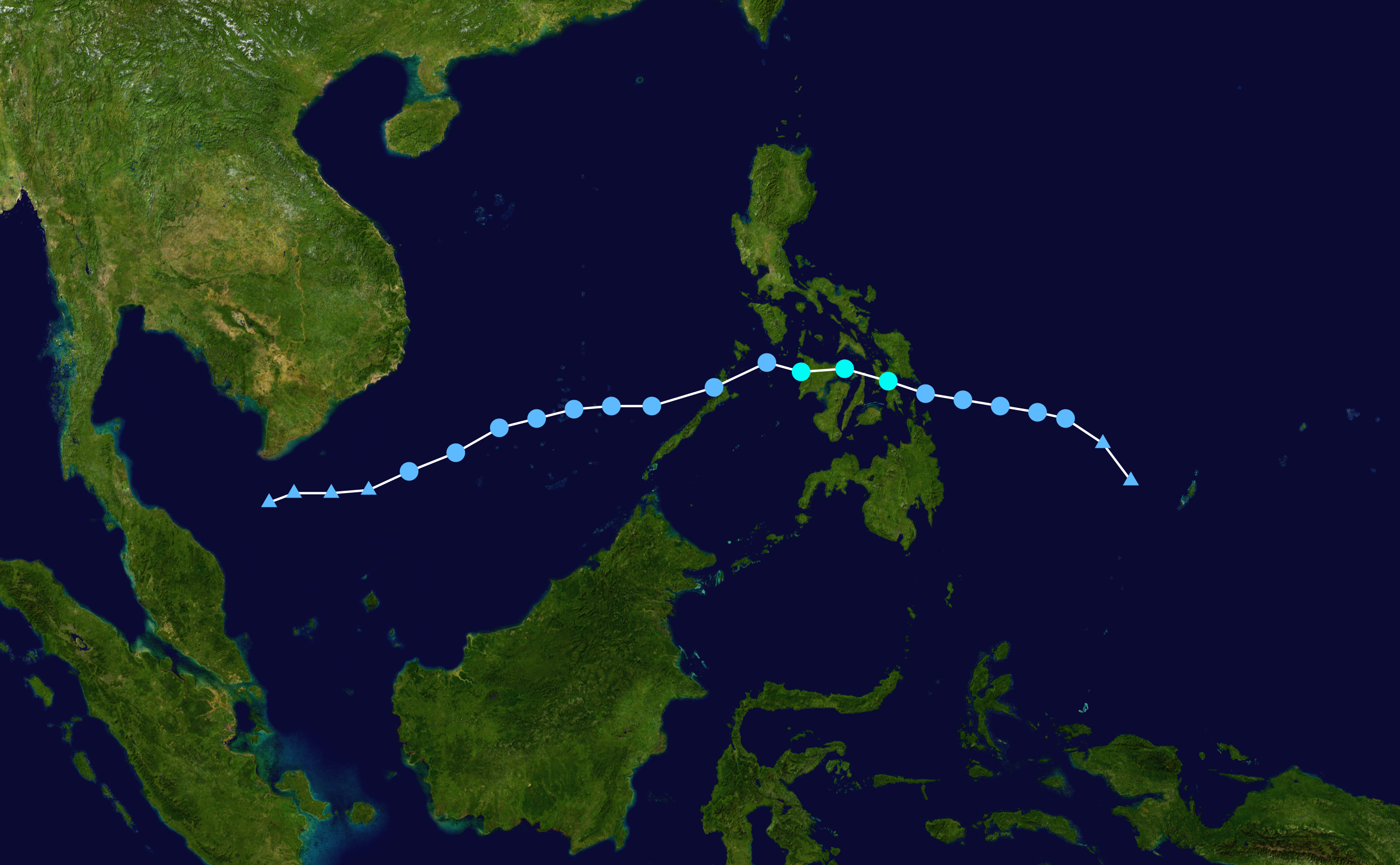
Map plotting the storm's track and intensity, according to the Saffir–Simpson scale Map key Saffir–Simpson scale Tropical depression (≤38 mph, ≤62 km/h) Tropical storm (39–73 mph, 63–118 km/h) Category 1 (74–95 mph, 119–153 km/h) Category 2 (96–110 mph, 154–177 km/h) Category 3 (111–129 mph, 178–208 km/h) Category 4 (130–156 mph, 209–251 km/h) Category 5 (≥157 mph, ≥252 km/h) Unknown Storm type Tropical cyclone Subtropical cyclone Extratropical cyclone, remnant low, tropical disturbance, or monsoon depression

On December 20, the Joint Typhoon Warning Center (JTWC) began monitoring an area of convection located roughly 160 mi (260 km) southwest of Pohnpei, associated with a weak low-level circulation center (LLCC). Located at a marginal environment with an area of diffluence and easterly flow, but offset by moderate wind shear, the JTWC assessed that the system had a low chance for tropical cyclogenesis. The system showed little signs of development for days, and the JTWC ceased monitoring on December 22. However, the Japan Meteorological Agency (JMA) classified the system as a tropical depression early on December 24, about 140 mi (220 km) west of Palau. The JTWC monitor the system again on the same day. Deep convection was displaced by wind shear, and the LLCC was exposed and remained ill-defined. Several hours later, the JTWC issued a Tropical Cyclone Formation Alert, and designated it as a tropical depression at 21:00 UTC. At the same time, the Philippine Atmospheric, Geophysical and Astronomical Services Administration (PAGASA) began monitored the system and assigned the local name Quinta. The system tracked west-northwest along the southern edge of the subtropical ridge. Affected by moderate wind shear, the depression could only strengthened slowly. Nonetheless, the JMA upgraded it to a tropical storm and assigned the name Wukong at 00:00 UTC December 25. (Note: The name Wukong (Mandarin: 悟空, [u˥˩ kʰʊŋ˥]) was contributed by China and refers to Sun Wukong, a character in the Chinese epic Journey to the West in Mandarin.) Wukong attained peak intensity six hours later, with peak winds of 45 mph (75 km/h).

Between 7 and 8 p.m. PST (11:00–12:00 UTC) December 25, Wukong made landfall in Homonhon Island. At 12 a.m. PST December 26 (16:00 UTC) December 25, Wukong made another landfall in Abuyog, Leyte, then made landfalls in Poro Island at 19:00 UTC December 25 (3 a.m. PST December 26), in Pacijan Island at 20:00 UTC December 25 (4 a.m. PST December 26), and in Catmon, Cebu at 22:00 UTC December 25 (6 a.m. PST December 26). Despite making landfall, Wukong's organization improved as convection wrapped tightly into the LLCC and the center become well-definied, which prompted the JTWC to upgrade the system to a tropical storm at 21:00 UTC. Wukong made the sixth landfall in northern Iloilo early on December 26, and made the final landfall in Coron, Palawan later that day. Wukong weakened slightly and emerged into the South China Sea early on December 27. Deep convection re-developed at the northern part of the storm, and the JMA maintained Wukong's tropical storm status throughout the day. Wukong turned west-southwest as steered by the northeast monsoon. The monsoon brought stronger wind shear and caused the LLCC of Wukong exposed. Wukong weakened to a tropical depression at 06:00 UTC December 28, and the JTWC issued the final warning to the system a few hours later. Wukong continued to track west-southwest, and dissipated a day later, at about 103 mi (165 km) south of the southern tip of Cà Mau Peninsula.

== Preparations, impact and aftermath ==
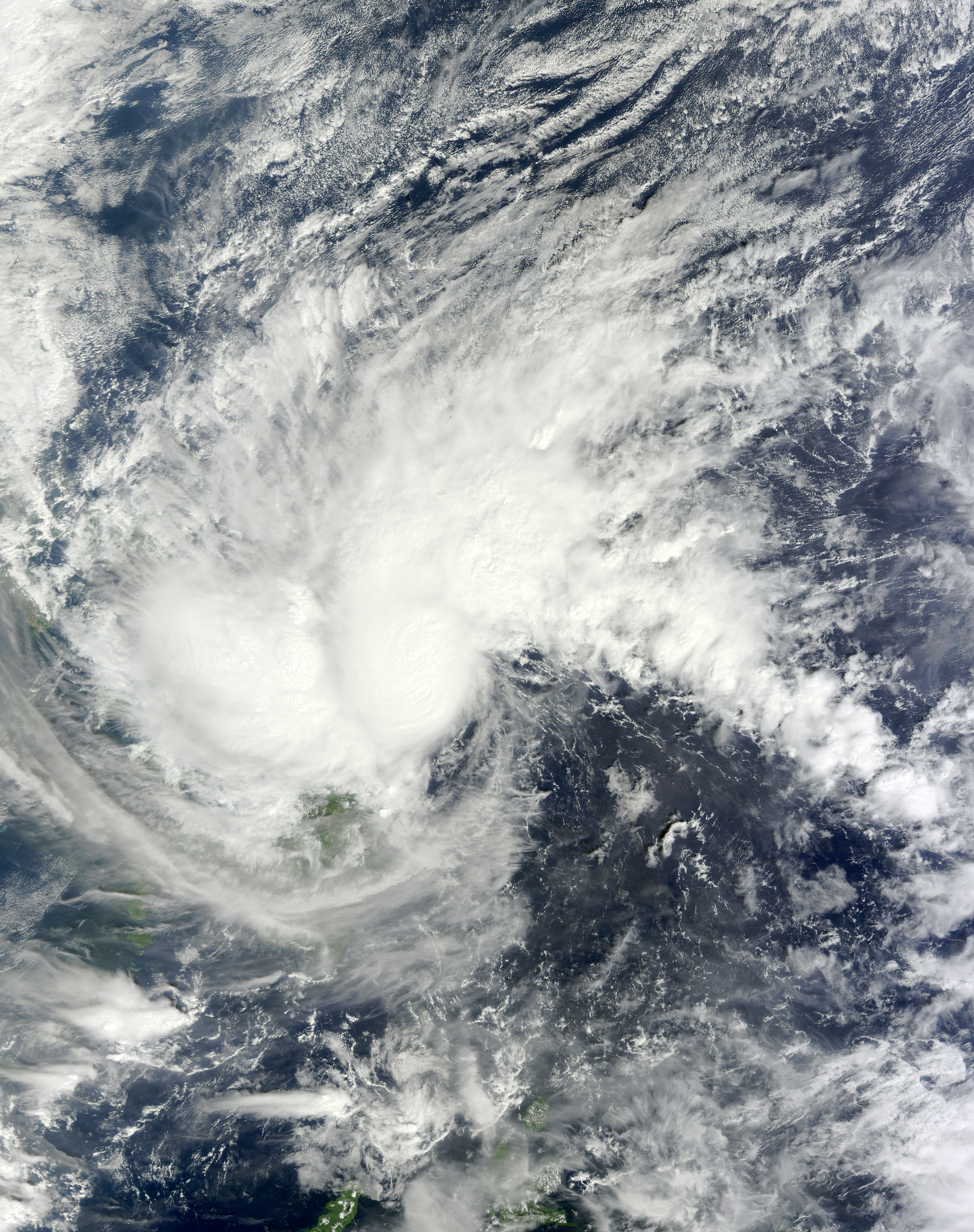
Tropical Storm Wukong approaching the Philippines on December 25

Shortly after being designated as tropical depression, the PAGASA issued the PSWS #1 for provinces in Leyte, Samar, Caraga, and Camiguin. As Wukong strengthened to a tropical storm, the PAGASA issued the PSWS #2 for provinces in Eastern Visayas, Central Visayas, and Caraga, while the PSWS #1 was issued for provinces in Negros Island Region, Western Visayas, Bicol Region, and the Misamis Oriental on December 25. The PSWS #1 was raised to #2 to the provinces in Negros Island Region, Western Visayas, Bicol Region as Wukong continued to approach the country. The PAGASA cancelled the PSWS #2 early on December 26 as Wukong weakened to a tropical depression. (Note: This was based on the real-time analysis of the PAGASA. At that time, the JMA still maintained Wukong as a tropical storm.) Early on December 27, all the PSWS were cancelled as Wukong weakened further to a low-pressure area.

As Wukong approached, many ports in Visayas and Mindanao were closed. Domestic flights of Cebu Pacific, Zest Air and Air Philippines were cancelled. Across the country, nearly 6,000 people were stranded due to cancellation of flights and ship vessels. 2,550 people were stranded in Manila. In Masbate, 32 people were stranded in Masbate City as the ports were closed, and another 18 were stranded in the Burias Island. 572 people were stranded in Maasin and Catbalogan due to disruption of public transport. Sea vessels were suspended on December 26, 1,654 people were stranded in Iloilo while 48 people were stranded in Malay, Aklan.

In advance of the storm, people in Iloilo and Leyte were evacuated. Wukong brought heavy rainfalls and caused flooding in central Philippines. A landslide was reported from Sogod, Southern Leyte. Another landslide occurred in General MacArthur, Eastern Samar. In Samar, six people were killed by the storm: Three were hit by downed trees and the other three were washed away by floodwaters. Many place in Leyte and Samar were flooded. In Cebu, damage to crops and infrastructure were rather minimal, though power outages occurred in the northern part of the province. In Negros Occidental, four houses were destroyed and 27 others were damaged. 15 town in Iloilo were affected by flooding. 1,360 families were evacuated to safety places. Part of a national highway in Passi, Iloilo was blocked by flooding. Two people were dead and two others were missing across the province. Two villages in Kalibo, Aklan were completely submerged. The severity of the flooding was similar to Ketsana which devastated the country three years ago. Damage in Aklan stood at Php15.3 million (US$372 thousand). According to the National Disaster Risk Reduction and Management Council (NDRRMC), 377,293 people were affected by the storm. 23 people were killed, most of the fatalities occurred in the Western Visayas. The storm also caused 3 injury and left 4 others missing. 6,453 houses were damaged, in which 1,931 were destroyed. Damage across the Philippines reached Php695 million (US$16.9 million). The Government distributed Php9.46 million (US$230 thousand) to those who were affected by the storm.

On December 28, Aklan was placed under the state of calamity, stated that more than 20 towns in the province were affected by flooding. The next day, the government of Iloilo and Capiz also declared the state of calamity, as massive loss of life and property were reported.

== See also ==
- Other tropical cyclones named Wukong
- Other tropical cyclones named Quinta
- Typhoon Utor (2006)
- Tropical Storm Washi
- Tropical Storm Jangmi (2014)
- Typhoon Tembin
- Typhoon Phanfone
- Tropical Storm Krovanh (2020)
