= Typhoon Tokage =

Pacific typhoon in 2004

Typhoon Tokage (Siony)
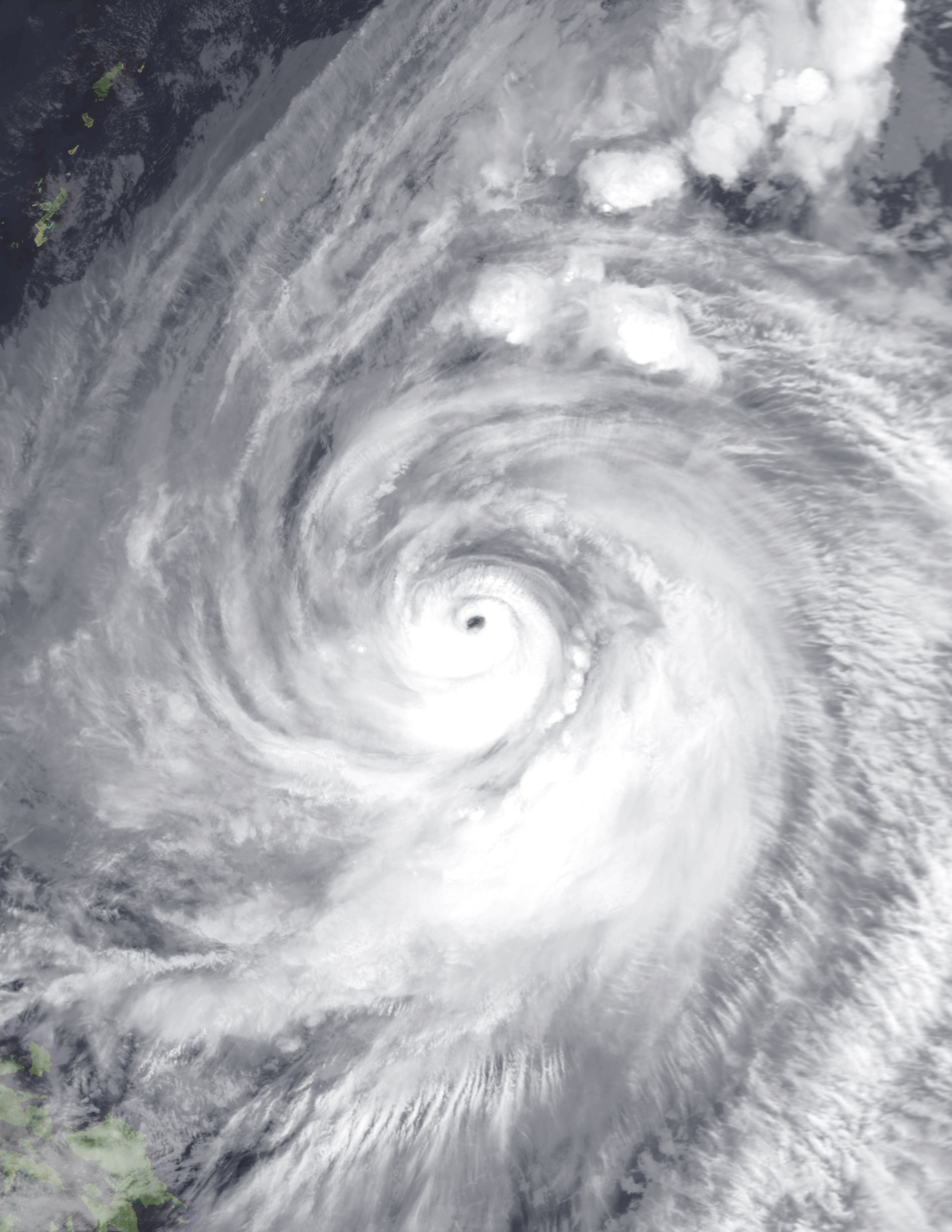
- Typhoon Tokage near peak intensity on October 16

Meteorological history
- Formed: October 12, 2004
- Extratropical: October 20, 2004
- Dissipated: October 23, 2004

Very strong typhoon
- 10-minute sustained (JMA)
- Highest winds: 155 km/h (100 mph)
- Lowest pressure: 940 hPa (mbar); 27.76 inHg

Category 4-equivalent typhoon
- 1-minute sustained (SSHWS/JTWC)
- Highest winds: 230 km/h (145 mph)
- Lowest pressure: 916 hPa (mbar); 27.05 inHg

Overall effects
- Fatalities: 95
- Missing: 3
- Damage: $7.11 billion (2004 USD)
- Areas affected: Northern Mariana Islands, Ryukyu Islands, Taiwan, Japan
- IBTrACS
- Part of the 2004 Pacific typhoon season

Typhoon Tokage, (Note: The name Tokage (Japanese: トカゲ, [to̞ka̠ɡe̞]) was contributed by Japan and refers to the constellation Lacerta, the lizard, in Japanese.) known in the Philippines as Typhoon Siony, was the deadliest typhoon to strike Japan since Typhoon Bess in 1982. The twenty-third storm to be named using an international list of names during the 2004 Pacific typhoon season, Tokage was the last of three typhoons to impact Japan from late-September to mid-October 2004. Typhoon Tokage began as a tropical depression near the Northern Mariana Islands on October 10. With very warm waters, the system started to undergo a rapid deepening phase early on October 13 and reached its peak strength on the 17th. Tokage made landfall over Japan on October 20, just before becoming extratropical.

Tokage was the 10th storm to strike Japan in 2004, making 2004 the largest year ever for the number of storms made landfall in Japan. The record until 2003 was 6 (1990 and 1993), but 2004 was 10.

== Meteorological history ==
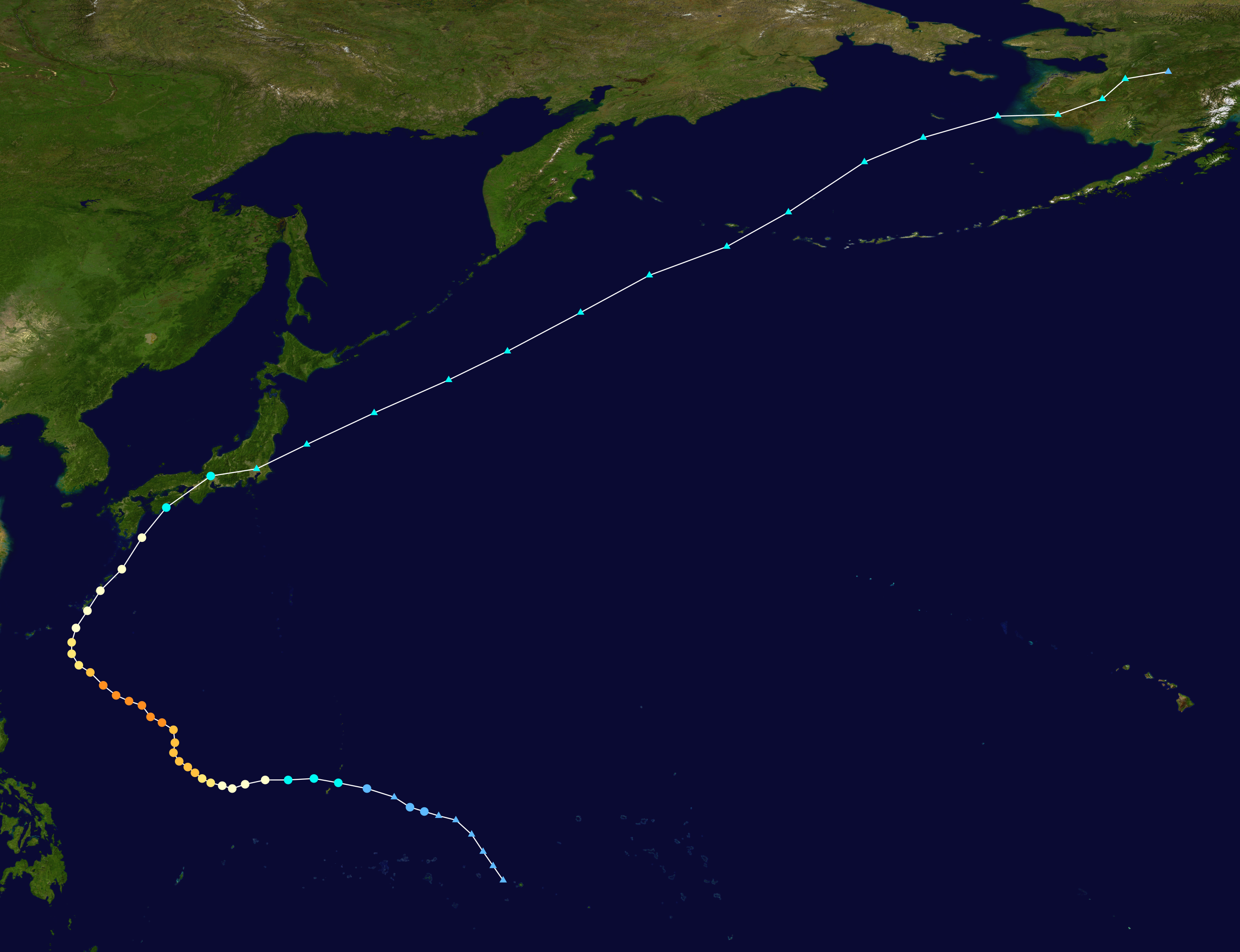
Map plotting the storm's track and intensity, according to the Saffir–Simpson scale Map key Saffir–Simpson scale Tropical depression (≤38 mph, ≤62 km/h) Tropical storm (39–73 mph, 63–118 km/h) Category 1 (74–95 mph, 119–153 km/h) Category 2 (96–110 mph, 154–177 km/h) Category 3 (111–129 mph, 178–208 km/h) Category 4 (130–156 mph, 209–251 km/h) Category 5 (≥157 mph, ≥252 km/h) Unknown Storm type Tropical cyclone Subtropical cyclone Extratropical cyclone, remnant low, tropical disturbance, or monsoon depression

From Typhoon Meari and Ma-on, the Intertropical Convergence Zone became active on September 28. A large area of convection persisted on October 10. On October 12, the area of convection separated into two systems, with the other one becoming Typhoon Nock-ten, which existed 480 miles east-southeast of Guam within the ITCZ. The system developed into Tropical Depression 27W at late that day, moving in a west-northwesterly at 15 kn about 200 miles east of Guam. On the October 13, the system developed into a tropical storm, and was named Tokage, subsequently moving very close to the islands of Rota and Guam. Typhoon intensity was achieved early on October 14 when centered 970 miles southeast of Okinawa. Later that day, Tokage briefly turned to the west-southwest. The storm's path curved back to a northwesterly heading by the October 15. The storm curled towards the north as a major shortwave over weakened the subtropical ridge and by October 17 Tokage reached its peak intensity of 125 kn/145 mph. Weakening began later that day as the storm turned back to a more northwesterly heading towards Okinawa and Japan. On October 18, Typhoon Tokage was 290 miles south of Kadena Air Base, Okinawa. Recurvature back to the north-northeast towards Japan ensued while the typhoon slowly weakened. Tokage made its closest approach to Okinawa late on October 19 when it was passed just to the south-southeast. The storm turned to the northeast as continued to accelerate as its extratropical transition began. Tokage made landfall over Tosa-Shimizu, near the southern tip of Shikoku, Japan still at typhoon strength. By October 21, the cyclone weakened into a tropical storm 130 nm west of Tokyo, and later that day, the system completed the transition to a nontropical low. The extratropical remains of Tokage moved rapidly northeastward, crossing the International Dateline around midday on October 23.

== Impact and aftermath ==
Costliest known Pacific typhoons (adjusted for inflation)
| Rank | Typhoon | Season | Damage (2025 USD) |
|---|---|---|---|
| 1 | 4 Doksuri | 2023 | $30.1 billion |
| 2 | 4 Mireille | 1991 | $23.6 billion |
| 3 | 5 Hagibis | 2019 | $21.8 billion |
| 4 | 5 Saomai | 2000 | $17.3 billion |
| 5 | 5 Jebi | 2018 | $16.7 billion |
| 6 | 4 Songda | 2004 | $15.9 billion |
| 7 | 5 Yagi | 2024 | $15.1 billion |
| 8 | 2 Fitow | 2013 | $14.4 billion |
| 9 | 4 Faxai | 2019 | $12.6 billion |
| 10 | 4 Tokage | 2004 | $12.1 billion |

=== Japan ===
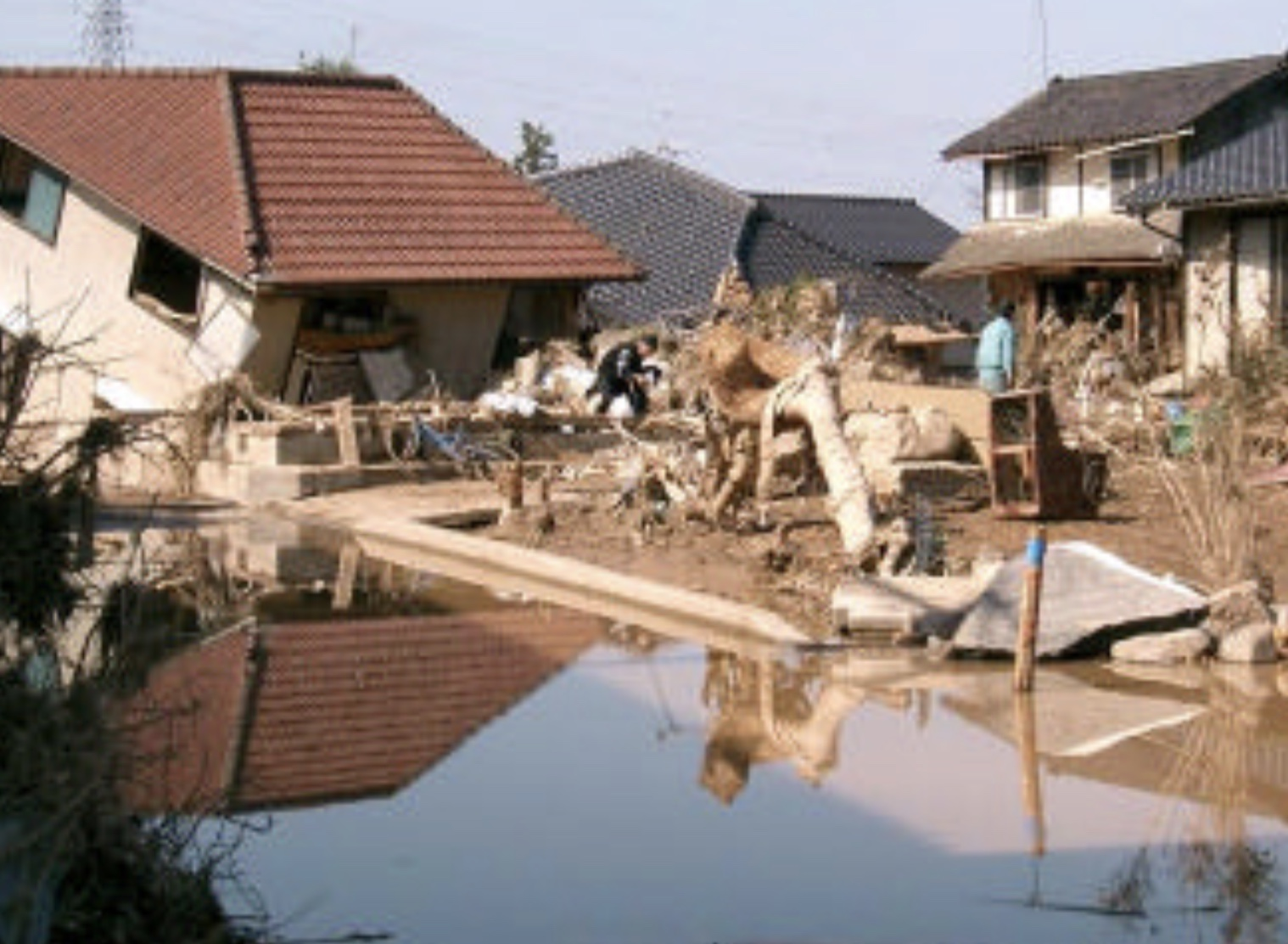
flood damage by Tokage

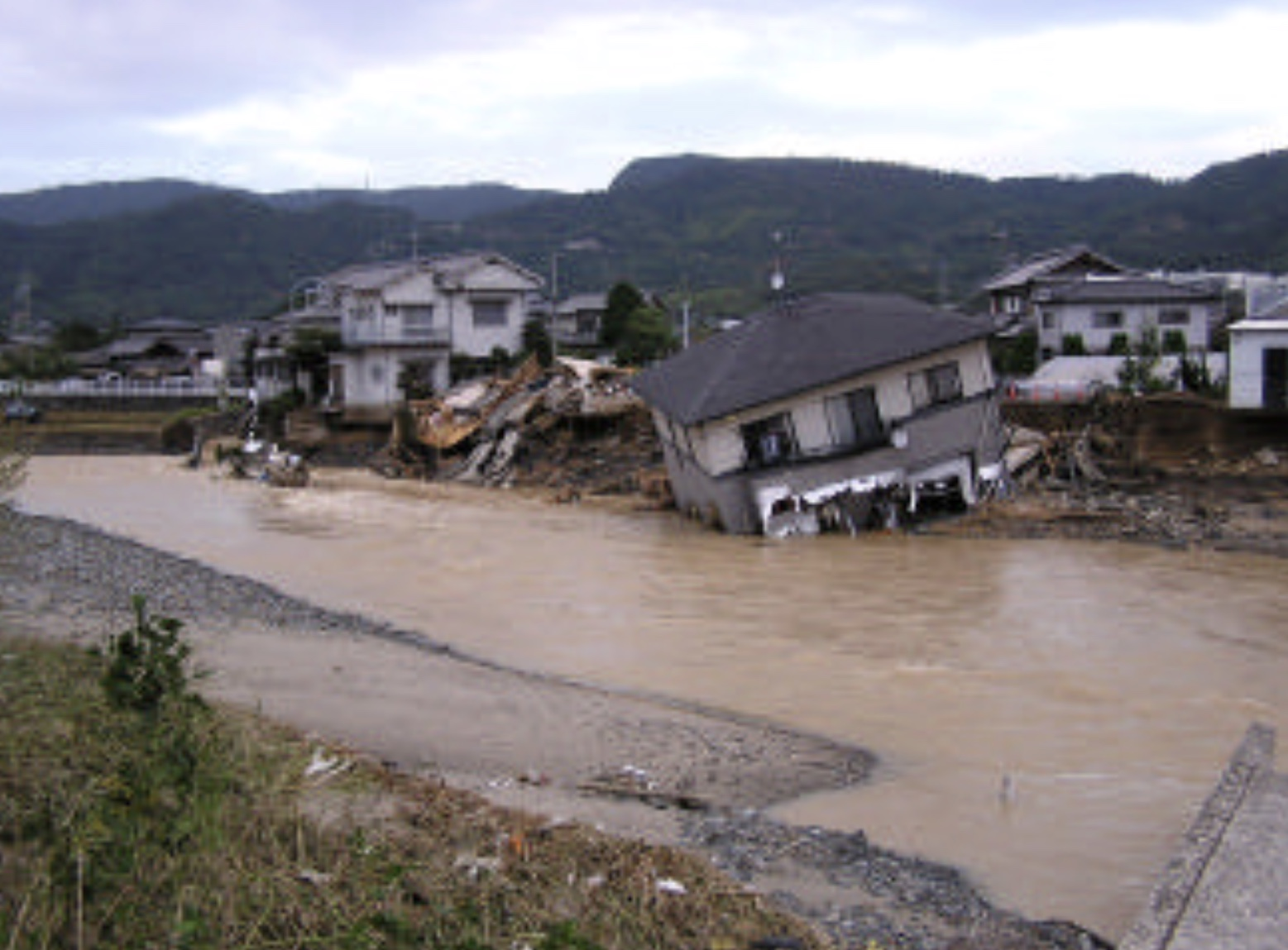

Tokage came ashore over southern or southeastern Japan on 01:35 (UTC) of October 20. The highest measured wind gust was 142 mph/63.7 m/s at Unzendake, Nagasaki on October 20. The lowest pressure from a land station was 949.4 mb at Okinoerabu, Kagoshima late on October 19. The highest rainfall amount noted in Japan was 550 mm at Fukuharaasahi between late on October 17 and October 21, with 470 mm falling within a 24-hour period.

A total of 18,000 people were forced to evacuate their homes. Damages of the typhoon reached JPY771 billion (US$7.11 billion). A total of 95 deaths were attributed to high winds, flooding and mudslides caused by Tokage, with an additional three people reported missing.

== See also ==
- Typhoon Mireille
- Typhoon Meari (2004)
- Tropical Storm Etau (2009)
- Typhoon Wipha (2013)
- Typhoon Neoguri (2014)
- 2018 Japan floods – a catastrophic flood event with similar impacts to Tokage
