= List of storms named Quinta =

The name Quinta has been used for four tropical cyclones in the Philippine Area of Responsibility by PAGASA in the Western Pacific Ocean.

- Typhoon Meari (2004) (T0421, 25W, Quinta) – made landfall on Kyūshū, Japan.
- Tropical Storm Maysak (2008) (T0819, 24W, Quinta-Siony) – affected the Philippines; Quinta was renamed as Siony.
- Tropical Storm Wukong (2012) (T1225, 27W, Quinta) – traversed the Philippines, causing flash flooding.
- Typhoon Molave (2020) (T2018, 21W, Quinta) - a powerful typhoon which devastated the Southern Luzon area of the Philippines and Vietnam.

The name Quinta was retired following the 2020 Pacific typhoon season and was replaced with Querubin, which is a Filipino feminine given name.
