= Typhoon Meari (2004) =

Pacific typhoon in 2004

Typhoon Meari (Quinta)
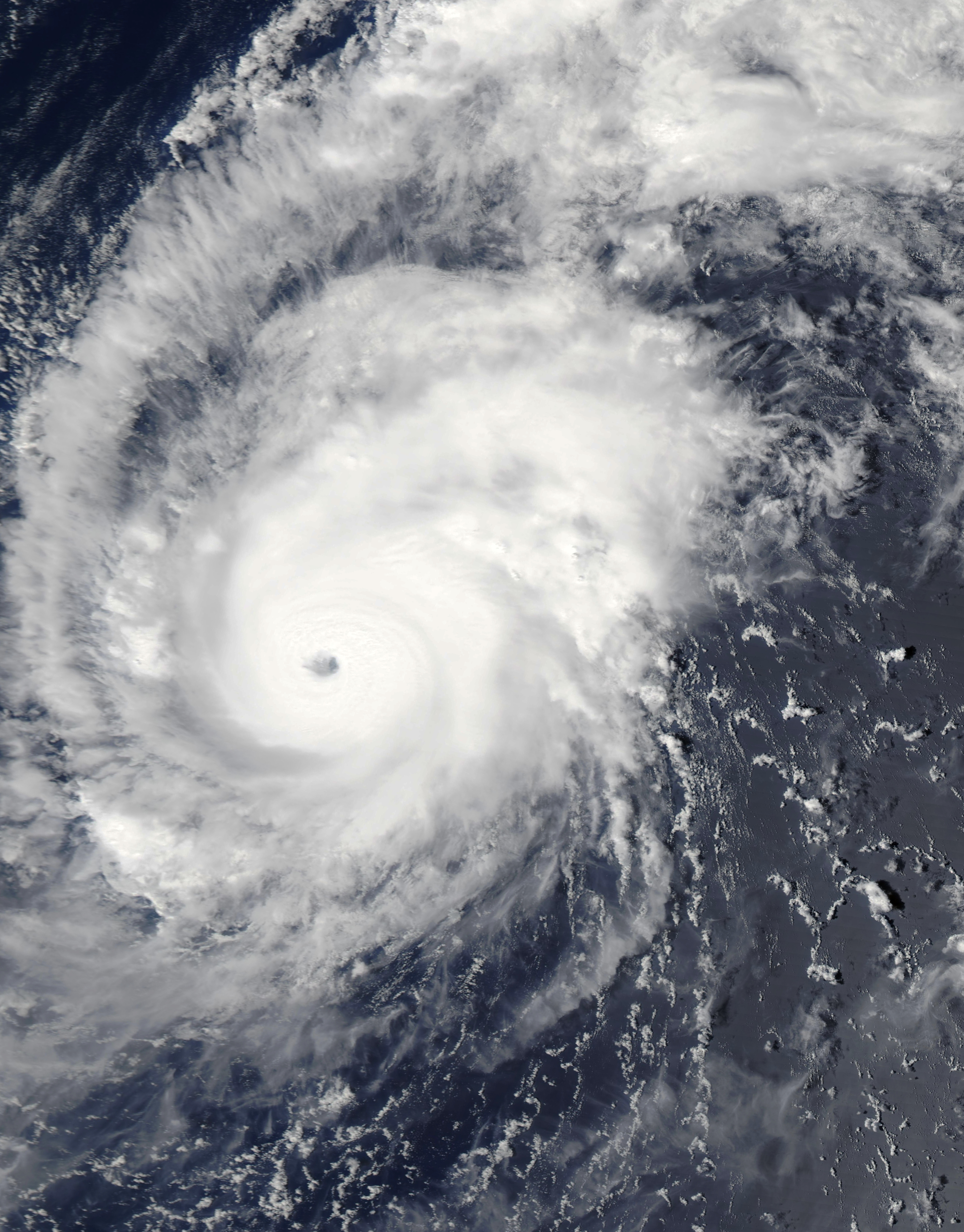
- Typhoon Meari (September 24)

Meteorological history
- Formed: September 19, 2004
- Dissipated: September 29, 2004

Very strong typhoon
- 10-minute sustained (JMA)
- Highest winds: 165 km/h (105 mph)
- Lowest pressure: 940 hPa (mbar); 27.76 inHg

Category 4-equivalent typhoon
- 1-minute sustained (SSHWS/JTWC)
- Highest winds: 230 km/h (145 mph)
- Lowest pressure: 916 hPa (mbar); 27.05 inHg

Overall effects
- Fatalities: 27 total
- Damage: $796 million (2004 USD)
- Areas affected: Caroline Islands, Japan
- IBTrACS
- Part of the 2004 Pacific typhoon season

Typhoon Meari, known in the Philippines as Typhoon Quinta was a typhoon that hit Japan in late September 2004. Meari killed 27 people and caused nearly $800 million in damages.

== Meteorological history ==
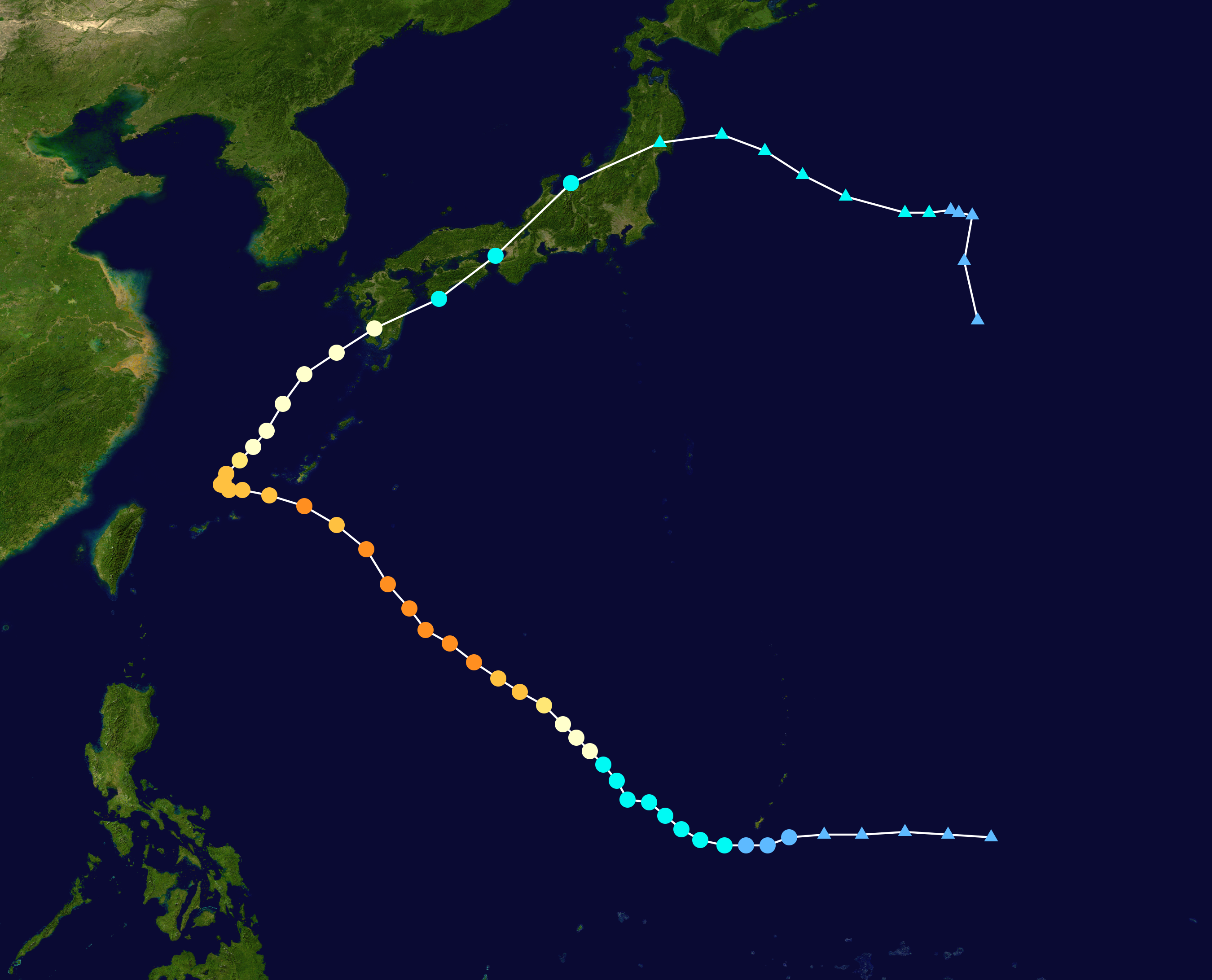
Map plotting the storm's track and intensity, according to the Saffir–Simpson scale Map key Saffir–Simpson scale Tropical depression (≤38 mph, ≤62 km/h) Tropical storm (39–73 mph, 63–118 km/h) Category 1 (74–95 mph, 119–153 km/h) Category 2 (96–110 mph, 154–177 km/h) Category 3 (111–129 mph, 178–208 km/h) Category 4 (130–156 mph, 209–251 km/h) Category 5 (≥157 mph, ≥252 km/h) Unknown Storm type Tropical cyclone Subtropical cyclone Extratropical cyclone, remnant low, tropical disturbance, or monsoon depression

Late on September 18, an area of convection was noted 510 miles east of Guam. On the 20th, Tropical Depression 25W organized out of this mass and was located just 35 miles southeast of Guam. 25W turned more westward and began to accelerate as it moved along the southern periphery of a warm-core ridge. On the 21st, the system was upgraded to a tropical storm named Meari. (Note: The name Meari (Korean: 메아리, [me̞a̠ɾi]) was contributed by North Korea and means echo in Korean.) It intensified steadily while moving more northwestward. The system was upgraded to typhoon intensity by late on the 22nd. Typhoon Meari possessed a very asymmetric circulation, elongated somewhat to the north and northeast. Meari became a strong 100-kn/115 mph typhoon by late on the 23rd, and was assigned the name Quinta by PAGASA. After reaching 120 kn/140 mph on the 24th, its strength plateaued for the rest of the day. As it passed 70 miles south of Okinawa early on the 26th, Meari was slowly weakening. The cyclone ceased movement on the 27th about 170 miles west of Okinawa as it became lodged between two anticyclones. A slow northward drift began later that day and vertical wind shear associated with the subtropical jet stream began to take its toll on Meari. By the 29th, Meari was beginning its approach to the Japanese island of Kyūshū. Typhoon Meari made landfall over the southern tip of Kyūshū around midday local time with maximum sustained winds of 70 kn/80 mph. Meari weakened back into a tropical storm late on the 29th. The forward motion began to accelerate as Meari increasingly interacted with the westerlies. The system was followed until the 30th, when it became a nontropical low, which continued tracking eastwards through the north Pacific.

== Impact ==
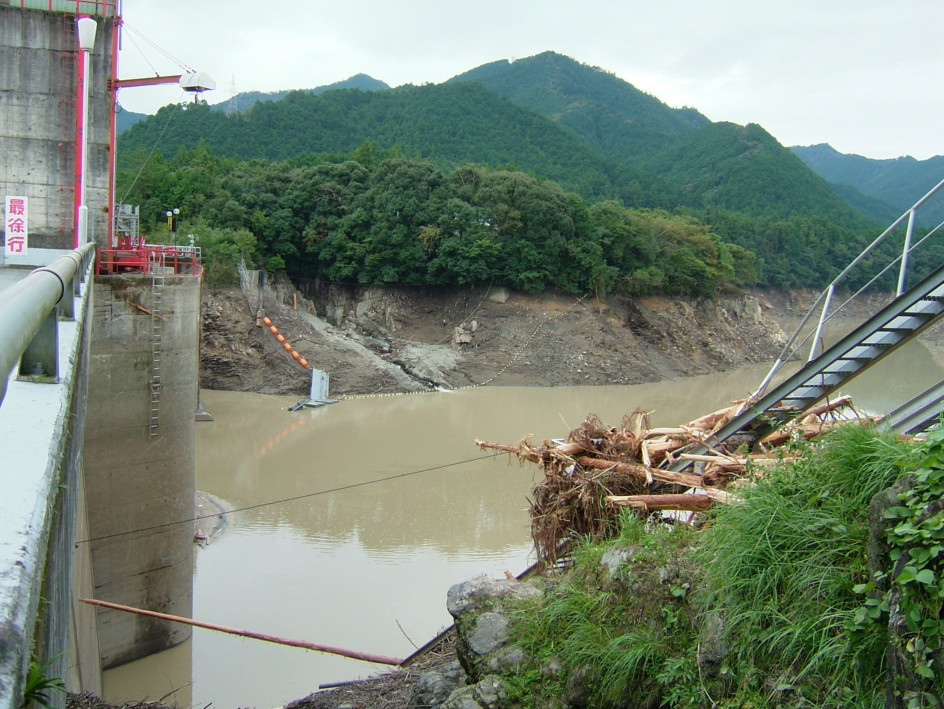
Damages caused by Meari in Misedani Dam

The highest wind gust reported was 118 mph (53 m/s) in Kagoshima early on the 29th. The lowest pressure measured during the passage of Meari was 975.5 mb, also at Kagoshima on the 29th. Three tornadoes were spawned in Japan, with two touching down in Okinawa Prefecture and one in Aichi Prefecture. The heaviest rains in Japan were saved for Osawe, where 904 mm fell between late on the 24th and the 30th, with 741 mm falling between late on the 28th and 29th. Reports indicate that at least 18 people died with several more reported missing as a result of Typhoon Meari. The worst affected areas were the prefectures of Mie and Ehime in Japan where torrential rains caused widespread flooding and mudslides destroyed several homes. Train and ferry services were suspended, stranding thousands of people. Damages from the storm amounted to $798 million (2004 USD).

== See also ==
- Other tropical cyclones named Meari
- Other tropical cyclones named Quinta
- Typhoon Ma-on (2004)
- Typhoon Tokage (2004)
