= Typhoon Yancy (1993) =

Pacific typhoon in 1993

Typhoon Yancy (Tasing)
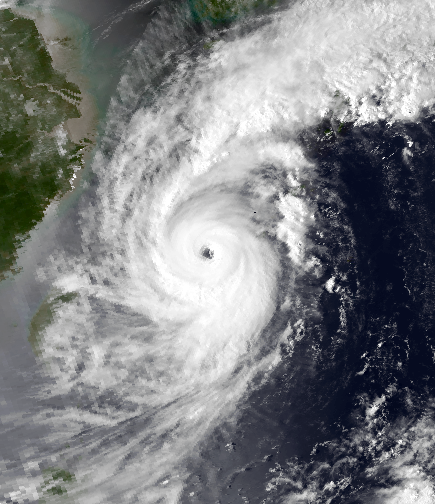
- Typhoon Yancy near peak intensity on September 2

Meteorological history
- Formed: August 29, 1993
- Extratropical: September 4, 1993
- Dissipated: September 7, 1993

Very strong typhoon
- 10-minute sustained (JMA)
- Highest winds: 175 km/h (110 mph)
- Lowest pressure: 925 hPa (mbar); 27.32 inHg

Category 4-equivalent super typhoon
- 1-minute sustained (SSHWS/JTWC)
- Highest winds: 240 km/h (150 mph)
- Lowest pressure: 910 hPa (mbar); 26.87 inHg

Overall effects
- Fatalities: 48
- Injuries: 266
- Damage: $1.67 billion (1993 USD)
- Areas affected: Ryukyu Islands and Japan
- IBTrACS
- Part of the 1993 Pacific typhoon season

Typhoon Yancy, known in the Philippines as Typhoon Tasing, was one of the costliest and most intense tropical cyclones to strike Japan on record. Yancy was the sixth typhoon of the annual typhoon season and sixth tropical cyclone overall to impact Japan that year. Developing out of an area of disturbed weather in the open northwest Pacific on August 29, 1993, the precursor to Yancy tracked westward and quickly intensified to reach tropical storm strength on August 30. Just two days later, the tropical storm reached typhoon intensity as it recurved towards the northeast. A period of rapid intensification followed, allowing Yancy to quickly reach super typhoon intensity. The strong tropical cyclone reached peak intensity on September 2 with maximum sustained winds of 175 km/h (109 mph). (Note: All measurements of maximum sustained wind are taken over a period of 10 minutes unless otherwise noted.) The following day Yancy made its first landfall on Iōjima at nearly the same strength; over the course of the day the typhoon would make three subsequent landfalls on Japanese islands. Land interaction forced the tropical cyclone to weaken, and after its final landfall on Hiroshima Prefecture, Yancy weakened below typhoon intensity. After emerging into the Sea of Japan, Yancy transitioned into an extratropical cyclone; these remnants persisted as they meandered in the sea before dissipating completely on September 7. (Note: All monetary estimates and statistics are in 1993 United States dollars unless otherwise noted.)

== Meteorological history ==
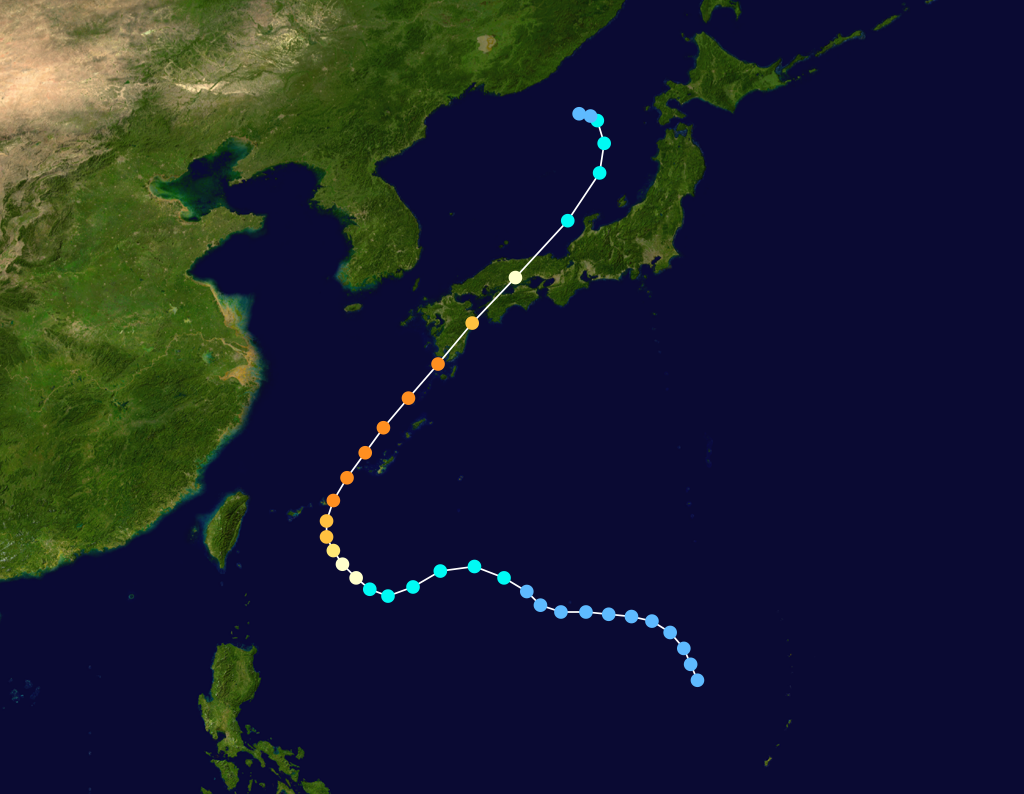
Map plotting the storm's track and intensity, according to the Saffir–Simpson scale Map key Saffir–Simpson scale Tropical depression (≤38 mph, ≤62 km/h) Tropical storm (39–73 mph, 63–118 km/h) Category 1 (74–95 mph, 119–153 km/h) Category 2 (96–110 mph, 154–177 km/h) Category 3 (111–129 mph, 178–208 km/h) Category 4 (130–156 mph, 209–251 km/h) Category 5 (≥157 mph, ≥252 km/h) Unknown Storm type Tropical cyclone Subtropical cyclone Extratropical cyclone, remnant low, tropical disturbance, or monsoon depression

In late August, an area of convection began to persist in the open northwestern Pacific, well removed from any landmasses. The Joint Typhoon Warning Center (JTWC) started to monitor the disturbance at 1200 UTC on August 27. Aided by a southwesterly monsoonal wind flow and in an area of favorable conditions, the system organized, and at 0600 UTC on August 28, the JTWC issued a Significant Tropical Weather Advisory on the disturbance. Organization continued throughout the day's course, and the system was classified by the Japan Meteorological Agency (JMA) as a tropical depression at 0000 UTC on August 29. Shower activity at that time began to coalesce more closely around the system's center of circulation, prompting the JTWC to issue a Tropical Cyclone Formation Alert an hour later. Based on satellite intensity estimates, the agency also reclassified the system as a tropical depression at 0600 UTC that day. At the time, the depression was positioned roughly 1,000 km (620 mi) northwest of Guam. Through tropical cyclogenesis, the primitive depression tracked westward, in the direction of Taiwan. At 0000 UTC on August 30, the JMA upgraded the system to tropical storm intensity, followed by the JTWC six hours later based on a ship report in the vicinity of the cyclone.

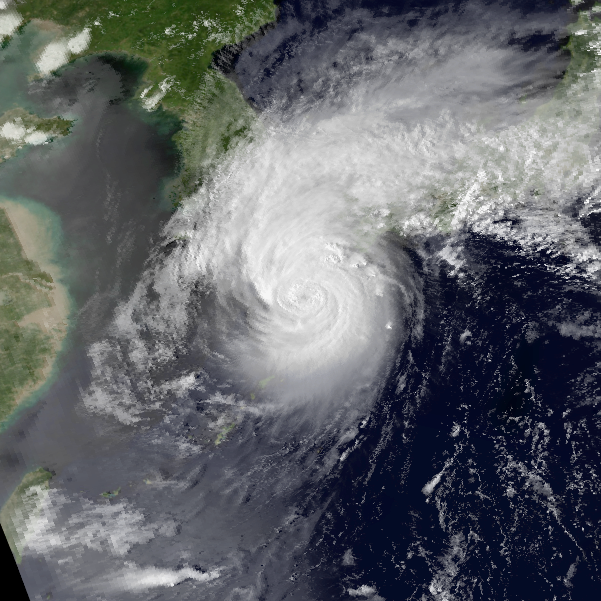
Yancy making landfall on Kyushu on September 3

Yancy continued to gradually intensify, and according to the JMA the storm reached severe tropical storm intensity at 1200 UTC on August 31. By this time, Yancy started to curve towards the northwest. Later that day, the tropical storm began developing a banding eye feature. This was reflected in satellite intensity estimates, prompting the JTWC to upgrade Yancy to typhoon status. The JMA maintained the storm's severe tropical storm status through this period, though on September 1 the agency initiated 3-hour position fixes in contrast to their usual 6-hour fix procedure; at 0300 UTC that day the JMA upgraded Yancy to typhoon intensity. Upon upgrade, Yancy was estimated to have a minimum barometric pressure of 965 mbar (hPa; 28.50 inHg). At the time the typhoon was positioned approximately 500 km (310 mi) south-southwest of Okinawa. Rapid intensification ensued, and just nine hours later the JTWC estimated Yancy's winds to have equated to that of a Category 3 on the Saffir–Simpson scale. The JTWC upgraded the typhoon to super typhoon status at 0600 UTC on September 3 as one-minute sustained winds were estimated to have reached the threshold of 130 knots (240 km/h; 150 mph). Three hours later the JMA estimated Yancy to have peaked in strength with ten-minute sustained winds of 175 km/h (109 mph) and a minimum barometric pressure of 925 mbar (925 hPa; 27.3 inHg); this intensity would be held for the following 18 hours.

Only minimal weakening occurred in the immediate hours following peak intensity, and at around 0600 UTC on September 3, Yancy passed directly over Iōjima. Tracking rapidly northeastward at around 40 km/h (25 mph), Yancy made a second landfall on Kagoshima Prefecture within an hour later at the same intensity; at the time this made Yancy the strongest tropical cyclone ever to make landfall on Japan since Typhoon Shirley in 1965, 28 years prior. Land interaction with Kyushu further weakened Yancy, but the system remained at typhoon intensity upon its landfall on western Ehime Prefecture at around 1400 UTC that day. The JTWC estimated that the typhoon was still maintaining Category 3 intensity upon landfall on Ehime. This particular landfall greatly weakened Yancy, and despite the storm briefly emerging over intra-insular waters, was only a minimal typhoon by the time of its final landfall on Hiroshima Prefecture at 1600 UTC that day. Shortly following the tropical cyclone's final landfall, Yancy weakened below typhoon intensity to severe tropical storm classification. Continuing to track northeast, the weakening cyclone underwent extratropical transition and was assessed to have fully transitioned into an extratropical storm by 1200 UTC on September 4 while located in the northeastern Sea of Japan. Yancy's extratropical remnants persisted for several days as they meandered within the Sea of Japan before dissipating by 1200 UTC on September 7.

== Preparations ==
In preparation for Typhoon Yancy, bus and rail services in potentially affected areas were halted. Some schools were also closed. Though no initial evacuation orders were made, caution was advised to people living in Kyushu. Forecasts prior to Yancy's landfalls on Japan raised fears that the storm would be one of the strongest in the past 50 years to strike the country. In Okinawa, 15,000 passengers were stranded after most flights arriving and departing from the island were cancelled by airlines. An additional 330 domestic flights were cancelled across western Japan, stranding 5,600 persons. As Yancy neared the country, approximately 4,600 people were forced to evacuate from flood and landslide-prone areas of Kagoshima. Pop star Michael Jackson postponed a scheduled performance in Taiwan, potentially as a result of Typhoon Yancy. However, these claims were denied by his tour promoters and associated staff.

== Impact and aftermath ==
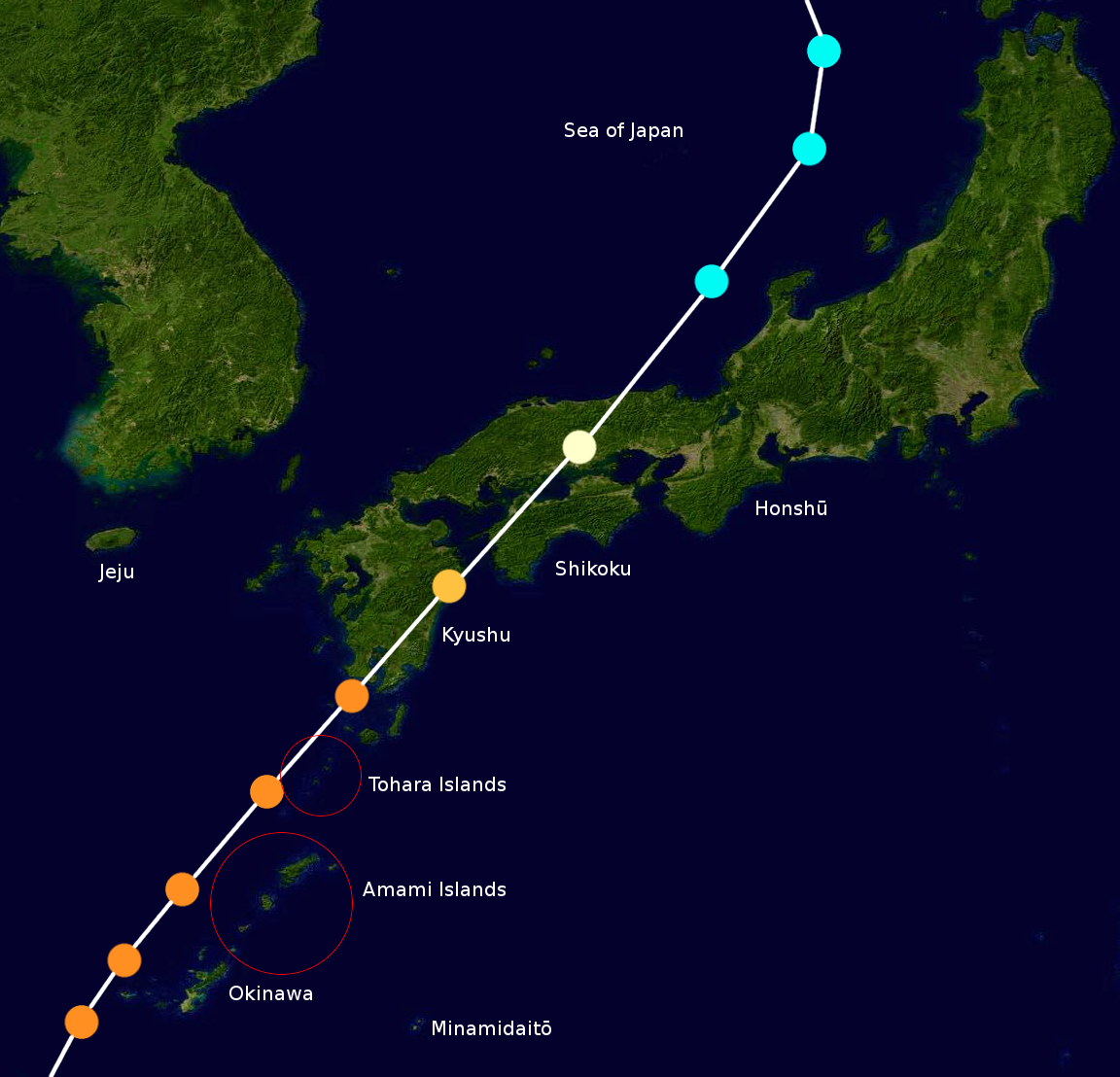
Enlarged track of Typhoon Yancy between September 2 and September 4 depicting the storm's path in relation to several Northwest Pacific islands.

Upon Yancy's first landfall on Japan, the tropical cyclone became the strongest tropical cyclone to strike the country in over three decades. Across Japan, a total of 10,447 homes were inundated, with 1,892 other homes suffering complete destruction. Yancy killed 48 people and injured 266 others. Most of the deaths were the result of widespread flooding and landslides. Overall, damage costs in Japan as a result of Yancy reached ¥175.5 billion (US$1.67 billion). Unadjusted for inflation, this would have at the time made Yancy the third costliest tropical cyclone in Japanese history, only behind Typhoon Bess in 1982 and Typhoon Mireille in 1991. Insured losses from Yancy in Japan reached ¥97.7 billion (US$928 million). As a result of precautionary measures taken during the course of Yancy's trek through the country, at least 245,000 rail passengers and 15,000 airline passengers became stranded. Yancy's potential impacts were exacerbated by the impacts of Typhoon Robyn in mid-August and significant rainstorms a week prior to Yancy's landfall. In the direct aftermath of Typhoon Yancy, personnel from the Japan Self-Defense Forces were dispatched to rescue victims of the typhoon and recover dead bodies.

=== Ryukyu Islands ===
Passing within 110 km (68 mi) of Okinawa Island on September 2, Yancy brought gusty winds to the island. At Kadena Air Base, sustained winds reached as high as 88 km/h (55 mph), with gusts peaking at 142 km/h (88 mph). Rainfall on the island peaked at 397 mm (15.6 in) in Gusuku. The same station observed 360 mm (14 in) of rain over a 24-hour period. Of all islands in Okinawa Prefecture, Kume Island sustained the worst impacts from Yancy. The eye of the typhoon passed directly over the island, resulting in a station observing a record low barometric pressure of 928 mbar (928 hPa; 27.4 inHg). The same station also clocked a wind gust at 194 km/h (121 mph). Large swaths of sugarcane crops were damaged. On the coast, strong waves damaged fishing boats and ports. One person who went missing on the coast was later found dead. Strong winds inland unroofed buildings and toppled power lines. Twenty-two buildings were completely destroyed, with an additional 516 sustaining at least partial damage. Total damage costs on Kume and Naha islands amounted to ¥1.8 billion (US$17.3 million), and two people were killed.

Heavy agricultural damage also occurred on Ishigaki Island. Sugarcane crops were severely impacted, with losses reaching ¥35 million (US$330,000) and accounting for approximately 80.5% of all sugarcane crops on the island. Significant damage was also inflicted on other fruit and vegetable crops. Total agricultural losses on Ishigaki reached ¥43.6 million (US$410,000). On nearby Taketomi Island, similar agricultural damage ensued. To the east, the Miyako Islands also suffered extensive damage. Heavy rainfall triggered widespread flooding, which took a toll on infrastructure and agriculture. Ten buildings sustained at least partial damage, with one completely demolished. In addition, three dikes were breached by floodwater. Roughly 4,478 ha (11,065 ac) of farmland were damaged. Agricultural damage there amounted to ¥309 million (US$2.9 million).

=== Kyushu ===
Costliest Known Japan typhoons
| Rank | Typhoon | Season | Damage (2025 USD) |
|---|---|---|---|
| 1 | Mireille | 1991 | $23.6 billion |
| 2 | Hagibis | 2019 | $21.8 billion |
| 3 | Saomai | 2000 | $16.8 billion |
| 4 | Jebi | 2018 | $16.7 billion |
| 5 | Songda | 2004 | $15.9 billion |
| 6 | Faxai | 2019 | $12.6 billion |
| 7 | Tokage | 2004 | $12.1 billion |
| 8 | Bart | 1999 | $11.1 billion |
| 9 | Bess | 1982 | $7.94 billion |
| 10 | Fran | 1976 | $3.73 billion |

Kyushu was the first of Japan's four main islands to be impacted by Yancy and suffered the worst effects as a result. Floods and power outages were widespread, with about 700,000 homes on the island without power at one point. Kagoshima Prefecture was the location of the typhoon's first and second landfalls and as such major damage occurred there. Rainfall in the prefecture peaked at 375 mm (14.8 in) in Takatoge. However, higher hourly rainfall rates were reported at stations in Mizobe and Makurazaki. Off the coast, strong storm surge was reported, resulting in damage along the coast. In Sata, waves were estimated to be 11.5 m (38 ft) high. Widespread flash floods and landslides were commonplace across Kagoshima. Nine people were killed in a single landslide incident. Another landslide in Kinpo, Kagoshima trapped 20 people. In Kawanabe, a single mudslide killed nine persons and destroyed 20 homes. A total of 31 landslides occurred throughout Kaghsima. Widespread power outages also took place, which affected 384,000 houses. Prefecture-wide, 209 homes were demolished and 626 sustained partial damage. Overall, damage costs in Kagoshima amounted to ¥43.9 billion (US$420 million), and 33 lives were lost. An additional 163 persons were injured.

Despite not being a point of landfall, Miyazaki Prefecture was the most severely affected region of Japan. Many of the highest rainfall totals recorded in Japan took place in Miyazaki Prefecture. A weather station in Mitate, located in the town of Hinokage, observed 577 mm (22.7 in) of rain, far more than any other station in the country. The same station reported 543 mm (21.4 in) of its rainfall total in a 24-hour period, which still exceeded the storm totals of any other Japanese weather station. High storm surge generated by Yancy caused coastal inundation in Hyūga, which flooded the first floors of many buildings. Several fishing boats in a harbor off of Nobeaka capsized due to wave action. River swelling caused by heavy precipitation and flooding washed away four bridges prefecture-wide. Further inland many homes were unroofed as a result of strong winds. A total of 347 homes were damaged, and of those 38 were destroyed. Overall damage totaled ¥88.8 billion (US$840 million), primarily as a result of agricultural loss, and two people were killed.

==== Northern Kyushu ====
Damage in Kumamoto Prefecture was considerably less in comparison with Miyazaki and Kagoshima prefectures but nonetheless remained significant. Winds gusting as high as 94 km/h (58 mph) resulted in the destruction of several homes. The strong winds also toppled and uprooted numerous trees, including a patch of trees 1,670 hectares (4,100 acres) in area in the southern portion of the prefecture. Landslides were also commonplace, blocking homes and destroying additional buildings. Damage in the prefecture reached ¥30.5 billion (US$290 million), primarily to forestry, where damage in that sector alone totaled ¥21 billion ($200 million). One person in Kumamoto Prefecture was killed after a falling incident while five others were injured.

Ōita Prefecture was primarily impacted by heavy rainfall from Yancy, resulting in widespread flooding. Precipitation peaked at 422 mm (16.6 in) in Ōita, the second highest rainfall amount in Japan. Four people were killed after two buildings collapsed as a result of an overflowing river. Another person was killed due to a flood-triggered landslide. The floods destroyed 28 homes and inundated another 302 across Ōita. In addition to residential damage, the floods inundated large swaths of agricultural land, leading to soil erosion. Crops, in particularly pears, were greatly affected. Approximately 1,074 hectares (2,650 acres) of arable land was eroded. Across the prefecture, agricultural damage amounted to ¥26.8 billion (US$250 million). The floods also caused widespread clean water shortages, particularly in Kusu District. Overall, damage caused by Yancy in Ōita Prefecture was estimated at ¥42.4 billion (US$402 million), and seven people were killed.

Nagasaki, Saga, and Fukuoka prefectures were less affected by Yancy relative to other regions in Kyushu. Nagasaki Prefecture was primarily impacted by the typhoon's storm surge. Wave heights peaked at 8 m (26 ft) off of Miiraki. The wave action caused some coastal damage. Further inland, damage lessened, and limited to a single landslide. Damage in Nagasaki totaled ¥1.7 billion (US$16 million). In Saga, excessive rainfall caused widespread crop damage and suspended various transportation services. Damage estimates in Saga were slightly less than in Nagasaki, totaling ¥1.6 billion (US$15 million). Flooding in Fukuoka Prefecture resulted in two landslides and destroyed four buildings. Eighty-nine other buildings were inundated by floodwater. Damage there totaled ¥2.4 billion (US$23 million), and one person was killed.

=== Shikoku ===
Shikoku was the second of Japan's four main islands that Yancy made landfall on. Ehime Prefecture in Shikoku was the site of Yancy's third landfall. A high storm surge swamped coastal regions, damaging fishing boats and other shoreline structures. A total of 33 boats were reportedly damaged. Heavy rainfall blocked roads, flooded buildings, and triggered landslides. Inundation was reported in 1,237 buildings prefecture wide. Twelve landslides occurred, and dikes were breached in 13 locations. Power outage also occurred in earnest in Ehime Prefecture, with as many as 37,300 households losing electricity at one point. Two people were killed, and five others were injured. Damage in Ehime as a result of Yancy totaled ¥4.7 billion (US$44 million). Damage was much more considerable in Kōchi Prefecture, where damage totaled ¥5 billion (US$48 million). Rainfall peaked at 384 mm (15.1 in) in Funato; this was the highest rainfall total on Shikoku Island.

== See also ==
- Typhoon Bart (1999)
- Typhoon Wynne (1980)
- Typhoon Robyn (1993)
- Typhoon Jebi (2018)
