= Typhoon Bess (1982) =

Pacific typhoon

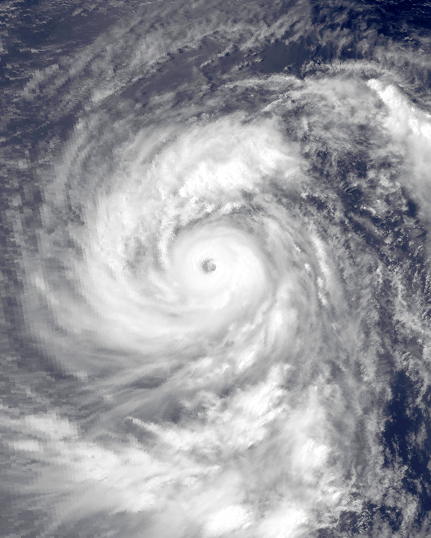
- Bess at its peak intensity on July 29

Meteorological history
- Formed: July 21, 1982
- Extratropical: August 3, 1982
- Dissipated: August 9, 1982

Violent typhoon
- 10-minute sustained (JMA)
- Highest winds: 230 km/h (145 mph)
- Lowest pressure: 900 hPa (mbar); 26.58 inHg

Category 5-equivalent super typhoon
- 1-minute sustained (SSHWS/JTWC)
- Highest winds: 260 km/h (160 mph)
- Lowest pressure: 901 hPa (mbar); 26.61 inHg

Overall effects
- Fatalities: 95 total
- Damage: $2.38 billion (1982 USD)
- Areas affected: Japan
- IBTrACS
- Part of the 1982 Pacific typhoon season

Typhoon Bess was a powerful, deadly, and destructive tropical cyclone, which was the deadliest typhoon to hit Japan since Typhoon Tip in 1979. Bess was also the strongest violent typhoon recorded in the month of July. The eleventh tropical storm, sixth typhoon, and first super typhoon of the 1982 Pacific typhoon season, the system first developed on July 21. Two days later, it was upgraded into a tropical storm, and subsequently began to intensify while tracking northwest. Bess attained typhoon intensity on July 24, before it briefly turned southwest. After turning north-northwest, the typhoon entered a period of rapid intensification and late on July 28 reached peak winds of 230 km/h (145 mph). After turning north, Bess began to weaken as it encountered less favorable conditions. On August 1, Bess was downgraded into a tropical storm. Shortly after that, the storm struck southeastern Japan, and on August 2 merged with a low pressure area atop of the Sea of Japan.

Typhoon Bess cut through a 400 km (250 mi) swath that included the most populated portion of Japan. Bess caused ¥591.6 billion (US$2.38 billion) in damage and 95 casualties. Furthermore, 119 others were hurt. Four people were killed due to landslides, while two other individuals were buried alive. A series of landslides stranded about 2,000 people, including 1,500 children. In all, 43 dwellings were destroyed and 17,000 homes were flooded. A total of 59 roads were impassable, 42 bridges were destroyed and 785 landslides occurred. Fifteen railway lines were disrupted due to torrential rainfall. In addition, 2,857 acres of farmland were flooded, 101 bridges were washed out and roads were damaged at more than 1,000 locations. Two boats sunk. Roughly 25,000 people were displaced. Following the storm, 2,100 policeman and firefighters dug through debris to rescue people. Following the season, the name Bess was retired.

== Meteorological history ==
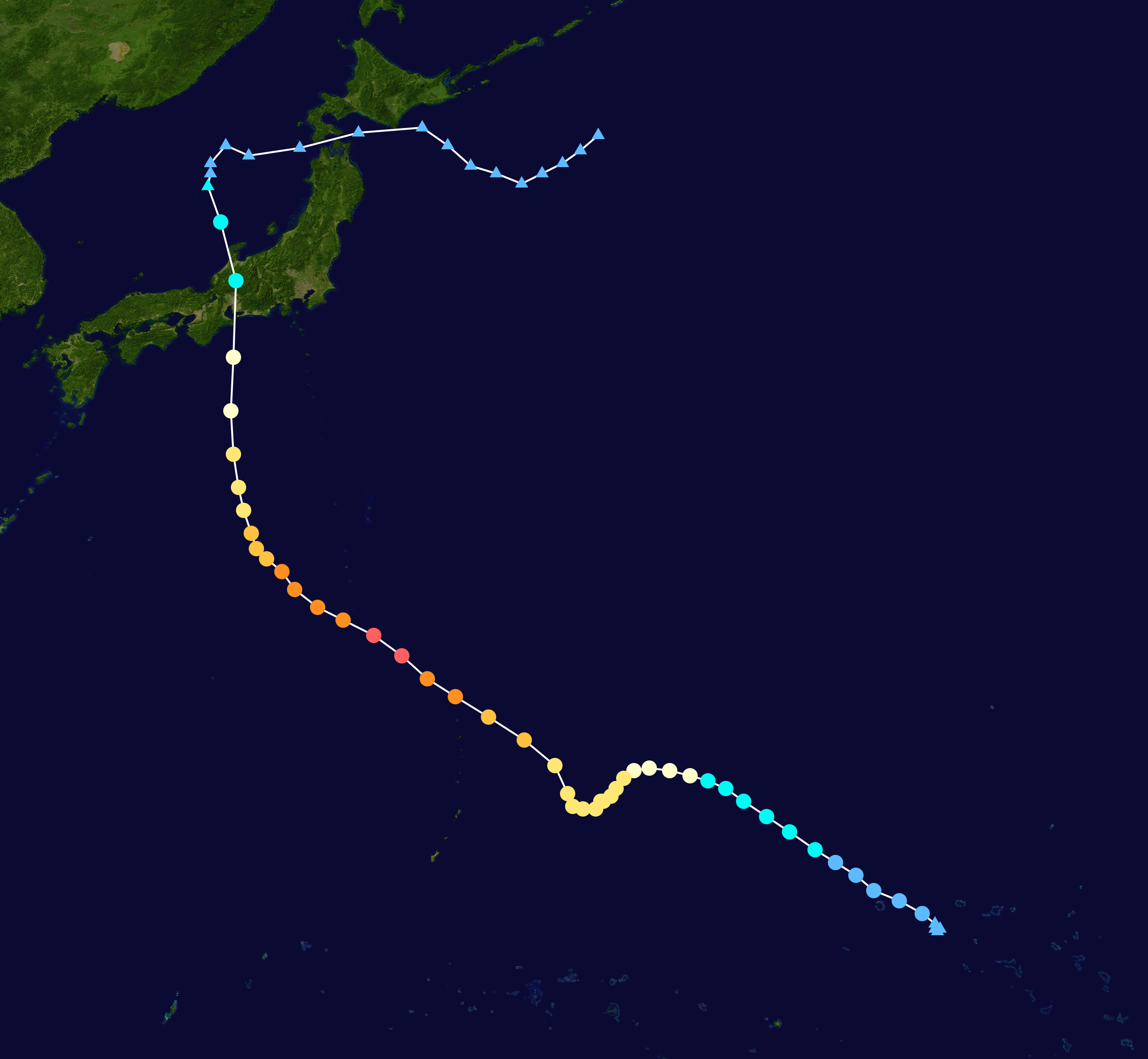
Map plotting the storm's track and intensity, according to the Saffir–Simpson scale Map key Saffir–Simpson scale Tropical depression (≤38 mph, ≤62 km/h) Tropical storm (39–73 mph, 63–118 km/h) Category 1 (74–95 mph, 119–153 km/h) Category 2 (96–110 mph, 154–177 km/h) Category 3 (111–129 mph, 178–208 km/h) Category 4 (130–156 mph, 209–251 km/h) Category 5 (≥157 mph, ≥252 km/h) Unknown Storm type Tropical cyclone Subtropical cyclone Extratropical cyclone, remnant low, tropical disturbance, or monsoon depression

A large monsoon trough was anchored south of Guam towards the end of July. By July 21, three areas of disturbed weather had formed. Although the westernmost disturbance dissipated, the easternmost two continued to develop, one of which would later become Typhoon Andy. A Tropical Cyclone Formation Alert (TCFA) was issued for the easternmost system at 1900 UTC on July 21 as sea level pressures fell and convection increased within the vicinity of the disturbance. After becoming better organized, (Note: Wind estimates from the JMA and most other basins throughout the world are sustained over 10 minutes, while estimates from the United States-based Joint Typhoon Warning Center are sustained over 1 minute. 10 minute winds are about 1.14 times the amount of 1 minute winds.) the Japan Meteorological Agency (JMA) started monitoring the system. (Note: The Japan Meteorological Agency is the official Regional Specialized Meteorological Center for the western Pacific Ocean.) Later on July 22, the Joint Typhoon Warning Center (JTWC) started monitoring the same system as it developed rainbands and a further increase in thunderstorm activity. Initially, the JTWC correctly predicted the low to move northwest. Hurricane Hunters indicated that the low and mid-level centers were not vertically aligned. On July 23, both the JMA and JTWC upped the depression into a tropical storm. Bess then began to intensify. At 0600 UTC on July 24, Bess was upgraded to a severe tropical storm by the JMA. After the formation of an eye, both agencies classified Bess as a typhoon.

By July 24, Typhoon Bess began to move north-northwest and slow down due to the westward building of the subtropical ridge to the north. The JTWC expected Bess to turn west; however, Bess instead turned southwest on July 25 due to interactions with a trough. By this time, the JMA estimated winds of 130 km/h (80 mph). Shortly thereafter, the JTWC increased the intensity of the typhoon to 175 km/h (110 mph), equivalent to a Category 2 hurricane on the Saffir-Simpson Hurricane Wind Scale (SSHWS). After performing a small loop, the storm maintained its intensity until July 27, when the JMA raised the wind speed of Bess to 180 km/h (110 mph). The typhoon then turned north-northwest while slowly intensifying. On July 28, the system turned northwest along the southwestern edge of the ridge. That afternoon, the JMA estimated winds of 185 km/h (115 mph). Subsequently, Typhoon Bess entered an episode of rapid deepening. Only a few hours later, the JMA reported that Bess had attained its peak intensity of 230 km/h (145 mph), which it would maintain for 12 hours. At 0000 UTC on July 29, according to the JMA, the typhoon attained a minimum barometric pressure of 900 mbar (27 inHg). Later that morning, the JTWC estimated that Bess attained its peak intensity of 260 km/h (160 mph), a Category 5 hurricane-equivalent on the SSHWS, though JMA data suggests that Bess was weakening by this time. At this time, Typhoon Bess was located 460 km (285 mi) to the southeast of Iwo Jima.

After slowing down further, Bess curved north along the southern periphery of a weakness in the subtropical ridge. Even though the JTWC expected Bess to recurve well east of Japan within 36 hours, this did not materialize. On July 30, the JMA lowered the intensity of the typhoon to 190 km/h (120 mph). During the evening hours of July 31, the JMA further the intensity of the storm to 170 km/h (105 mph). Bess continued to weaken while accelerating. The next day, August 1, the JMA downgraded Bess into a severe tropical storm. Later that morning, the JMA downgraded Bess into a tropical storm. Around this time, the tropical storm made landfall along central Honshu. Shortly thereafter, the JTWC reported that Bess was no longer a typhoon. On August 2, Bess merged with a low pressure area over the Sea of Japan. The JMA ceased monitoring the typhoon midday on August 3.

== Impact and aftermath ==
Typhoon Bess cut through a 400 km (250 mi) swath across the most populated portions of Japan; damage was reported in 30 of the 45 provinces. As a precaution, flood warnings were issued near Tokyo, which warned of possible landslides. An "alert" was issued for the Bonin Islands for vessels. By Mount Hidegadake, in Nara, a peak rainfall total of 1,078 mm (42.4 in), including 922 mm (36.3 in) in 24 hours. A peak hourly total of 103 mm (4.1 in) was recorded in Toba in Mie. A maximum wind of 104 km/h (65 mph) was recorded at Tsukubasan in Ibaraki.

Costliest Known Japan typhoons
Rank	Typhoon	Season	Damage (2025 USD)
1	Mireille	1991	$23.6 billion
2	Hagibis	2019	$21.8 billion
3	Saomai	2000	$16.8 billion
4	Jebi	2018	$16.7 billion
5	Songda	2004	$15.9 billion
6	Faxai	2019	$12.6 billion
7	Tokage	2004	$12.1 billion
8	Bart	1999	$11.1 billion
9	Bess	1982	$7.94 billion
10	Fran	1976	$3.73 billion

Overall, Super Typhoon Bess was responsible for ¥591.6 billion (US$2.38 billion) in damage and 95 fatalities. (Note: All currencies are converted from Japanese yen to United States Dollars using this with an exchange rate of the year 1982.) According to police reports, 26 people were initially missing. A total of 119 were hurt. Four people were killed in Osaka due to landslides, while two people were buried alive in Yokohama via mudslides. At the foot of Mount Fuji, a series of mudslides buried 36 vehicles, killed one person and injured five policemen. The landslides stranded approximately 2,000 persons, including 1,500 primary school children on a camping trip. In Mie, Bess was considered the worst storm to affect the city in 23 years, where 17 fatalities occurred and seven were initially listed missing. Elsewhere, in Nara, a couple was killed and a boy was hurt. Throughout western Japan, five people were rendered missing in heavy rains that caused at least five landslides and damaged 15 automobiles. Along Tokyo Bay, high waves from Typhoon Bess left windows 11 stories high coated with salt. Although Tokyo was on the eastern edge of the storm, large trees were uprooted nevertheless due to high winds. Five people were wounded in the city. Many cars and trucks were stranded due to mudslides; air traffic was also paralyzed.

In all, 43 dwellings were destroyed and 17,000 homes were flooded. Due to the storm, 59 roads were impassable. In addition, 42 bridges were destroyed and 785 landslides occurred. According to railroad authorities, 15 railroad lines were either totally or partially disrupted due to torrential rains, forcing the cancellation of 27 scheduled trains and delaying 211 others. Police reports suggest that 2,857 acres (1,155 ha) of farmland were flooded, 101 bridges were washed out, and roads were damaged at 1,094 places. Additionally, 25 ships ran aground or were washed away and two boats sunk. A total of 25,000 individuals were left homeless, including 24,702 people that were evacuated from their homes. Following the storm, 2,100 police and firemen dug through mud and debris in search of the missing.

=== Retirement ===
The name Bess was previously retired in 1974 and replaced with Bonnie. However, when the list of typhoon names was changed to incorporate male names in 1979, the name was re-introduced to the roster. After this usage of the name Bess, it was retired for the second time and was replaced with Brenda.

== See also ==
- List of violent typhoons
- Typhoon Nangka (2015)
- Typhoon Judy (1982) – also hit Japan the following month
- Typhoon Tip
- Typhoon Tokage (2004)
- Typhoon Hagibis
