= Typhoon Jebi =

Pacific typhoon in 2018

Typhoon Jebi (Maymay)
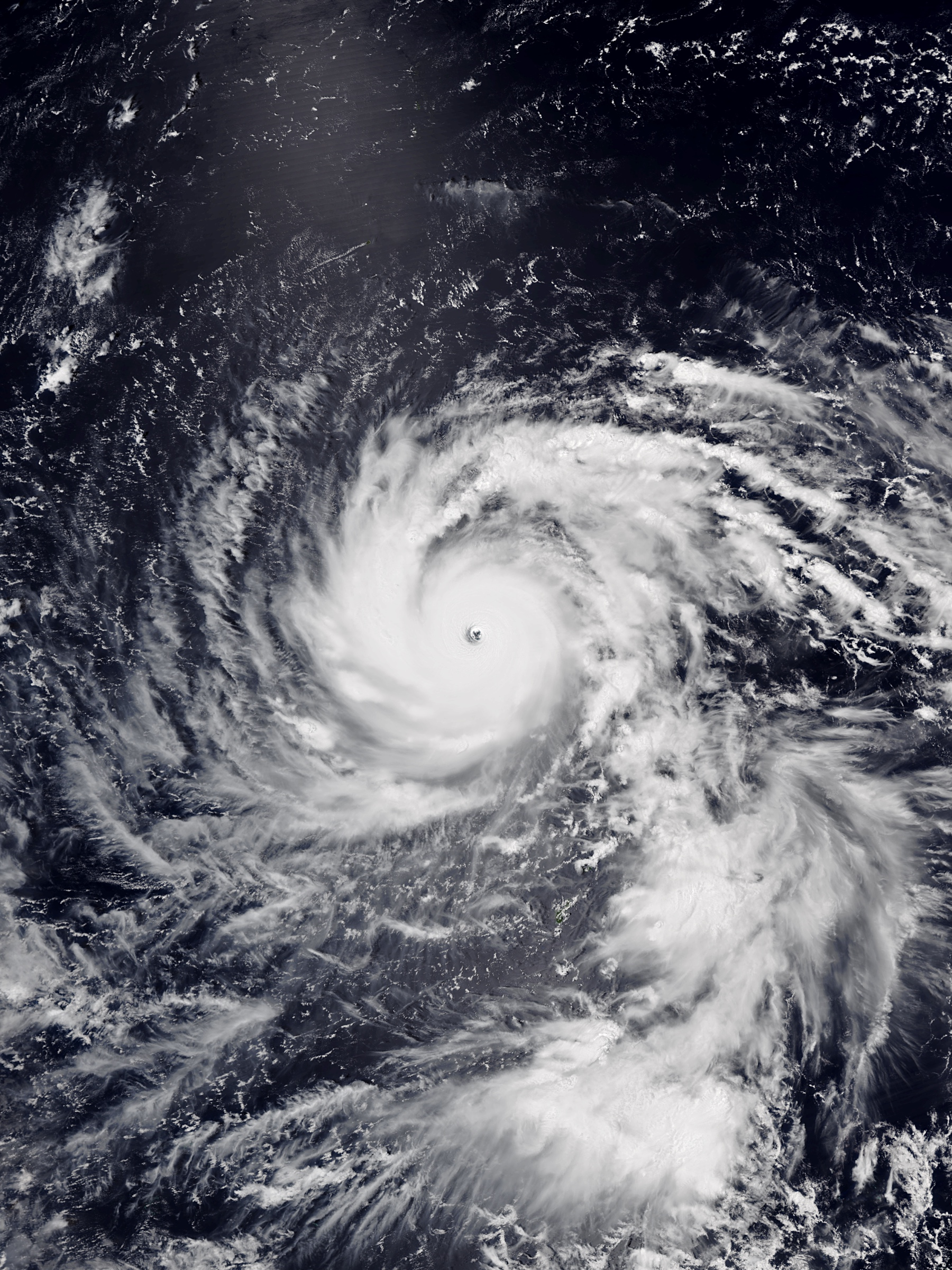
- Jebi at peak intensity northwest of Guam on August 31

Meteorological history
- Formed: August 26, 2018
- Extratropical: September 5, 2018
- Dissipated: September 9, 2018

Violent typhoon
- 10-minute sustained (JMA)
- Highest winds: 195 km/h (120 mph)
- Lowest pressure: 915 hPa (mbar); 27.02 inHg

Category 5-equivalent super typhoon
- 1-minute sustained (SSHWS/JTWC)
- Highest winds: 285 km/h (180 mph)
- Lowest pressure: 907 hPa (mbar); 26.78 inHg

Overall effects
- Fatalities: 21 total
- Damage: $13 billion (2018 USD) (Fourth-costliest typhoon on record in nominal terms)
- Areas affected: Northern Mariana Islands, Taiwan, Japan, Russian Far East
- IBTrACS
- Part of the 2018 Pacific typhoon season

Typhoon Jebi, (Note: The name Jebi (Korean: 제비, [ˈt͡ɕe̞(ː)bi]) was contributed by South Korea and refers to the barn swallow (Hirundo rustica) in Korean.) known in the Philippines as Typhoon Maymay, was the costliest typhoon in Japan's history in terms of insured losses. Jebi formed from a tropical disturbance south-southwest of Wake Island on August 26 and became the twenty-first named storm of the 2018 Pacific typhoon season on August 27. Amid favorable environmental conditions, Jebi quickly strengthened into a typhoon on August 29 as it headed west and rapidly intensified as it passed the Northern Mariana Islands on August 30.

Jebi reached its peak intensity as a Category 5-equivalent typhoon on August 31, with 10-minute sustained winds of 195 km/h (120 mph), 1-minute sustained winds of 285 km/h (180 mph), and a minimum pressure of 915 hPa (mbar; 27.02 inHg). Afterwards, Jebi began a slow weakening trend as it turned northwest, briefly passing through the Philippine Area of Responsibility on September 2. Jebi accelerated north-northeast towards Japan on September 3 as it interacted with the westerlies, and made landfalls over Shikoku and near Kobe early on September 4. Jebi quickly weakened over land and became an extratropical cyclone later that day over the Sea of Japan. Its remnants moved over the Russian Far East before dissipating on September 9.

Jebi was the strongest typhoon to make landfall in Japan since Yancy in 1993 and left significant effects across the Kansai region. The typhoon's powerful winds, which broke wind records at 100 Japanese weather stations, damaged nearly 98,000 houses and left nearly 3 million customers without electricity after blowing down power lines. Heavy rains combined with wind and storm surge to flood over 700 houses and cause widespread damage to infrastructure, including several shrines and historical buildings. Agricultural damage from the adverse weather conditions was significant, with losses from the agricultural, forestry, and fishing industries valued at almost JP¥47 billion (US$430 million). (Note: All currencies are converted to United States Dollars using data from the International Monetary Fund published by the World Bank.) Fruits were blown off trees, crops were lodged, and power outages affected the storage of livestock and produce. Storm surge inundated part of Kansai International Airport, which, combined with wind and rain damage to the terminals, forced the airport to close from September 4 to 13. Furthermore, access to the airport was cut off when the typhoon blew a tanker into the bridge connecting the airport to the mainland; repairs to the bridge were completed seven months later. Fourteen people were killed in Japan—mostly from falls and flying debris—and 980 were injured. Insured losses were estimated at US$13–14 billion, of which more than a third was from Osaka Prefecture.

Elsewhere, Jebi brought minor flooding to the Northern Mariana Islands as it passed to the north on August 31. Heavy swells produced by Jebi caused large waves along the coast of Taiwan that resulted in seven fatalities (including a suspected suicide) from September 2 to 3. As an extratropical cyclone on September 5, Jebi produced gusty winds across the Russian Far East, causing power outages and injuring three.

Despite the extensive economic losses brought on by the storm, the name Jebi was not retired after the 2018 season, and was used again in 2024, though it would be retired following that season due to its similar pronunciation to that of a derogatory word in the Croatian language. In 2026, the name will be replaced with Narae, which means 'wing' in Korean.

== Meteorological history ==
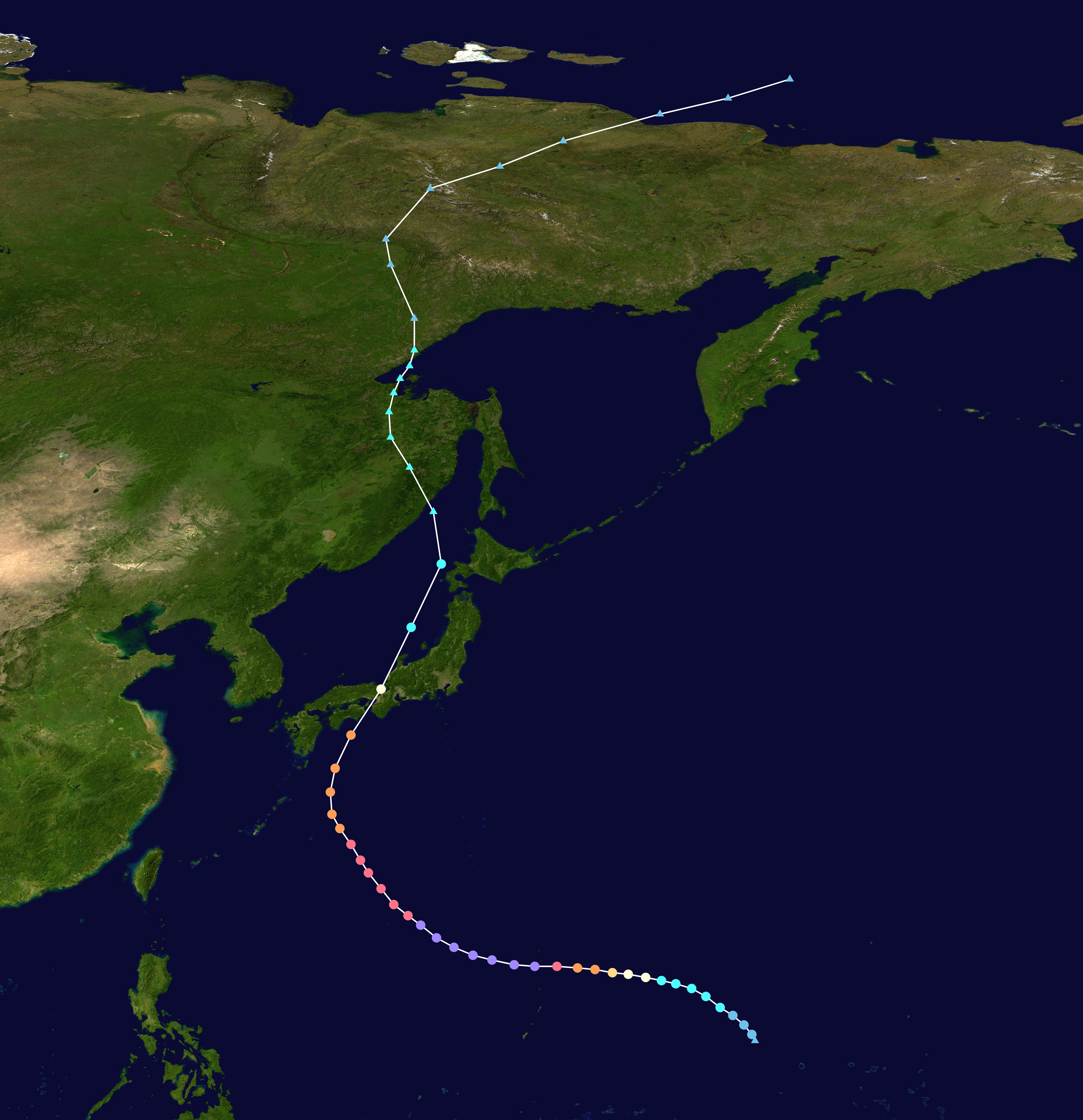
Map plotting the storm's track and intensity, according to the Saffir–Simpson scale Map key Saffir–Simpson scale Tropical depression (≤38 mph, ≤62 km/h) Tropical storm (39–73 mph, 63–118 km/h) Category 1 (74–95 mph, 119–153 km/h) Category 2 (96–110 mph, 154–177 km/h) Category 3 (111–129 mph, 178–208 km/h) Category 4 (130–156 mph, 209–251 km/h) Category 5 (≥157 mph, ≥252 km/h) Unknown Storm type Tropical cyclone Subtropical cyclone Extratropical cyclone, remnant low, tropical disturbance, or monsoon depression

A tropical disturbance was first noted by the Joint Typhoon Warning Center (JTWC) on August 26 about 1,020 km (635 mi) south-southwest of Wake Island. The disturbance increased in organization over the next few hours, with rainbands wrapping into a developing low-level circulation center. The Japan Meteorological Agency (JMA) classified the system as a tropical depression at 18:00 UTC on August 26, (Note: The Japan Meteorological Agency is the official Regional Specialized Meteorological Center for the western Pacific Ocean.) with the JTWC following suit at 06:00 UTC the next day. Further development was expected as the depression tracked northwest around a subtropical ridge, with high sea surface temperatures and low wind shear ahead in the system's anticipated path. The JMA deemed the cyclone to have attained tropical storm status at 18:00 UTC on August 27 and assigned it the name Jebi; with this, Jebi became the twenty-first named storm of the 2018 Pacific typhoon season. The JTWC similarly upgraded the system six hours later. With favorable winds aloft aiding the development of thunderstorm activity, Jebi continued to strengthen as it turned more westward under the influence of the subtropical ridge. The JMA upgraded Jebi to a severe tropical storm at 12:00 UTC on August 28 as its maximum sustained winds increased to 95 km/h (60 mph). (Note: Wind estimates from the JMA and most other basins throughout the world are sustained over 10 minutes, while estimates from the JTWC are sustained over 1 minute. On average, 1-minute winds are about 12% higher than 10-minute winds.)

Amid the favorable environment, Jebi began to intensify more quickly on August 29, reaching typhoon status at 06:00 UTC as it developed an eye feature visible on microwave satellite imagery. Rapid intensification commenced later that day, as a central dense overcast blossomed over the system's center. From August 29 to 30, Jebi's satellite presentation swiftly improved as its eye cleared out and contracted to a diameter of 19 km (12 mi), while convection surrounding the eye deepened. The JTWC analyzed that Jebi intensified into a super typhoon by 18:00 UTC on August 30 with winds of 260 km/h (160 mph), (Note: The JTWC defines a "super typhoon" as a tropical cyclone within the western North Pacific with sustained winds of at least 240 km/h (150 mph).) representing an increase of 95 km/h (60 mph) in the past 24 hours. The JMA reported that Jebi reached its peak intensity at 00:00 UTC on August 31 with winds of 195 km/h (120 mph) and a central pressure of 915 hPa (mbar; 27.02 inHg); the JTWC estimated that Jebi's winds continued to increase and peaked at 285 km/h (180 mph) at 06:00 UTC.

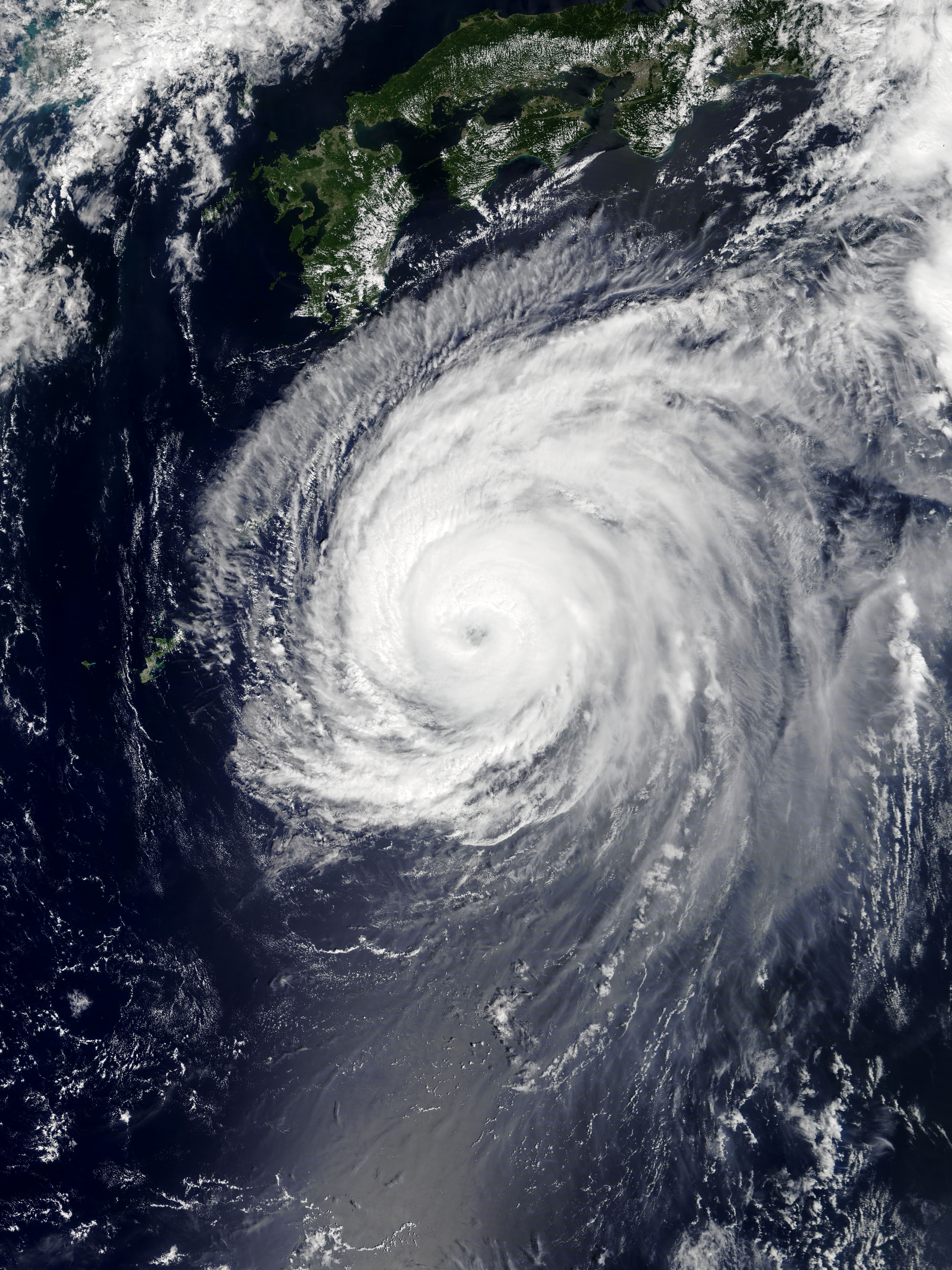
Jebi on September 3, a day before landfall in Japan

Jebi's intensity leveled off thereafter as an eyewall replacement cycle began, with the original eyewall encircled by a larger, secondary eyewall. The cycle completed by 21:00 UTC on August 31 while Jebi began to curve northward through a weakness in the subtropical ridge. Drier air then began to impinge on the southern portion on the circulation, resulting in continued weakening. At the same time, upper-level winds pushed subsiding air over the western part of Jebi's circulation, causing its convection to warm. As a result, the JTWC assessed that Jebi had weakened below super typhoon status by 18:00 UTC on September 1. Travelling northwestwards, Jebi entered the Philippine Area of Responsibility (PAR) at 06:00 UTC on September 2 and received the local name Maymay; Jebi exited the PAR roughly 12 hours later. Slow weakening continued through September 3 as dry air and subsidence continued to affect Jebi's circulation. Despite this, Jebi managed to maintain a ragged yet well-defined eye.

Later on September 3, an extratropical cyclone approaching from the northwest began to accelerate Jebi north-northeast, while interaction with the mid-latitude westerlies caused Jebi to begin extratropical transition. Racing poleward, Jebi made landfall over southern Tokushima Prefecture at around 03:00 UTC on September 4, possessing winds of around 155 km/h (100 mph). In the next two hours, Jebi crossed Osaka Bay and made another landfall around 05:00 UTC near Kobe, Hyōgo Prefecture. Land interaction and increasing wind shear rapidly weakened the system as it crossed Japan, with the JTWC declaring that Jebi was no longer a tropical cyclone at 12:00 UTC on September 4, just hours after it entered the Sea of Japan. The JMA downgraded Jebi to a severe tropical storm at 18:00 UTC, before later declaring it post-tropical at 00:00 UTC on September 5 just offshore Terneysky District, Russia. Over the next two days, the remnants of Jebi headed generally north over the Russian Far East while gradually weakening, crossing the 60th parallel north before the JMA ceased tracking the system at 06:00 UTC on September 7.

== Impact ==
=== Northern Mariana Islands ===
Jebi passed just north of the Northern Mariana Islands as an intensifying typhoon on August 31, necessitating the issuance of a typhoon warning for the islands of Agrihan, Alamagan, and Pagan. A high surf advisory and small craft advisory were issued for Saipan and Tinian as heavy swells affected the islands. The small size of the typhoon's inner core meant that damage in Agrihan, Alamagan, and Pagan was limited to minor flooding.

=== Taiwan ===
When Jebi veered northward on September 2 and 3, east of the Ryukyu Islands, it brought large waves to the east coast of Taiwan. On September 2, at Mystery Beach in Nan'ao Township, Yilan County, five people riding all-terrain vehicles were swept out to sea and drowned; at least four of the bodies were recovered. To prevent further loss of life, Mystery Beach was closed to the public from September 5 to 14. At Neipi Beach in Su'ao Township, a passerby drowned while he was rescuing an eight-year-old girl on September 2. One more death occurred there the next day: a woman was swept out to sea in what was suspected by an eyewitness to be a suicide.

=== Japan ===
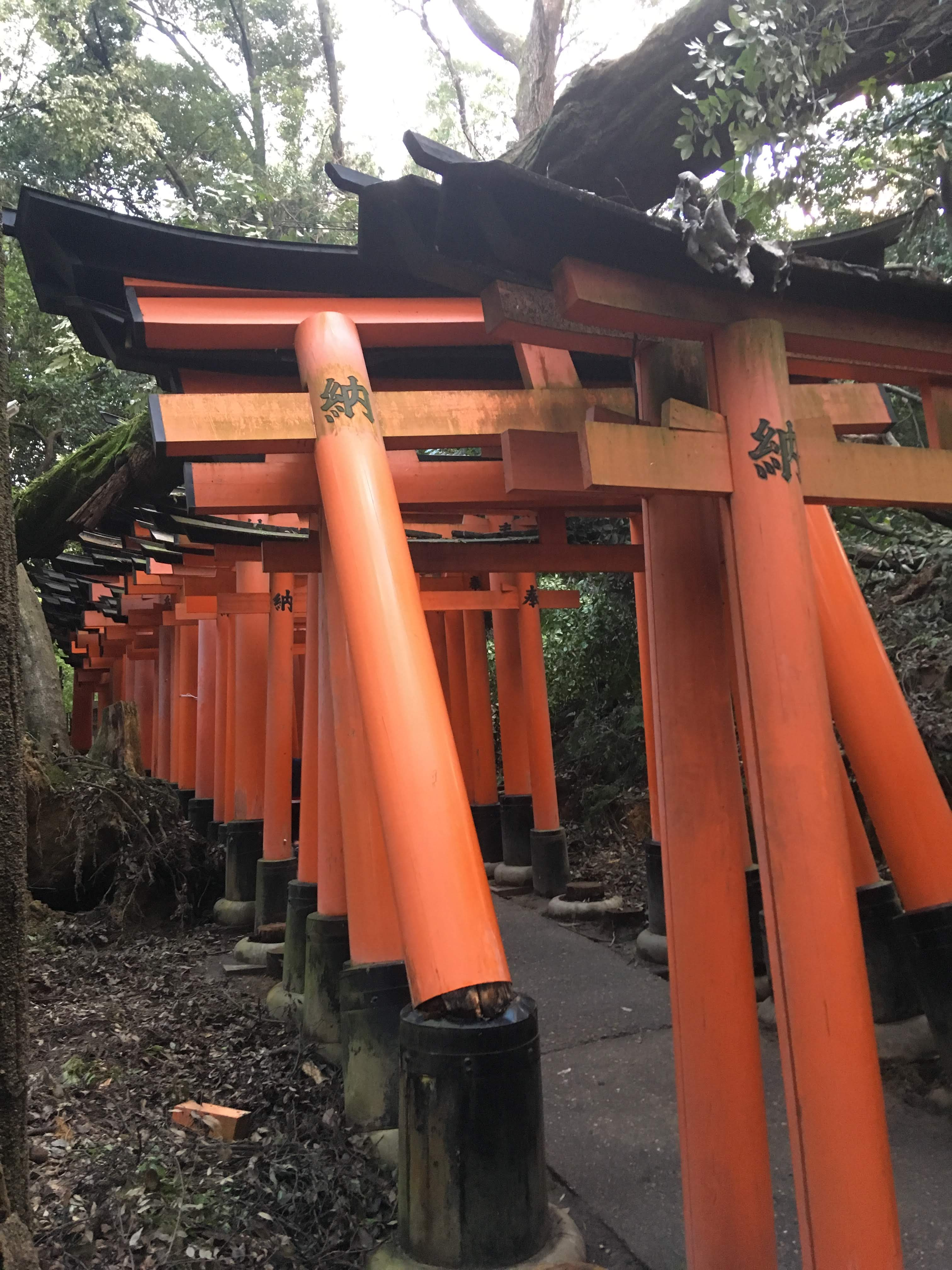
The torii of the Fushimi Inari Shrine in Kyoto, damaged by fallen trees

Typhoon Jebi was the most intense tropical cyclone to make landfall on Japan since Typhoon Yancy in 1993, causing significant damage in the Kansai region. Fourteen people were killed across the country and 46 others were seriously injured, while another 934 people received minor injuries. The typhoon's strong winds damaged 97,910 houses, of which 68 collapsed and 833 suffered major damage, while heavy rains and storm surge flooded another 707 houses. Another 6,527 buildings were damaged. The General Insurance Association of Japan reported that nearly JP¥1.07 trillion (US$9.69 billion) in payouts had been made by March 2019, of which JP¥601 billion (US$5.44 billion) was in Osaka Prefecture alone. Insured losses were estimated at US$13–14 billion in December 2019, placing Jebi as the costliest typhoon to hit Japan in terms of insured losses.

Ahead of the storm, emergency evacuation orders were issued for parts of Osaka, Hyōgo, Nara, Wakayama, and Kagawa prefectures. Evacuation advisories were issued for Ishikawa, Fukui, Yamanashi, Nagano, Gifu, Aichi, Kyoto, Okayama, Tokushima, and Kōchi prefectures. The Fire and Disaster Management Agency reported that in total, about 8,000 residents evacuated to 1,667 shelters in 24 prefectures. In Osaka, department stores and other commercial facilities were closed. Public schools were closed in the cities of Kobe, Kyoto, Nara, and Osaka, as well as in Wakayama Prefecture. Several tourist attractions were closed to visitors, including Universal Studios Japan, the Kyoto City Zoo, the Kyoto Aquarium, Nijō Castle, and the Kyoto Imperial Palace. JR-West suspended operations in the Keihanshin region on September 4. Services along the Tōkaidō Shinkansen, as well as the San'yō Shinkansen between Shin-Ōsaka and Hiroshima stations, were halted on September 4. At least 912 flights in and out of Osaka were cancelled. Factories across the Kansai and Chūbu regions were closed, with notable companies affected including Daikin, Panasonic, Daihatsu, and Toyota. Major department store operators, such as J. Front Retailing, H_{2}O Retailing, and Takashimaya, closed their Kansai outlets. Japanese Prime Minister Shinzo Abe cancelled a trip to Kyushu to oversee state response efforts.

Jebi set new records for 10-minute maximum sustained winds at 53 weather stations and broke records for wind gusts at 100 weather stations in Japan, mostly on September 4. The highest sustained winds from Jebi were recorded at Cape Muroto, at 48.2 m/s (174 km/h; 108 mph). At Kansai International Airport, a gust of 58.1 m/s (209 km/h; 130 mph) was recorded, which was significantly higher than the previous record set by Typhoon Cimaron just 12 days earlier. Significant winds occurred even in urban areas, with downtown Wakayama experiencing maximum sustained winds of up to 39.7 m/s (143 km/h; 89 mph) and gusts reaching 57.4 m/s (207 km/h; 128 mph). Similarly, the financial center of Osaka, Chūō-ku, recorded a maximum gust of 47.4 m/s (171 km/h; 106 mph). The maximum storm surge produced by Jebi was 3.29 m (10.8 ft) in Osaka, surpassing the previous record of 2.93 m (9.6 ft) from the 2nd Muroto Typhoon (Typhoon Nancy) in 1961.

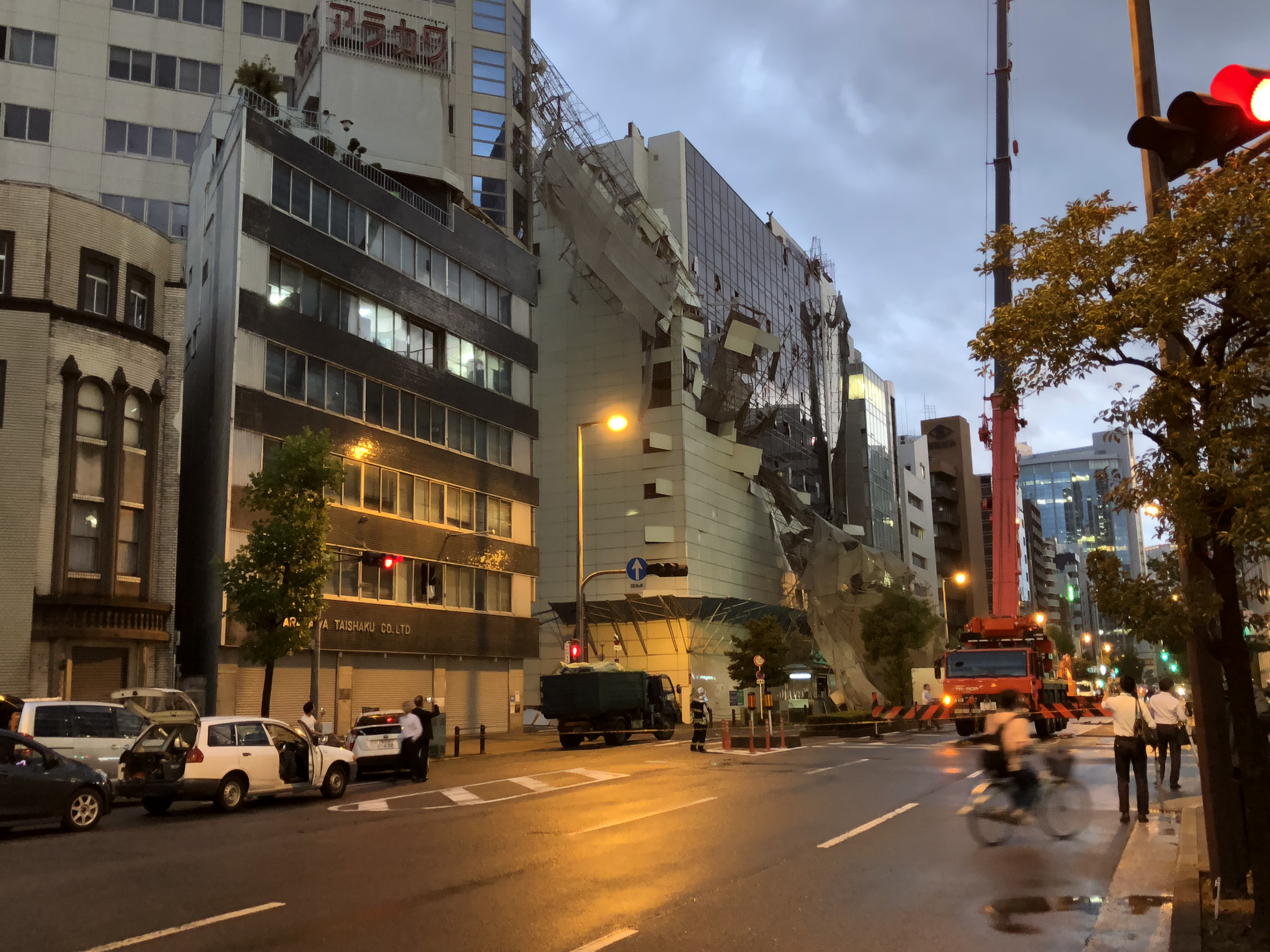
Collapsed scaffolding in Osaka near Higobashi Station

Across the Kansai Region, massive blackouts occurred as the typhoon blew down transmission lines, with over 2.2 million customers of Kansai Electric Power Company losing power. Restoration works were fully completed only on September 20, having been hampered by fallen trees, collapsed houses, and landslides. Other significant power outages were reported in the Chūbu region, with Chubu Electric Power reporting 695,320 blackouts. Elsewhere, 16,040 households in the Hokuriku region lost power, and another 14,000 households in the Tōhoku region were left without power.

Numerous incidents resulted from Jebi's high winds and heavy rain. In Shiga Prefecture, a man died after the warehouse he was working in collapsed. A man in Osaka was blown off the second floor of a house and fell to his death; at least five more people in the eponymous prefecture were killed by falls or flying debris. Another man died after he fell from a roof in Mie Prefecture. Part of the glass ceiling at Kyōto Station collapsed, injuring multiple people. In Hachiōji, Tokyo, four people suffered cuts when a metal object fell from a building's roof. In neighboring Saitama Prefecture, an elderly man in Kawagoe was injured when he was blown over by a strong gust and a woman was hit by a flying object. Strong winds in Tochigi Prefecture caused a woman to fall and hurt her shoulder, while two others fell while attempting to repair a window on the second floor of their house. Fallen trees trapped 160 elementary school students on a school trip in Kyoto. At the Nintendo headquarters in Kyoto, the logo on the exterior of the building was damaged by strong winds. The LED lighting on the Tsūtenkaku tower in Osaka was damaged by flying debris and made inoperable. An oil refinery in Sakai operated by JXTG Nippon Oil & Energy was forced to partially shut after a cooling tower sustained damage. Several shrines across Japan were damaged: the Kasuga Grand Shrine in Nara had its arrival hall damaged by fallen trees, the torii at the entrance of Oji Shrine in Tokyo collapsed, while the torii on the east side of the Naganokengokoku Shrine in Matsumoto, Nagano, was destroyed. One of the three honden of Ono Shrine in Shiojiri, Nagano, which were built in 1672, was severely damaged by a fallen tree. The hall of worship at Hirano Shrine in Kyoto was destroyed and 400 cherry blossom trees on the shrine's grounds were felled. At the nearby Nishi Hongan-ji, a UNESCO World Heritage Site, a wall on the southern face of the compound collapsed and a segment of the roof of the worship hall was peeled off. Part of the cliff on the south side of Ueda Castle collapsed, while an iron roof tile was blown off at the Katakurakan building in Suwa, Nagano. The trunk of a 400-year-old beech tree in the Shirakami-Sanchi was snapped by Jebi's strong winds. Along Osaka Bay, the typhoon's storm surge carried away several shipping containers. The Port of Kobe lost 42 containers, which were eventually recovered 10 days later. Some residential areas surrounding the bay were inundated after the storm surge overtopped coastal defenses. In Nishinomiya, the rising waters caused 187 cars at an auctioneer's lot to catch fire by short-circuiting their electrical systems.

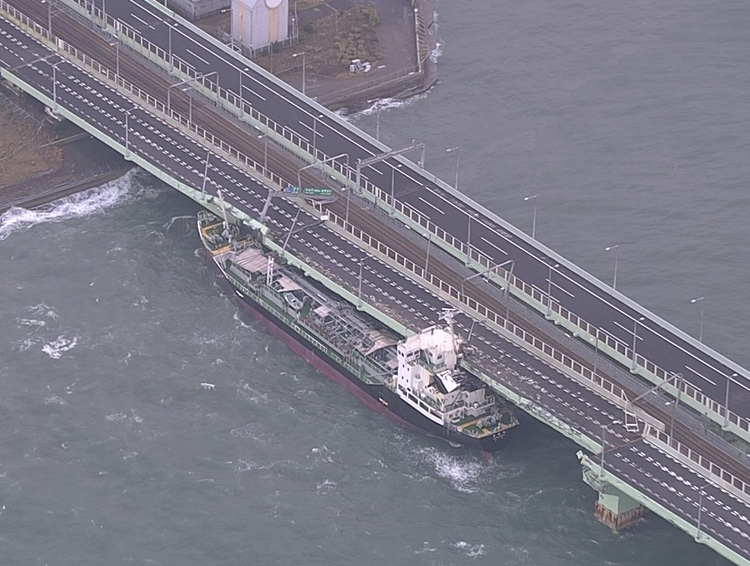
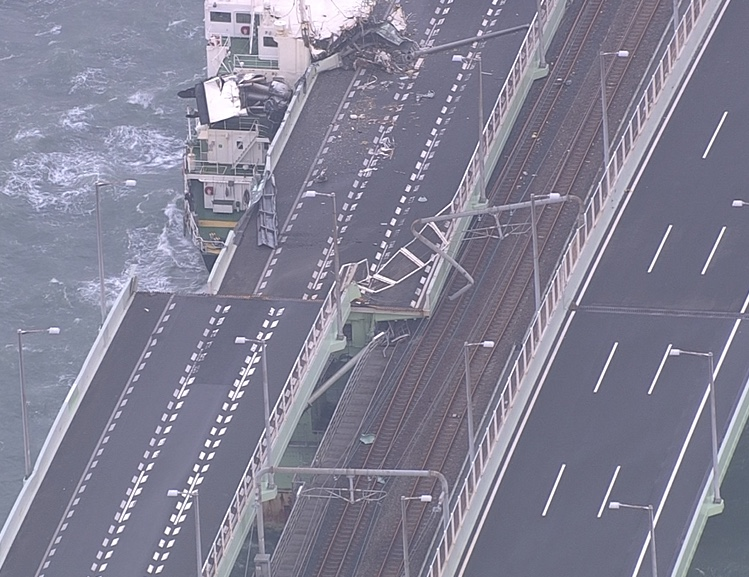
Damage to the Kansai International Airport Access Bridge, showing an unmoored tanker allided with the bridge, shearing off a section of the road deck.

Kansai International Airport was forced to close on September 4, as waves reaching 5 m (16 ft) in height overtopped coastal defenses and left a runway and cargo facilities inundated. Access to the island was cut off on September 4 when a 2,591-tonne tanker was unmoored by Jebi's strong winds and collided with the only bridge connecting the airport to the mainland. As a result, 8,000 passengers and staff were stranded in the airport and were evacuated by ferries and speedboats on September 5. The 11 crewmembers on board the tanker were uninjured and were rescued by the coast guard. The terminals experienced power outages, leaving passengers to wait without air conditioning. A passenger sustained minor injuries from a window broken by the storm. Partial operation of the airport resumed on September 6, with flights allowed to operate out of the undamaged Terminal 2. Other flights were redirected to nearby Itami and Kobe Airports. Terminal 1 began to resume operations on September 13 and the previously flooded runway reopened on September 14. The airport reopened fully on September 21, following repairs to an electric power facility and a baggage claim area at Terminal 1. Repairs to the access bridge continued and were completed in April 2019. The temporary closure of the airport—the country's third largest and a major export hub for manufacturers in the region—sparked fears that Japan's industrial production would suffer. The absence of international flights caused tourism in Osaka to decline sharply, with about a quarter of retailers reporting their sales had halved in a survey conducted by Nikkei. The damage to transport infrastructure from a combination of Jebi and other natural disasters contributed to a larger-than-expected contraction in Japan's gross domestic product for the third quarter of 2018.

Costliest known Pacific typhoons (adjusted for inflation)
Rank	Typhoon	Season	Damage (2025 USD)
1	4 Doksuri	2023	$30.1 billion
2	4 Mireille	1991	$23.6 billion
3	5 Hagibis	2019	$21.8 billion
4	5 Saomai	2000	$17.3 billion
5	5 Jebi	2018	$16.7 billion
6	4 Songda	2004	$15.9 billion
7	5 Yagi	2024	$15.1 billion
8	2 Fitow	2013	$14.4 billion
9	4 Faxai	2019	$12.6 billion
10	4 Tokage	2004	$12.1 billion

The agricultural, forestry, and fishing industries suffered significantly, with damage amounting to JP¥46.81 billion (US$42.39 million) across 33 prefectures. A total of 30,996 hectares (76,590 acres) of cropland was damaged by the typhoon's strong winds, which blew down fruit trees and caused lodging of vegetable and feed crops. About JP¥11.88 billion (US$107.6 million) worth of crops were lost. Across 31 prefectures, 42,918 incidents of damage to agricultural infrastructure were reported, resulting in JP¥20.10 billion (US$182.0 million) of damage. Another 131 fishing boats and 406 aquaculture facilities were damaged. In the Tōkai region, some pigs suffocated after power outages stopped ventilation of the stalls they were kept in. In Tōhoku and Hokkaido, many apple farms suffered from apple scab after the typhoon, exacerbating losses. At an aquaculture facility off Kushimoto, Wakayama, run by Kindai University, 600 bluefin tuna were lost after the cage containing them broke, resulting in losses of JP¥100 million (US$906,000). Extended power outages prevented farmers from shipping raw milk in at least five prefectures. Jebi served to worsen damage inflicted by Typhoon Cimaron, which passed over roughly the same areas two weeks earlier. At the end of September, the Ministry of Agriculture, Forestry and Fisheries announced it would be providing subsidies and grants to help farmers offset repair and reconstruction costs.

=== Russian Far East ===
Jebi passed Sakhalin Oblast as an extratropical cyclone on September 5. State media reported that the island experienced typhoon-force winds and precipitation above 30 mm (1.2 in). Fifteen settlements—or about 4,500 people—lost power. The town of Makarov was left without drinking water after a mudflow contaminated a reservoir. Train services on the island were halted. Classes in the administrative center of Yuzhno-Sakhalinsk were suspended, and 13 flights at the local airport were delayed. In nearby Khabarovsk Krai, a state of emergency was declared in Sovetskaya Gavan because of the inclement weather. Strong winds collapsed the roofs of a school and kindergarten; at the former, the falling roof fractured a girl's ankle. In Vanino, a fallen tree left a woman in intensive care while her child suffered minor scratches.

== See also ==
- Weather of 2018
- Tropical cyclones in 2018
- 2018 Hokkaido Eastern Iburi earthquake – struck nearby Hokkaido just two days after Jebi
- 1934 Muroto typhoon – caused widespread devastation along eastern Osaka Bay
- Typhoon Vera (1959) – the strongest and deadliest typhoon to impact Japan
- Typhoon Nancy (1961) – another powerful typhoon that caused major impacts in Osaka
- Typhoon Cimaron (2018) – made landfall in Japan two weeks before Jebi
- Typhoon Trami (2018) – hit Japan a month after Jebi
- Typhoon Hagibis (2019) – impacted Japan in October and became one of the costliest typhoons on record
