= Typhoon Mireille =

Pacific typhoon in 1991

Typhoon Mireille (Rosing)
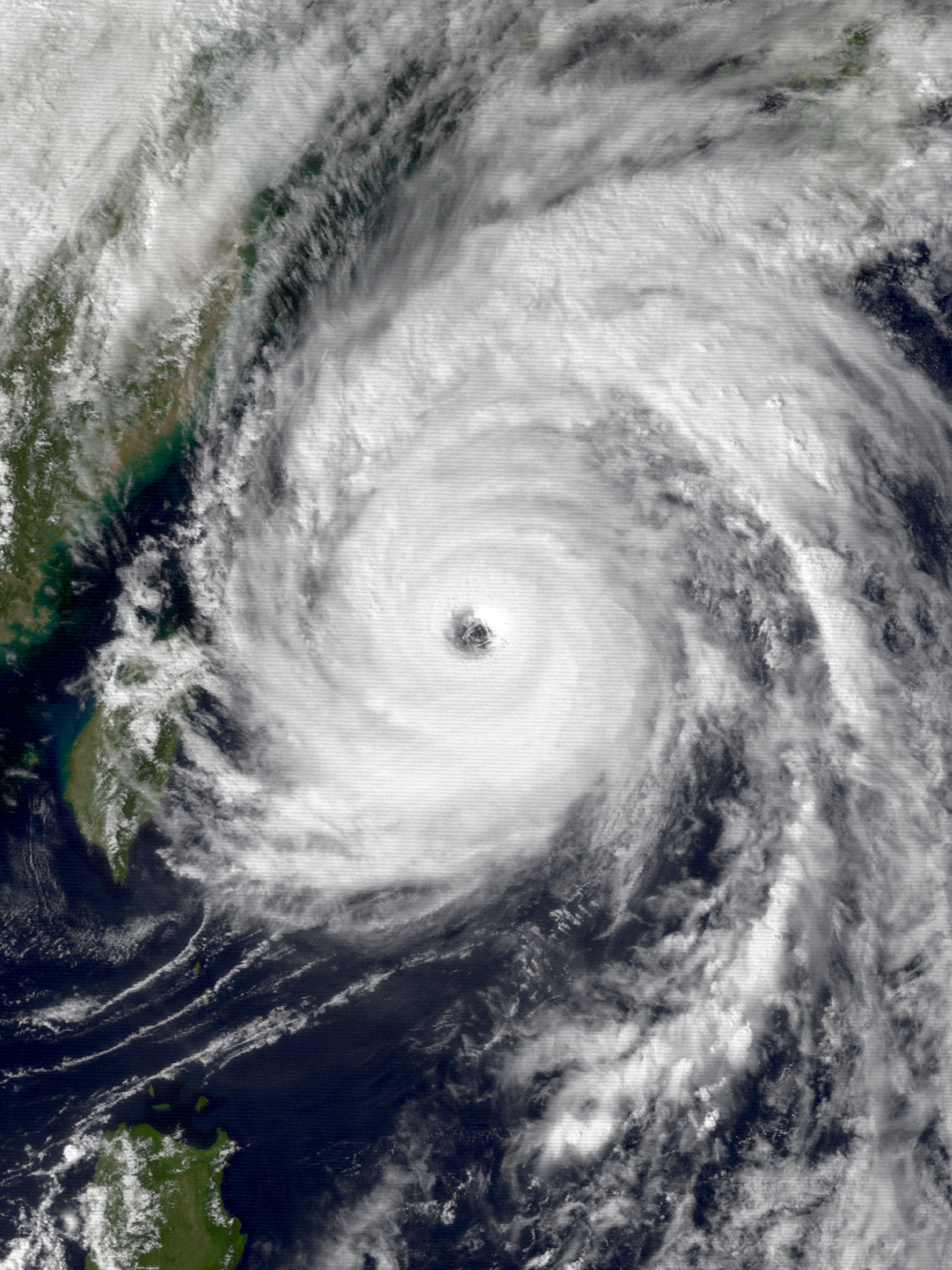
- Typhoon Mireille over the Ryukyu Islands on September 26

Meteorological history
- Formed: September 13, 1991
- Extratropical: September 28, 1991
- Dissipated: October 4, 1991

Very strong typhoon
- 10-minute sustained (JMA)
- Highest winds: 185 km/h (115 mph)
- Lowest pressure: 925 hPa (mbar); 27.32 inHg

Category 4-equivalent super typhoon
- 1-minute sustained (SSHWS/JTWC)
- Highest winds: 240 km/h (150 mph)
- Lowest pressure: 910 hPa (mbar); 26.87 inHg

Overall effects
- Fatalities: 68 total
- Damage: $10 billion (1991 USD) (Tied as sixth-costliest typhoon on record in nominal terms)
- Areas affected: Saipan, South Korea, Japan, Alaska
- IBTrACS
- Part of the 1991 Pacific typhoon season

Typhoon Mireille, named Rosing by PAGASA, was the costliest typhoon on record, until it was surpassed by Typhoon Doksuri in 2023. Striking Japan in September 1991, it became the 20th named storm of the 1991 Pacific typhoon season, Mireille formed on September 13 from the monsoon trough near the Marshall Islands. It moved westward for several days as a small system, steered by the subtropical ridge to the north. The storm rapidly intensified to typhoon status on September 16, and several days later passed north of Saipan in the Northern Marianas Islands. Mireille intensified further after deleterious effects from a nearby tropical storm subsided. On September 22, the American-based Joint Typhoon Warning Center (JTWC) estimated maximum 1-minute sustained winds of 240 km/h (150 mph), and on the next day, the official Japan Meteorological Agency (JMA) estimated 10‑minute sustained winds of 185 km/h (115 mph). The typhoon weakened slightly while turning northward, passing just east of Miyako-jima and later to the west of Okinawa. On September 27, Mireille made landfall near Nagasaki in southwestern Japan with winds of 175 km/h (109 mph), the strongest since Typhoon Nancy in 1961. The storm accelerated to the northeast through the Sea of Japan, moving over Hokkaido before becoming extratropical on September 28. The remnants of Mireille continued to the east, passing through the Aleutian Islands of Alaska on October 1.

The typhoon first threatened Guam, although it passed well to the north of the island, bringing damaging winds to northern Saipan. The first part of Japan affected was Miyako-jima, where heavy rainfall and high winds damaged crops. Mireille lashed Okinawa with strong waves, while strong winds up to 189 km/h (117 mph) damaged power lines and trees. The typhoon ultimately caused damage in 41 of 47 prefectures of Japan, with overall damage estimated at $10 billion (1991 USD, $22.5 billion in 2023), making it the costliest typhoon on record at the time. (Note: All damage totals are in 1991 values of their respective currencies.) Mireille produced record wind gusts at 26 locations, with a peak gust of 218 km/h (135 mph) in western Honshu. The winds caused record power outages across Japan that affected 7.36 million people, or about 13% of total customers. Mireille also left extensive crop damage totaling $3 billion, mostly to the apple industry, after 345,000 tons of apples fell to the ground and another 43,000 were damaged on the trees. The storm damaged over 670,000 houses, of which 1,058 were destroyed, and another 22,965 were flooded. Throughout Japan, Mireille killed 66 people and injured another 2,862 people, including ten deaths on a capsized freighter. Elsewhere, the typhoon killed two people in South Korea, and its remnants brought strong winds to Alaska.

== Meteorological history ==
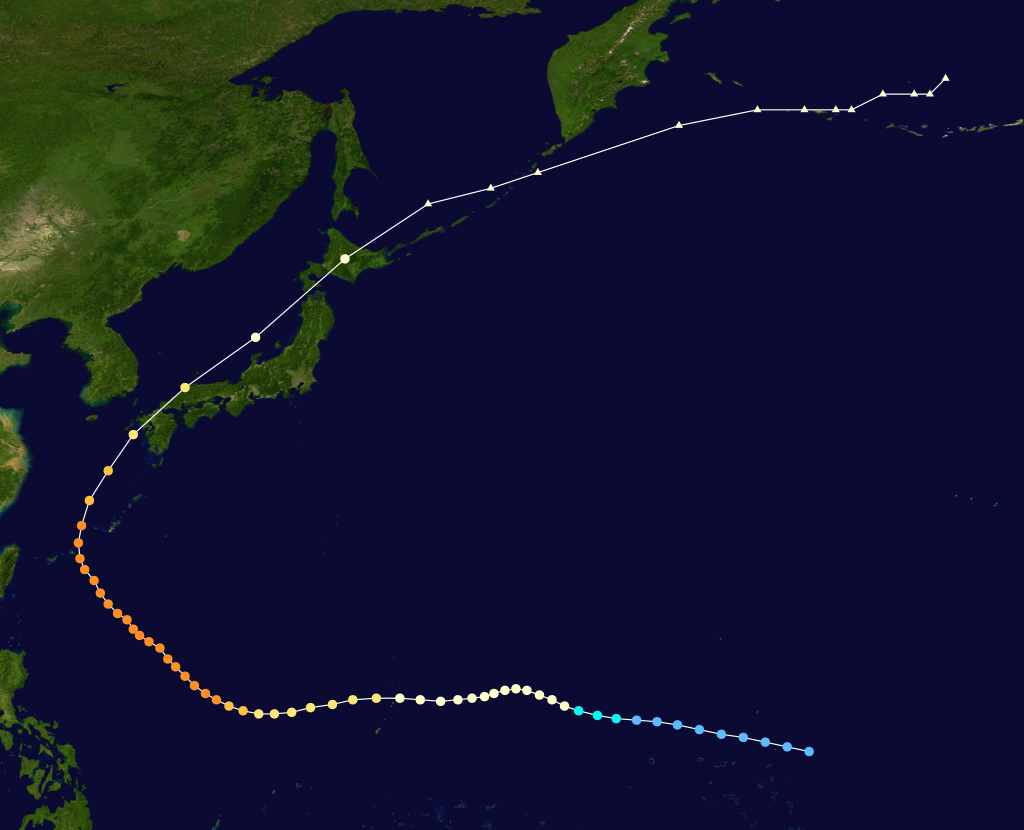
Map plotting the storm's track and intensity, according to the Saffir–Simpson scale Map key Saffir–Simpson scale Tropical depression (≤38 mph, ≤62 km/h) Tropical storm (39–73 mph, 63–118 km/h) Category 1 (74–95 mph, 119–153 km/h) Category 2 (96–110 mph, 154–177 km/h) Category 3 (111–129 mph, 178–208 km/h) Category 4 (130–156 mph, 209–251 km/h) Category 5 (≥157 mph, ≥252 km/h) Unknown Storm type Tropical cyclone Subtropical cyclone Extratropical cyclone, remnant low, tropical disturbance, or monsoon depression

The origins of Mireille were from a poorly-organized area of convection, or thunderstorms, associated with the monsoon trough near the Marshall Islands on September 13. That day, the Japan Meteorological Agency (JMA) (Note: The Japan Meteorological Agency is the official Regional Specialized Meteorological Center for the western Pacific Ocean.) began tracking the system as a tropical depression. The system moved westward, developing a large increase in thunderstorms over the center on September 15. That day, the Joint Typhoon Warning Center (JTWC) (Note: The Joint Typhoon Warning Center is a joint United States Navy – United States Air Force task force that issues tropical cyclone warnings for the western Pacific Ocean and other regions.) issued a tropical cyclone formation alert, and issued their first advisory on Tropical Depression 21W at 00:00 UTC, estimating 1-minute sustained winds of 55 km/h (34 mph). About six hours later, the agency upgraded the depression to Tropical Storm Mireille, after satellite imagery indicated the storm was very compact and intensifying quickly. The JTWC later determined in a post-storm analysis that Mireille had attained tropical storm status 12 hours earlier on the previous day. Also at the time of it attaining tropical storm status, Mireille was one of three storms in the basin, along with Tropical Storm Luke to the northwest and Typhoon Nat to the west in the South China Sea.

Only 12 hours after the JTWC issued the first warning, Mireille attained typhoon status at 12:00 UTC on September 16, and several hours later reached an initial peak intensity of 135 km/h (84 mph). The small storm moved west-northwestward due to the influence of the subtropical ridge to the north. On September 17, the track shifted to the west-southwest, threatening Guam. The small typhoon turned more to the west, passing about 20 km (12 mi) north of Saipan on September 19, part of the Northern Marianas Islands north of Guam. For several days, Mireille failed to intensify due to wind shear from the larger Tropical Storm Luke to the north. After Luke weakened and progressed northward, Mireille was able to strengthen more gradually, as well as increase in size. On September 22, the typhoon strengthened into a super typhoon, which is an unofficial category used by the JTWC for storms reaching 1‑minute winds of at least 240 km/h (150 mph), equivalent to a strong Category 4 hurricane on the SSHWS. According to the JMA, Mireille attained 10‑minute winds of 185 km/h (115 mph) on September 23.

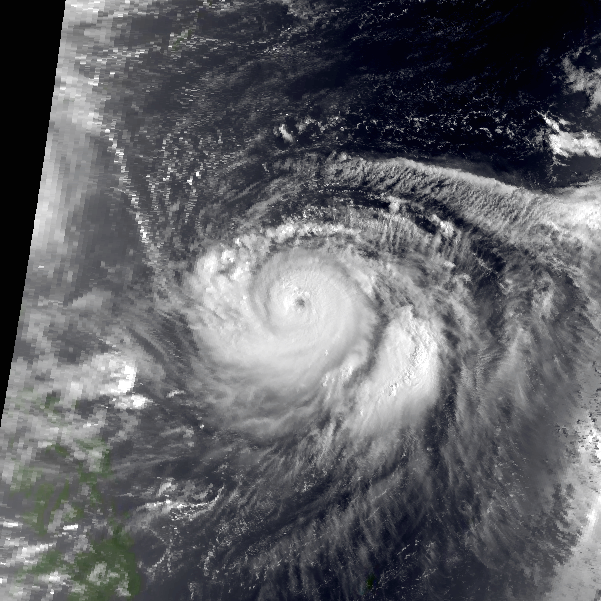
Mireille west of Guam on September 22 at peak intensity

Around the time of reaching peak intensity, Mireille turned more to the northwest along the southwestern periphery of the subtropical ridge. The increasing size began to impart wind shear in Typhoon Nat to the west, and the two storms underwent the Fujiwhara effect, in which Nat turned sharply southward while Mireille progressed toward the Ryukyu Islands of Japan. After maintaining peak winds for about 30 hours, Mireille began weakening, passing just east of Miyako-jima on September 26 with 10‑minute winds of 165 km/h (103 mph), according to the JMA. That day, the typhoon accelerated to the northeast due to increasing mid-level winds from the southwest, passing west of Okinawa. According to the JMA, Mireille re-intensified slightly on September 27 to a secondary peak of 175 km/h (109 mph), aided by unusually warm water temperatures in the East China Sea. The typhoon made landfall at that strength at 07:00 UTC between Saikai and Nagasaki along southwest Kyushu. The pressure at landfall was 940 mbar (28 inHg), the lowest in the country since Typhoon Trix in 1971.

The typhoon quickly weakened while continuing northeastward through Kyushu and western Honshu, and started to become an extratropical cyclone; during the process, the wind field expanded, aided by moist air from the southwest and cold air from the northwest. It accelerated further over the Sea of Japan, and late on September 27, Mireille made a second landfall in Japan along southwestern Hokkaido at 22:00 UTC, with 10‑minute winds of 150 km/h (93 mph) still at typhoon status. Crossing the island, the typhoon weakened to tropical storm status early on September 28, and shortly thereafter became fully extratropical in the Sea of Okhotsk. The powerful remnants of Mireille continued eastward, crossing the Aleutian Islands on September 29 and crossed the International Date Line shortly thereafter. That day, a pressure of 954 mbar (954 hPa; 28.2 inHg) was observed in the Pribilof Islands of Alaska. Powerful winds battered vessels in the region, with the Merchant Pride reporting peak sustained winds of 110 km/h (68 mph). After crossing the dateline, Mireille's remnants turned northeast and struck the Seward Peninsula on October 3 before moving over Arctic Alaska. The system then moved over the Arctic Ocean where it was last noted on October 4.

== Preparations and impact ==
Early tropical cyclone computer models anticipated Mireille would pass close to Guam, prompting officials to undergo preparations for the storm. The storm ultimately passed north of Saipan, causing damage along the island's northern portion. Mireille knocked over trees and damaged over 70% of Saipan's crops while also eroding coastal roads.

In South Korea, two people were killed with two others reported missing. A South Korean freighter rode out the storm at the port in Hakata Bay. It breached along the breakwater, causing it to sink, killing all 10 crew members. The Japan Coast Guard launched a search and rescue mission for two days.

Later, the remnants of Mireille moved through the Aleutian Islands toward the end of September, bringing strong winds to the islands, including gusts over 112 km/h (70 mph) at Amchitka.

=== Japan ===
Ahead of the storm, the JMA issued 99 typhoon bulletins, warning residents about Mireille. There were 236 warnings related to storm surge, high winds, waves, and flooding. In Hiroshima, most residents were aware of the approaching storm, about 70% of residents did not expect significant effects. In general, residents were unprepared for the storm, partly due to the lack of recent storms. Transportation in Japan was disrupted after 480 domestic flights cancelled, stranding 58,000 individuals, and road, rail, and ferry traffic was halted. In Hokkaido, 207 schools were closed due to the storm.

Mireille was the strongest typhoon to hit Japan since Typhoon Nancy in 1961, causing heavy damage in 41 of 47 prefectures. It was the third storm to strike Japan in two weeks. Damage was heaviest on Kyushu where the storm made landfall. Because the storm moved northeastward through the Sea of Japan, the eastern quadrant of the storm crossed over much of the country, which is where the strongest winds in tropical cyclones are located. The high winds downed trees, damaged roofs, and left record power outages, affecting 7.36 million people, or about 13% of total customers. In some areas, the power outages lasted as little as three minutes. The storm damaged over 670,000 houses, of which 1,058 were destroyed, and another 22,965 were flooded. Power outages caused at least five factories to shut down production. Along the coast, the typhoon damaged 930 ships, with dozens sunk or blown ashore. Most of the damage was related to agriculture or forests. Sea spray heavily damaged fruit trees and rice paddies. Crop damage amounted to $3 billion, mostly to the apple industry, after 345,000 tons of apples fell to the ground and another 43,000 were damaged on the trees. Most farms lost 80% of their crop, potentially taking 10 years to regrow. Persistent cloudiness and rainfall following the storm diminished sunlight by 50%, furthering crop damage. There were 62 deaths in Japan and 2,862 injuries, including the deaths on the South Korean freighter, making it the deadliest typhoon there in 10 years. About 80% of the deaths were male, and 70% were over 60 years old. Most of the deaths were related to wind-blown debris, falling due to the wind, or being trapped or struck by fallen objects. The $6 billion in insured losses and $10 billion in overall damage made Mireille the costliest typhoon on record as of January 2015, according to Munich Re.

When Mireille moved through western Japan, it brought strong winds and heavy rainfall. The highest sustained wind was 162 km/h (101 mph) at Nomozaki, Nagasaki, and gusts nearby peaked at 218 km/h (135 mph). Misawa Air Base along northern Honshu reported winds of at least 93 km/h (58 mph) for five hours, with a peak gust of 152 km/h (94 mph). This was the highest wind report at the station since records began in 1946. The strongest wind gusts occurred concurrently with a sudden drop in atmospheric pressure, primarily from Kyushu and extending east-northeastward into the Chūgoku region of Honshu. Mireille produced record wind gusts at 26 locations and record sustained winds at 12 locations. At landfall, Mireille produced winds of at least 54 km/h (34 mph) across a diameter of 600 km (370 mi). About two-thirds of the wind stations reported the strongest winds from the west after Mireille passed the area. Winds were lightest in eastern Honshu, Mireille also dropped heavy rainfall, mostly on Shikoku, peaking at 406 mm (16.0 in) at Kito, Tokushima. In nearby Kōchi Prefecture, the heaviest hourly rainfall total was 72 mm (2.8 in), the highest in the nation for the storm. The rains caused at least 13 landslides and flooded rivers in four locations. However, effects from rainfall were limited due to the storm's fast forward motion. Mireille also struck around the time of high tide, causing extensive storm surge along the coast.

Mireille first passed near Miyako-jima, dropping 273 mm (10.7 in) of rainfall there. Wind gusts on the island reached 176 km/h (109 mph), which caused some crop damage to sugar cane and vegetables. All flights were canceled as Mireille passed the island. Later, the typhoon bypassed Okinawa to the west. The island experienced winds of at least 93 km/h (58 mph) for 27 hours, with gusts of 152 km/h (94 mph) at Kadena Air Base. The capital city, Naha, reported gusts of 180 km/h (110 mph), while the highest gust in the region was 189 km/h (117 mph) on Kume Island. Mireille produced heavy rainfall on Okinawa, totaling 258 mm (10.2 in), which allowed water restrictions there to be lifted for the rest of the year. The precipitation fell in a short amount of time; 11 mm (0.43 in) dropped in just 10 minutes, and 34 mm (1.3 in) dropped in an hour, both at Naha. Waves reached 13.7 m (45 ft) along the coast of Okinawa. On Kume Island, the combination of high waves and tides produced damaging storm surge. The storm flooded 74 houses and damaged another 37. Mireille damaged roads in two locations, while winds damaged 157 power lines, which cut communications to 3,123 people. The storm also left heavy damage to the agriculture and forest industries. In the region, Mireille caused 44 flights to be canceled. Two people were injured on Okinawa, and overall damage in the prefecture totaled ¥1.5 billion (US$11.4 million). (Note: The total was originally reported in Japanese yen. Total converted via the Oanda Corporation website.)

In Kyushu, the heavy rainfall caused flooding and landslides, which buried several houses in Miyazaki Prefecture and forced 75 people to evacuate. The high wind knocked over many cypress or cedar trees, totaling 22,529 hectares (55,670 acres) and accounting for ¥64 billion (US$530 million) in damage in Ōita Prefecture alone. Damage was heaviest near Nagasaki, where 16 people were killed, including five after a warehouse collapsed during the storm. A construction worker in nearby Isahaya was killed when the winds struck him with a prebuilt hut, and airborne debris killed five people in Kumamoto Prefecture and seven in Fukuoka Prefecture. Throughout Kyushu, about 2 million people lost power. High winds and waves in Kagoshima Prefecture overturned several cars, killing one person in Ōshima. Throughout Kyushu, about 2 million people lost power. On nearby Shikoku island, high winds and rains caused ¥4.7 billion (US$35.7 million) in damage in Tokushima, mostly related to fisheries, crops, and houses. A record storm surge, in conjunction with high winds, damaged a school in Sakaide, as well as a floating pier and coastal road in nearby Ehime Prefecture. Rough surf swept away a woman in Matsuyama.

Costliest known Pacific typhoons (adjusted for inflation)
Rank	Typhoon	Season	Damage (2025 USD)
1	4 Doksuri	2023	$30.1 billion
2	4 Mireille	1991	$23.6 billion
3	5 Hagibis	2019	$21.8 billion
4	5 Saomai	2000	$17.3 billion
5	5 Jebi	2018	$16.7 billion
6	4 Songda	2004	$15.9 billion
7	5 Yagi	2024	$15.1 billion
8	2 Fitow	2013	$14.4 billion
9	4 Faxai	2019	$12.6 billion
10	4 Tokage	2004	$12.1 billion

The storm track brought Mireille west of the most populated island of Honshu, limiting damage there compared to Kyushu. At Misawa Air Base, the strong winds knocked over trees and blew off the roofs of several warehouses, and also knocked off storage sheds off their foundation. Ahead of the storm, advance warning allowed the American military to shelter aircraft and warn the population. Damage was estimated between $500,000–$1.5 million. Two of Mazda's loading docks in Hiroshima were completely destroyed, affecting American inventories of 1992 Mazda 929's until the end of November 1991. Also in the city, 1.1 million residents, or 80% of households, lost power due to winds and storm surge. In Yamaguchi Prefecture, the Takeda Pharmaceutical Company was flooded with 0.6 m (2.0 ft) of waters, forcing workers to move to another plant in the United States. The strong winds and waves damaged the Itsukushima Shrine near Hiroshima and Kenroku-en northwest of Tokyo. In Okayama Prefecture, salt spray damaged railways and shut down lines for three days. High winds in Naka-ku collapsed scaffolding from a parking garage, and another damaged scaffolding nearby forced a road to shut down. There were extensive crop losses in northern Honshu. In Toyama Prefecture, the winds destroyed 192 greenhouses and exasperated a fire that caused further crop damage.

Striking Hokkaido with much of its former intensity, Mireille produced strong winds across the island. Hakodate Airport reported a peak gust of 124 km/h (77 mph), and the highest sustained wind was 79 km/h (49 mph) in Urakawa. Along the coast, waves reached 7.7 m (25 ft) high at Matsumae, killing one person in Kushiro who was mooring his boat. Light rains occurred on the island, reaching 75 mm (3.0 in) in Hidaka. In Hakodate, the storm damaged five buildings, and about 3,000 houses lost power. There was scattered roof damage across Hokkaido, and flying glass injured one person.

== Aftermath ==
By a day after the storm made landfall, the record power outages were largely restored. However, salt damage prevented restoration in some areas for several days. The outages left residents temporarily without water after water pumps were shut down. In Hiroshima, lack of power caused traffic congestion, shut down banks, and disrupted hospitals. The widespread power outages related to Mireille prompted the government to reconstruct transmission towers with anemometer, or wind measurement devices. Following the storm, insurance companies paid $6 billion to policy holders in Japan, which was a world record related to wind damage; this was surpassed less than a year later by Hurricane Andrew striking Florida. The typhoon was the costliest non-Atlantic hurricane, adjusted for inflation, until 2023, when both Typhoon Doksuri and Storm Daniel surpassed Mireille's total damage costs.

Due to the severity of damage and loss of life caused by the storm, the name Mireille was retired and replaced with Melissa.

== See also ==
- Tropical cyclones in 1991
- Other tropical cyclones named Rosing
- List of Alaska tropical cyclones
- Typhoon Sarah (1959) – Similarly powerful typhoon that also recurved near South Korea and Japan
- Typhoon Chaba (2004) – Typhoon that moved northeastward through Japan

== Notes ==
Preceded by Bess	Costliest Pacific typhoons on record (nominal); 1991	Succeeded by Hagibis
