= Typhoon Saomai (2000) =

Pacific typhoon in 2000

Typhoon Saomai (Osang)
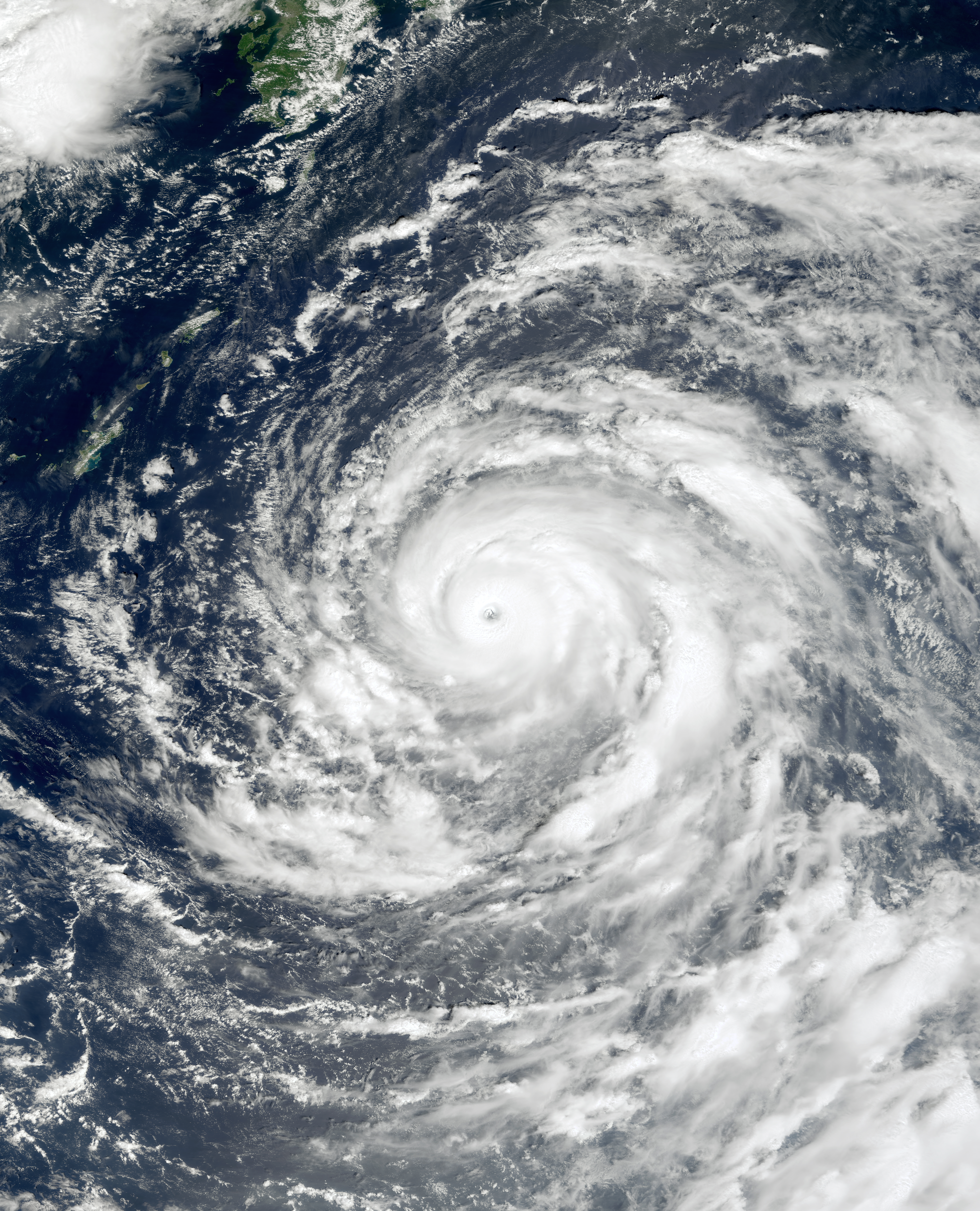
- Saomai near peak intensity on September 10

Meteorological history
- Formed: August 31, 2000
- Extratropical: September 16, 2000
- Dissipated: September 19, 2000

Very strong typhoon
- 10-minute sustained (JMA)
- Highest winds: 175 km/h (110 mph)
- Lowest pressure: 925 hPa (mbar); 27.32 inHg

Category 5-equivalent super typhoon
- 1-minute sustained (SSHWS/JTWC)
- Highest winds: 260 km/h (160 mph)
- Lowest pressure: 898 hPa (mbar); 26.52 inHg

Overall effects
- Fatalities: >28
- Damage: $9.24 billion (2000 USD)
- Areas affected: Mariana Islands; Japan; China; Korea; Russia
- IBTrACS
- Part of the 2000 Pacific typhoon season

Typhoon Saomai, (Note: The name Saomai (Vietnamese: sao Mai, [saːw˧˧ maːj˧˧]) was contributed by Vietnam and means Venus in Vietnamese.) known in the Philippines as Super Typhoon Osang, was a long-tracked and intense tropical cyclone that brought flooding rainfall in Japan and the Korean Peninsula in early September 2000. The torrential precipitation in Japan was considered some of the worst in the past century.

Saomai, the second strongest typhoon in the western Pacific in 2000, developed from an area of disturbed weather in open sea on August 31. The system was initially quick to intensify, reaching an initial peak intensity as a typhoon on September 4. Wind shear caused a hiatus in Saomai's strengthening phase, and as a result Saomai weakened back to a tropical storm as it tracked northwest for the next few days. On September 9, the system regained typhoon intensity and began to rapidly intensify, reaching peak intensity on September 10 with maximum sustained winds of 175 km/h (109 mph). (Note: All measurements and estimates of maximum sustained wind are sustained over a ten-minute period unless otherwise noted.) Over the ensuing two days Saomai would weaken slightly before making landfall on Okinawa Island. The typhoon later entered the East China Sea, where it recurved towards the northeast before making landfall on South Korea as a severe tropical storm, later transitioning into an extratropical cyclone on September 16. Saomai's remnants would move into Russia before dissipating three days later.

As a developing typhoon, the outer rainbands of Saomai affected the Mariana Islands, causing moderate damage. Localized power outages were reported, and damage totaled to US$650,000. (Note: All monetary values are in their respective currency's worth in 2000.) Even before Saomai made landfall on Okinawa, the typhoon caused rough seas off the coast of Japan that resulted in several shipping incidents. Concurrently, the approach of a front into the country interacted with the typhoon, resulting in unprecedented rainfalls in Japan. Due to the floods, approximately 400,000 people were evacuated in three prefectures. In Nagoya, observed rainfall totals were the highest since records began in 1891. Several landslides and strong winds were reported. Overall, damage in Japan and its outlying islands totaled JP¥978 billion (US$9 billion) and eleven fatalities were reported. As Saomai tracked near China, its outer rainbands and strong waves prompted the evacuation of 20,000 people and caused record high stream heights.

In South Korea, eight people were killed and damage figures equated to US$242 million. Widespread power outages took a toll on as many as 422,000 homes and heavy rains flooded numerous fields of crops. Minor damage occurred in North Korea, though the damage wrought by Typhoon Prapiroon earlier in the month was exacerbated by Saomai's impacts. In Russia, where the typhoon made landfall as an extratropical storm, nine people were killed due to car accidents spurred by rainfall caused by the Saomai. Overall, Saomai's effects resulted in the death of 28 people and roughly US$9.24 billion in damage.

== Meteorological history ==
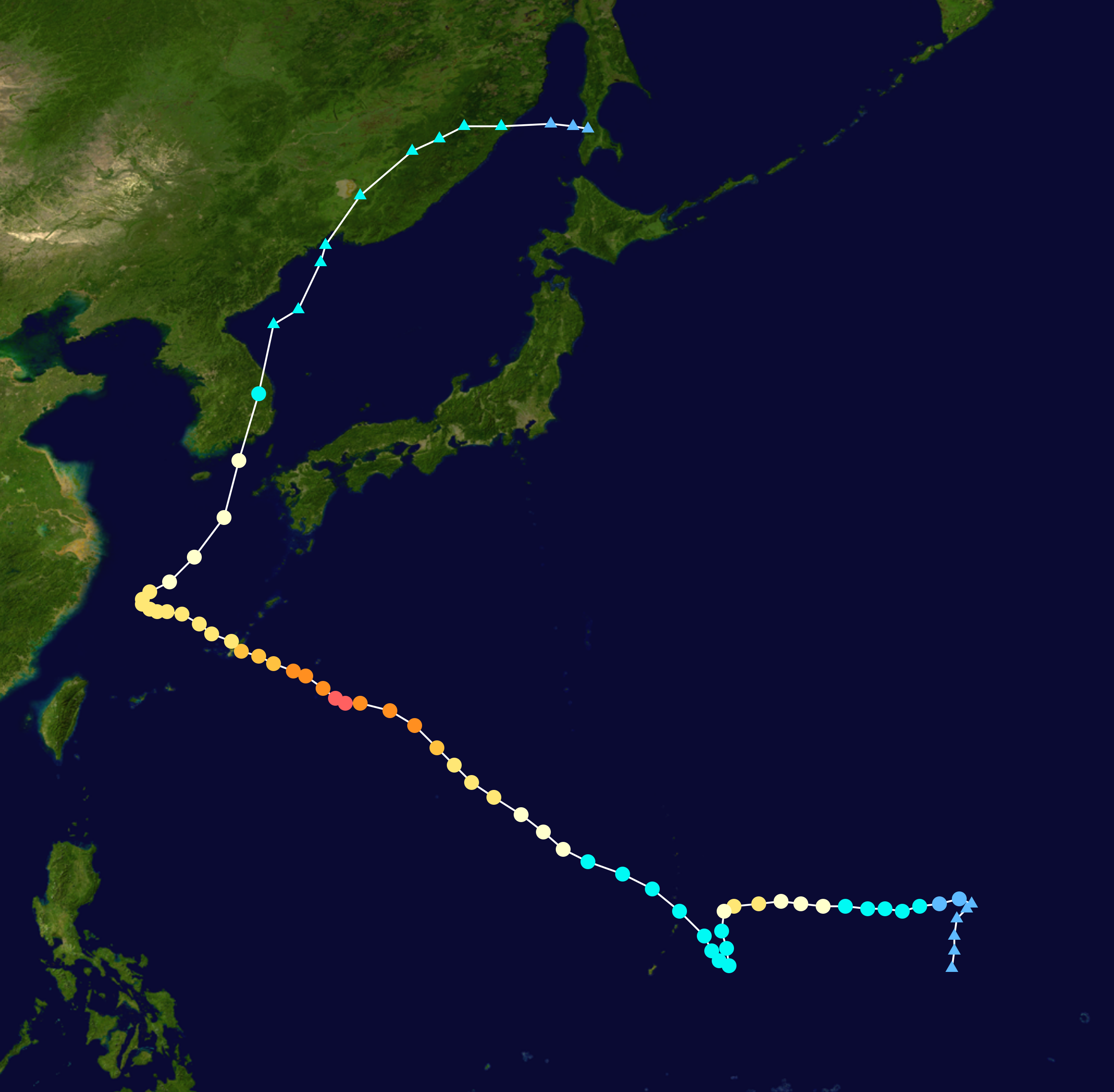
Map plotting the storm's track and intensity, according to the Saffir–Simpson scale Map key Saffir–Simpson scale Tropical depression (≤38 mph, ≤62 km/h) Tropical storm (39–73 mph, 63–118 km/h) Category 1 (74–95 mph, 119–153 km/h) Category 2 (96–110 mph, 154–177 km/h) Category 3 (111–129 mph, 178–208 km/h) Category 4 (130–156 mph, 209–251 km/h) Category 5 (≥157 mph, ≥252 km/h) Unknown Storm type Tropical cyclone Subtropical cyclone Extratropical cyclone, remnant low, tropical disturbance, or monsoon depression

Typhoon Saomai emerged from an area of convection that developed well east of Guam in late-August. Though the disturbance was associated with a low-pressure area, the circulation center was too weak to support persistent shower activity. Despite the satellite presentation, the Japan Meteorological Agency (JMA) classified the system as a tropical depression at 1800 UTC on August 31. Over the next few days, the system organized and curved towards the west from its initial northerly track. At 1200 UTC on September 2, the JMA upgraded the small depression to tropical storm intensity. Within Saomai, convection deepened near the center, signifying continued intensification. A cold central dense overcast eventually developed, and at 1200 UTC the next day, Saomai became a severe tropical storm. Early on September 4, the tropical cyclone intensified further into a typhoon. At the time, Saomai was still well northeast of Guam.

Upon reaching typhoon strength, Saomai attained an initial peak intensity with maximum sustained winds of 120 km/h (75 mph). Shortly after, despite the fact that a primitive eye had begun to develop, wind shear increased, shearing the storm's convection away. As a result, the JMA downgraded Saomai below typhoon strength on September 5, and at roughly the same time a subtropical ridge to the storm's southeast steered Saomai southward. This break in the storm's westerly course was short lived, and early on September 6, Saomai assumed its previous heading. Over time the shearing conditions gradually abated, and rainbanding about the cyclone was showing signs of organization and strengthening. On September 8, Saomai finally re-developed a central dense overcast, prompting the JMA to upgrade the tropical storm back to typhoon intensity at 0000 UTC the following day. Back in favorable conditions, the typhoon entered a phase of rapid intensification beginning six hours later. During this period a well-defined eye developed, and the storm's eyewall significantly intensified. At 1200 UTC on September 10, Saomai reached its peak intensity with sustained winds estimated at 175 km/h (109 mph) and a minimum barometric pressure of 925 mbar (hPa; 27.32 inHg). The intense typhoon held this intensity for approximately nine hours before it began to weaken.

Following peak intensity, Saomai's eye became cloud-filled, and the storm began to develop concentric eyewalls. Shortly after 1000 UTC on September 12, the typhoon made landfall on central Okinawa, Japan with sustained winds of 140 km/h (87 mph) and a pressure of 945 mbar (945 hPa; 27.9 inHg). Saomai quickly passed over the island, and concurrently its weakening phase came to a halt. After tracking into the East China Sea, the typhoon began to track towards the northeast in response to a mid-latitude trough. At its westernmost point along its track, Saomai was located approximately 345 km (214 mi) east of Wenzhou, China. Atmospheric conditions became increasingly more hostile as Saomai tracked northeast, and the typhoon became elongated and ragged in appearance. At 1200 UTC on September 15, Saomai was downgraded to severe tropical storm intensity as the cyclone began to undergo extratropical transition. At around 2030 UTC that day, Saomai made its final landfall as a tropical system west of Pusan, South Korea; after emerging into the Yellow Sea the storm was declared extratropical at 0600 UTC the next day. These remnants later tracked inland near Vladivostok, Russia before dissipating on September 19.

== Preparations, impact, and aftermath ==
Costliest known Pacific typhoons (adjusted for inflation)
Rank	Typhoon	Season	Damage (2025 USD)
1	4 Doksuri	2023	$30.1 billion
2	4 Mireille	1991	$23.6 billion
3	5 Hagibis	2019	$21.8 billion
4	5 Saomai	2000	$17.3 billion
5	5 Jebi	2018	$16.7 billion
6	4 Songda	2004	$15.9 billion
7	5 Yagi	2024	$15.1 billion
8	2 Fitow	2013	$14.4 billion
9	4 Faxai	2019	$12.6 billion
10	4 Tokage	2004	$12.1 billion

=== Northern Mariana Islands and Guam ===
Early in Saomai's developmental history, the rainbands associated with the storm dropped heavy rain across the Northern Mariana Islands. Schools across the archipelago nation were closed, and ferry service between Saipan and Tinian was cancelled. Reports of flooding were widespread, including in Saipan. In Tianan, some banana trees were damaged by the storm's affects. Damage from the islands amounted to US$650,000, with $600,000 to infrastructure.

The presence of the nearby tropical cyclone caused the delaying of two flights and the cancellation of another at Antonio B. Won Pat International Airport. On Guam, the United States Navy ordered the release of ships from the local harbor. There, peaked at 251 mm (9.9 in) over a 24-hour period at Piti. At the National Weather Service office in Tiyan, a gauge observed 100 mm (3.9 in) of rain. Gusty winds were also associated with Saomai's outer rainbands, with gusts peaking at a measured 105 km/h (65 mph) on September 4. The winds caused power outage in localized areas and downed two telephone poles. Severe flooding occurred in Merizo after a storm drain became clogged with debris, inundating six houses.

=== Japan ===
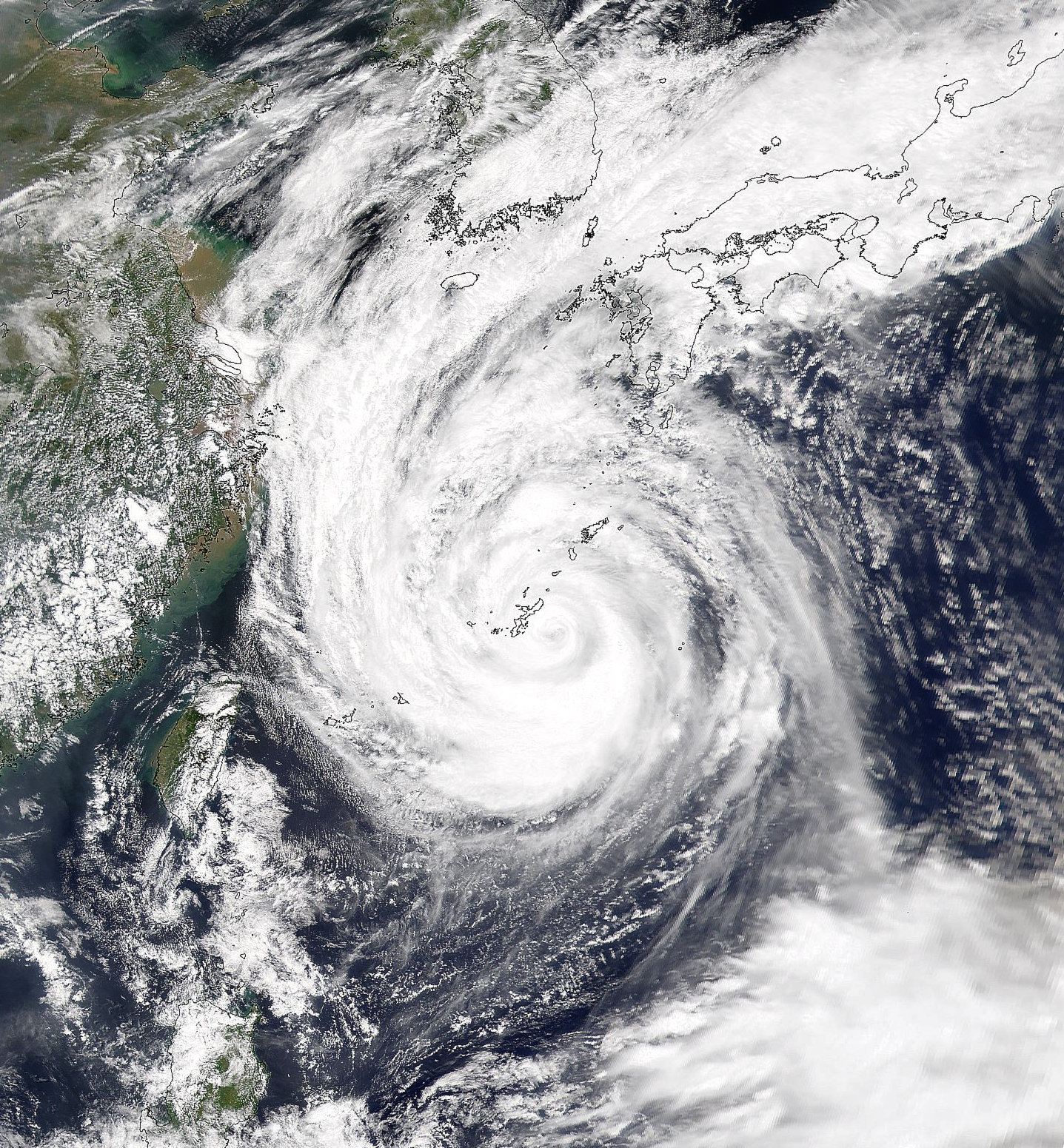
Typhoon Saomai nearing Okinawa on September 12

On September 10, rough seas caused by Saomai capsized a fishing boat off of Shizuoka Prefecture, causing one person to go missing. Another occupant of the boat was rescued three hours after the sinking by police helicopter. The waves also caused a dozen containers from the South Korean Heunga Nagoya to fall into the sea 5.5 km (3.4 mi) off the coast of Susami and Wakayama Prefecture. Off of Oita Prefecture, the waves were the impetus for red tides, resulting in significant marine loss. The approach of the typhoon towards Okinawa coincided with the approach of a weather front over mainland Japan, resulting in prolonged rainfall over the mainland. The rains caused extensive flooding, prompting the Cabinet of Japan to make reassurances in the repair of the ensuing damage. Rail service along the Tōkaidō Shinkansen between Tokyo and Osaka was suspended for more than 18 hours at one point, the longest delay to be enforced in the rail's service history. As a result, 50,000 passengers were forced to wait out the storm in the line's stopped trains. Toyota closed 24 of its manufacturing plants, resulting in the incompletion of 10,000 vehicles. Similarly, Mitsubishi stopped production at two of its facilities in Nagoya. Japan Airlines, All Nippon Airways, and Japan Air System cancelled a combined 114 flights, which adversely affected about 21,000 people.

Across the country, rainfall peaked at 1,000 mm (39 in) in Miyagawa, Mie; the same station also recorded 522 mm (20.6 in) of rain in a single 24-hour period. As a result of the flooding in Mie, 2,819 homes were inundated and 25 landslides occurred. Several buildings succumbed to the water and thus collapsed. Extensive power outage occurred in Kagoshima Prefecture, affecting approximately 4,500 households. In addition, the heavy rains caused damage to agriculture, including sugar cane crops. Damage in the prefecture totaled JP¥356 million (US$3.27 million). Similar effects were felt across Kyushu. Several flights into Nagasaki Prefecture were cancelled; the rains there also caused agricultural damage totaling JP¥99 million (US$910,000). Flooding also occurred on Shikoku, where rainfall totals peaked at 976 mm (38.4 in) in Funato, Kōchi. Severe damage occurred elsewhere in Kōchi, where combined forestry and agricultural damage figures reached JP¥2.08 billion (US$19.1 million). In Tokushima Prefecture, several landslides occurred, disrupting transportation routes.

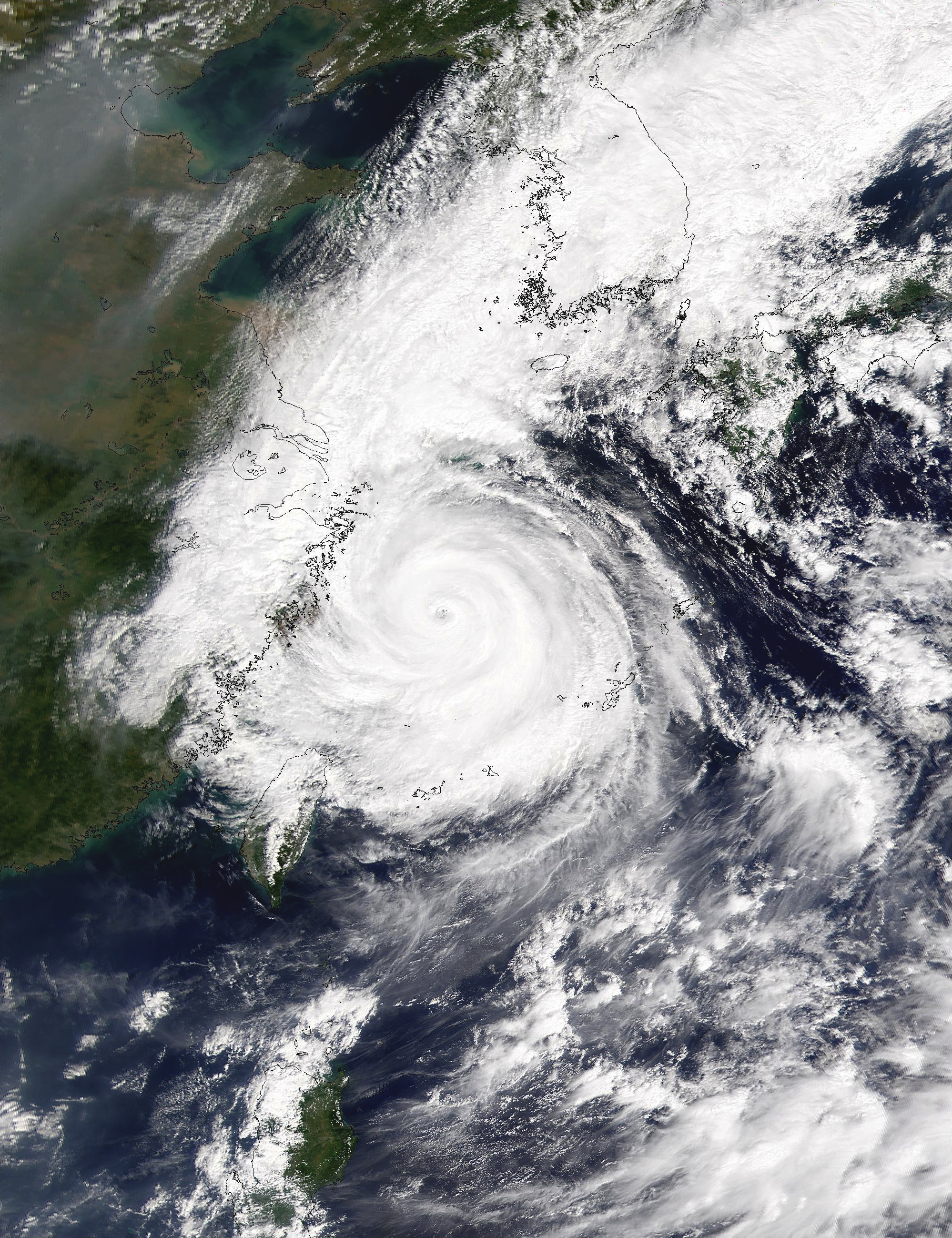
Typhoon Saomai in the East China Sea on September 14

Record rainfall was observed in Aichi Prefecture, with 511 mm (20.1 in) of rain in Tokai and 532 mm (20.9 in) of rain in Nagoya in a span of a single day; both observations were the highest since records began in 1891. Due to the threat of landslides in Nagoya, the municipal government ordered the evacuation of 140,000 families. In the ward of Nakagawa-ku, two rivers overflowed their banks and over-topped the surrounding embankment. Two tornadoes occurred in the prefecture, with one striking Mihama and another striking Minamichita; the former tornado injured 22 people, of which two were hospitalized. Another 41,000 families encompassing 400,000 people were evacuated across Aichi, Gifu, and Mie prefectures as a precautionary measure.

Damage in Okinawa, the site of Saomai's first landfall, was considerable but not unprecedented. On September 10, the provincial government established a disaster warning headquarters on Daito Island to more efficiently deal with the typhoon's effects. Rainfall peaked on Mount Yonaha, where a station recorded 537 mm (21.1 in) of rain. During the storm, 31 roads sustained damage and 26 landslides occurred. Damage in Okinawa Prefecture reached JP¥636 million (US$5.83 million). Overall, Saomai caused the destruction of 609 homes and the inundation of 70,017 others in Japan. Eleven people were killed and 103 others suffered injury. The cost within the country totaled JP¥978 billion (US$9 billion). At the height of the storm, over 17,000 people had been displaced in emergency shelters.

=== Korean peninsula ===
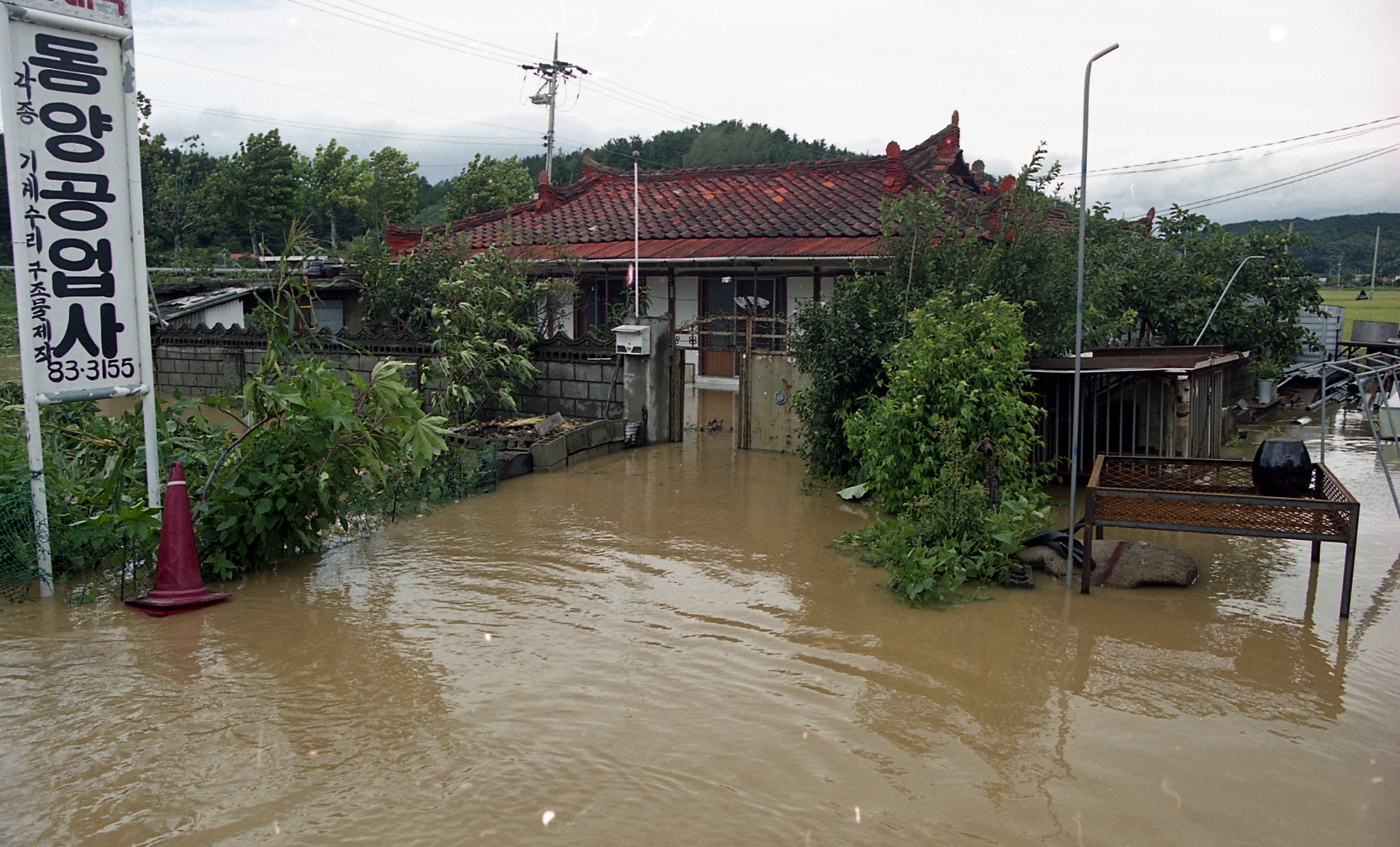
Damage at Uljin

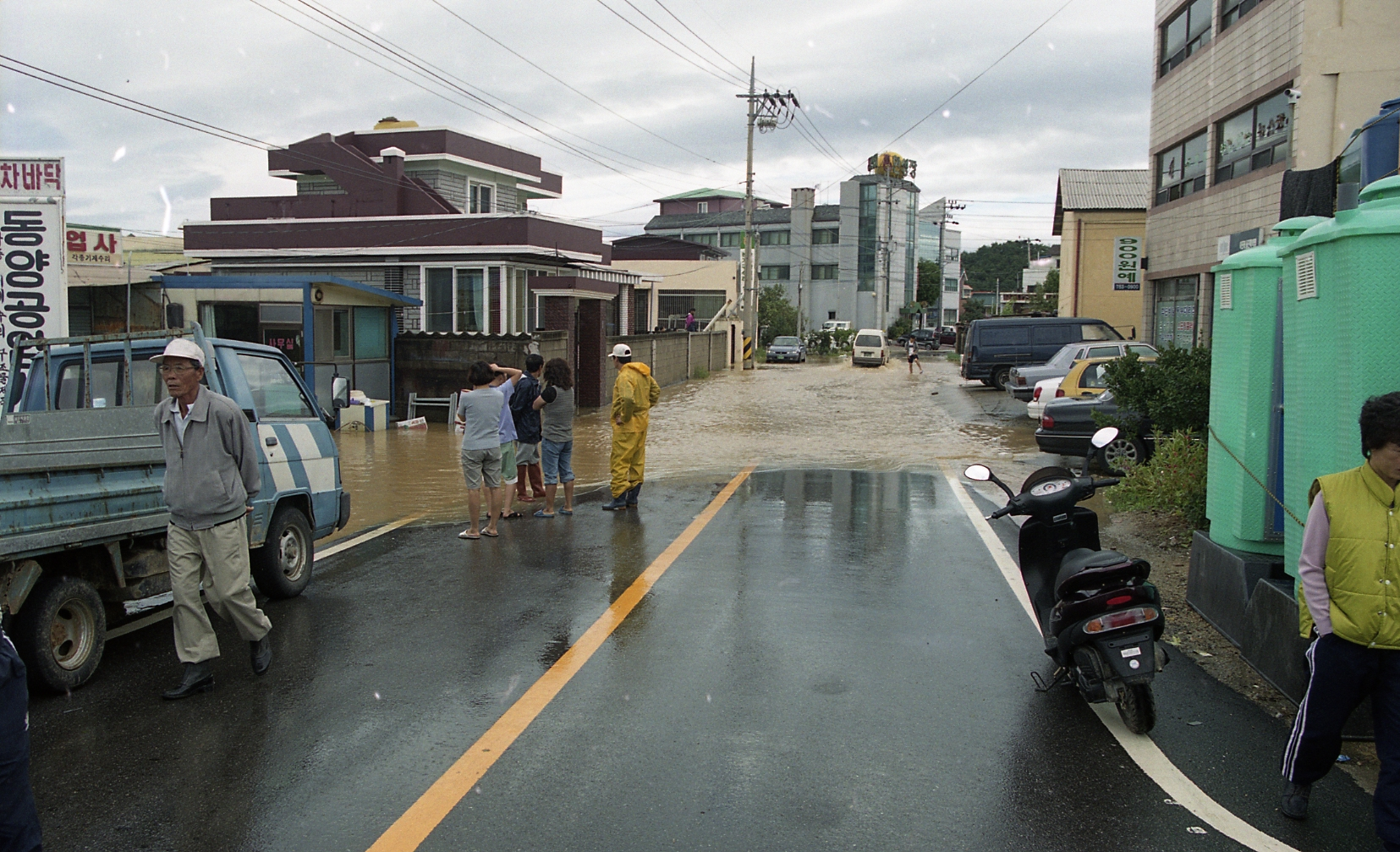
Damage at Uljin

As Saomai approached South Korea, the typhoon forced the cancellation of flights beginning on September 12. Four airports had their air service suspended. Other suspensions of transportation included the refuge of 362 fishing boats in ports and the closure of 10 national parks and 43 mountain paths. As a result, about 16,600 campers and hikers were evacuated to safer areas. As a result of the inclement weather, the operation of 149 passenger ships were cancelled. On September 13, the Korea Meteorological Administration (KMA) issued a typhoon warning for waters south of South Korea and Jeju Province. The administration anticipated heavy rainfall, though not as much as what had taken place in Japan. Offshore, an Indonesian freighter with 39 crewmen became stranded by the typhoon in waters south of Pusan. The crew were rescued by maritime police, but 270 tons of oil spilled into the ocean from a broken oil container.

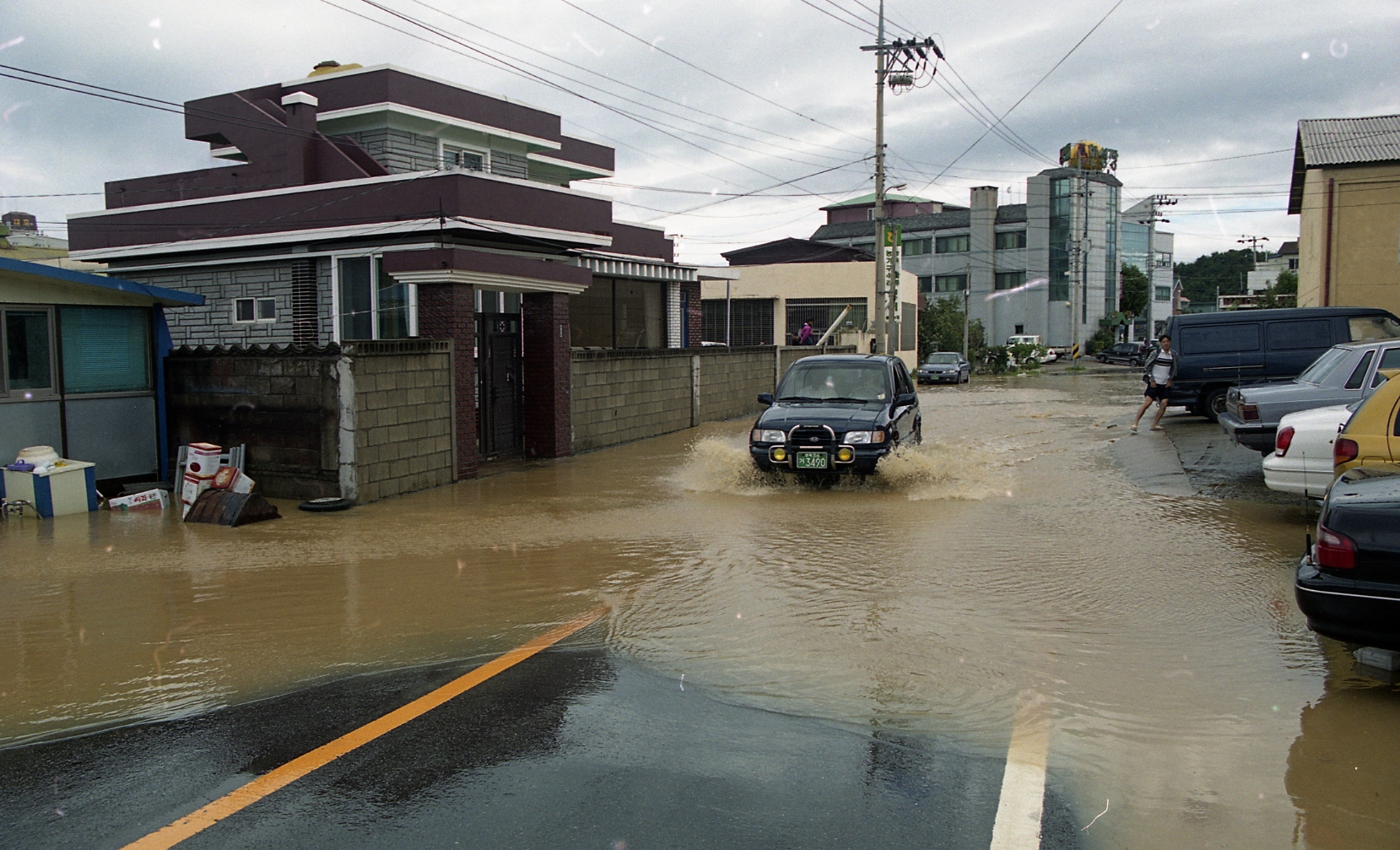
Damage at Uljin

In South Korea, the northern and southern Gyeongsang provinces were the most heavily impacted. At least 6,000 hectares (15,000 acres) of paddy fields were flooded. Heavy rains caused the Nakdong River to breach a section of embankment, prompting the evacuation of 100 families. Flood warnings were issued by the KMA on sections of the river for the first time in 2000. In South Gyeongsang, an electricity pylon collapsed, cutting power supply to about 700 houses. Strong winds uprooted trees and destroyed homes and fishing boats in Pusan. Countrywide, losses were initially estimated at KR₩20 billion (US$17.8 million), though these figures later rose to KR₩138.4 billion (US$124 million). (Note: This figure was originally reported in United States dollars.) As a result of Saomai, eight people were killed, and 411 others were displaced. More than 600 buildings were either inundated or destroyed entirely. At the height of the storm, roughly 422,000 households were without power, primarily in northern and southern Gyeongsang provinces. Total damage was finalized at KR₩270 billion (US$242 million).

Relatively minor damage occurred in North Korea, previously impacted by Typhoon Prapiroon earlier in September. Rainfall peaked at 147 mm (5.8 in) in Kaesong. Saomai somewhat exacerbated the unprecedented damage caused by Prapiroon, and damaged maize crops which were set to be harvested in the coming weeks.

=== Elsewhere ===
At its closest approach to China, Saomai generated high waves that coincided with high tide, resulting in extensive damage. In preparation for the storm, schools in Ningbo were forced to close, and ferry service was discontinued. Over 20,000 people were evacuated by the Chinese government onto higher land. The most severely affected Chinese province was Zhejiang. A station in Dinghai District observed 102 mm (4.0 in) of rain in 18 hours, equivalent to more than half of that station's monthly average. In Zhoushan, 20,000 hectares of farmland were inundated and 2,500 homes collapsed. Off the island, ten fishing boats collided, and another oil tanker capsized. Areas in Gaoting were submerged under as much as 1 m (3.3 ft) of water. Off the coast, 225 boats and 130 piers were damaged. In Shanghai, 20 streets were flooded and hundreds of homes were flooded with water. At nearby Hongqiao Airport, an Airbus A340 bound for Paris slipped off the runway. Though no people were injured, the airport was closed for eight hours. The typhoon also caused the Huangpu River to rise to its third highest level in recorded history.

Despite being a much weaker storm upon impacting Russia, Saomai's rains flooded coal retrieval sites, cutting down on electric power supplies in Primorsky Krai. Due to the shortages, electric power was transferred there from other surrounding areas. Furthermore, a 50 percent decrease in electricity output was documented at the local power station in Luchegorsk. To the south, an overflowing of the Kazachka River prompted the evacuation of over 60 people. Overall, 55 automobile accidents occurred in eastern Russia, leading to nine fatalities and 76 people injured.

== See also ==
- Tropical cyclones in 2000
- Typhoon Rusa (2002)
- Typhoon Maemi (2003)
- Typhoon Nari (2007)
- Typhoon Hinnamnor (2022)
- Typhoon Khanun (2023)
