= List of storms named Butchoy =

The name Butchoy has been used for six tropical cyclones in the Philippine Area of Responsibility by PAGASA in the Western Pacific Ocean.

- Tropical Depression 02W (2004) (02W, Butchoy) – approached the Philippines.
- Typhoon Rammasun (2008) (T0802, 03W, Butchoy) – remained at sea.
- Typhoon Guchol (2012) (T1204, 05W, Butchoy) – a powerful typhoon that made landfall over Honshu, Japan.
- Typhoon Nepartak (2016) (T1601, 02W, Butchoy) – a very intense storm which impacted Taiwan and devastated East China
- Tropical Storm Nuri (2020) (T2002, 02W, Butchoy) – prompted PAGASA the storm to start the rainy season after it hit the Philippines.
- Severe Tropical Storm Prapiroon (2024) (T2404, 04W, Butchoy) – a severe tropical storm that traversed Hainan and Vietnam.

Preceded by Amuyao	Philippine typhoon names Butchoy	Succeeded by Carina
