= Typhoon Hagupit (2020) =

Pacific typhoon in 2020

Typhoon Hagupit (Dindo)
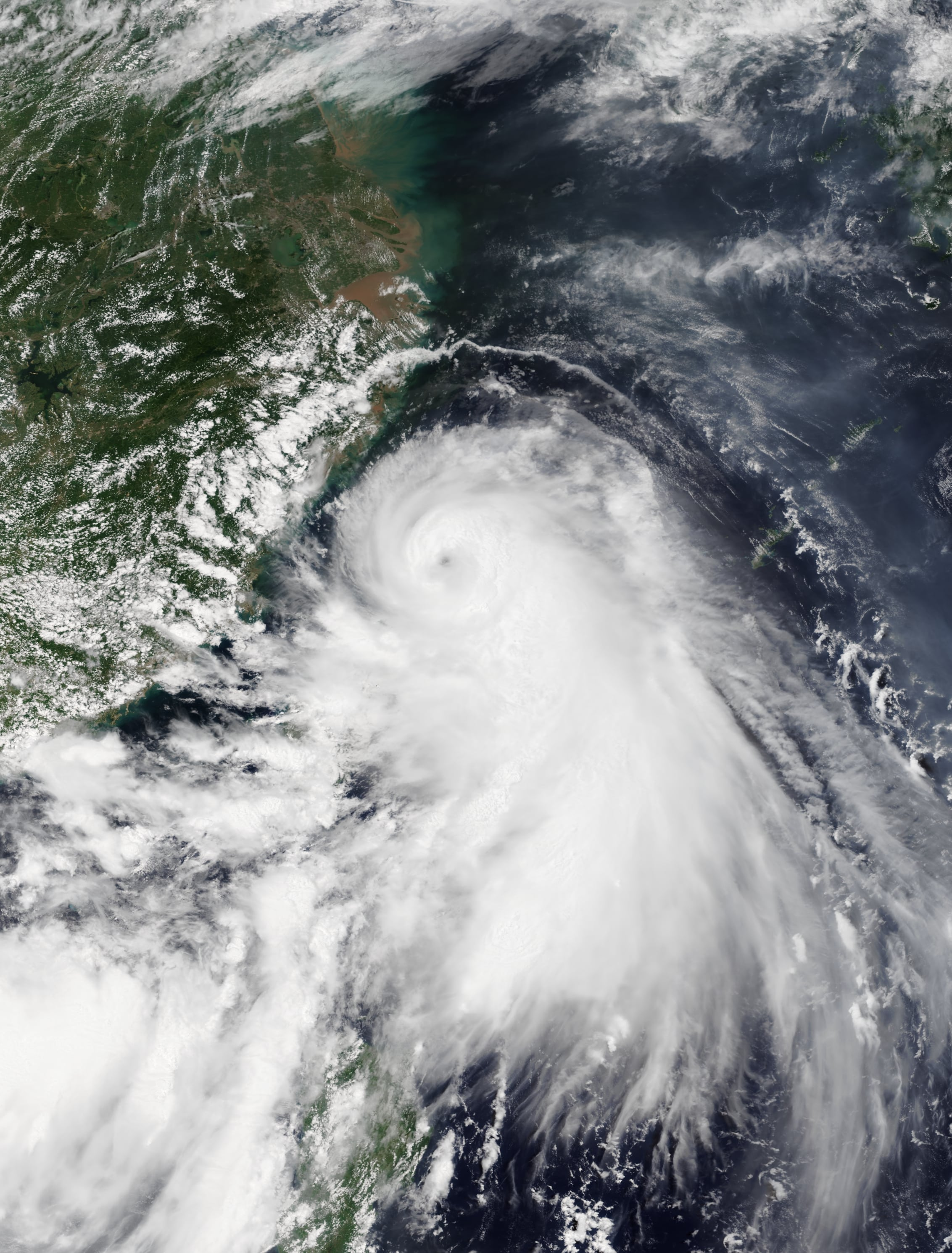
- Typhoon Hagupit approaching China near peak intensity on August 3

Meteorological history
- Formed: July 30, 2020
- Extratropical: August 5, 2020
- Dissipated: August 14, 2020

Typhoon
- 10-minute sustained (JMA)
- Highest winds: 130 km/h (80 mph)
- Lowest pressure: 975 hPa (mbar); 28.79 inHg

Category 1-equivalent typhoon
- 1-minute sustained (SSHWS/JTWC)
- Highest winds: 140 km/h (85 mph)
- Lowest pressure: 971 hPa (mbar); 28.67 inHg

Overall effects
- Fatalities: 17 total
- Missing: 11
- Damage: $1.5 billion (2020 USD)
- Areas affected: Ryukyu Islands, Taiwan, East China, Korean Peninsula, Kamchatka Peninsula, Alaska
- IBTrACS
- Part of the 2020 Pacific typhoon season

Typhoon Hagupit, (Note: The name Hagupit (Tagalog: hagupit, [hɐ.ɣʊ.ˈpɪt̚]) was contributed by the Philippines and means "lashing, whipping" in Tagalog.) known in the Philippines as Severe Tropical Storm Dindo, was a Category 1 typhoon that heavily impacted Eastern China and South Korea in early August 2020. It was the fourth named storm and the second typhoon of the annual typhoon season.

The JMA began monitoring a tropical depression that developed in the Philippine Sea on July 30, with PAGASA assigning the name “Dindo” to the storm, later that day it strengthened into a tropical storm, according to the JMA. PAGASA issued its final advisory on Dindo early on August 3, as it moved out of their area of responsibility. Hagupit intensified into a typhoon on August 3, before making landfall in Wenzhou, China at 19:30 UTC that day at peak intensity. Hagupit subsequently weakened over China, before degenerating into an extratropical low on August 5. Hagupit's remnants persisted for another several days, as the storm moved eastward, before dissipating south of Alaska on August 14.

Hagupit caused over a foot of rainfall in portions of Eastern China and South Korea. Hagupit caused 17 fatalities due to bringing heavy rains in the Korean Peninsula, and triggered a landslide which killed 6 people. Damage totals was reported to be at US$1.5 billion.

== Meteorological history ==
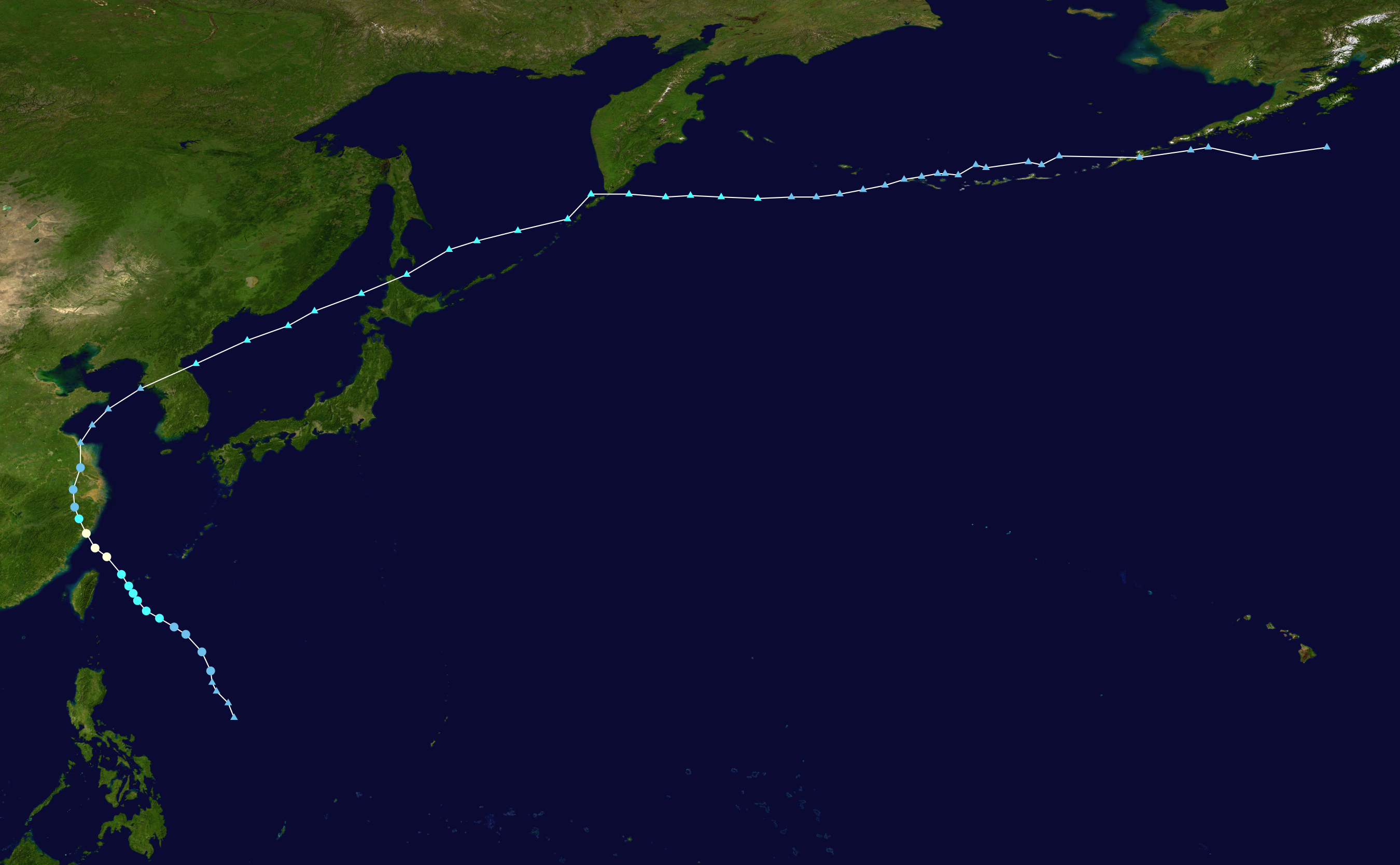
Map plotting the storm's track and intensity, according to the Saffir–Simpson scale Map key Saffir–Simpson scale Tropical depression (≤38 mph, ≤62 km/h) Tropical storm (39–73 mph, 63–118 km/h) Category 1 (74–95 mph, 119–153 km/h) Category 2 (96–110 mph, 154–177 km/h) Category 3 (111–129 mph, 178–208 km/h) Category 4 (130–156 mph, 209–251 km/h) Category 5 (≥157 mph, ≥252 km/h) Unknown Storm type Tropical cyclone Subtropical cyclone Extratropical cyclone, remnant low, tropical disturbance, or monsoon depression

In late July 2020, the JMA designated a weak tropical depression that developed approximately 991 km (616 mi) east-northeast of Manila, Philippines. Later on the same day, the Philippine Atmospheric, Geophysical and Astronomical Services Administration named the depression as Dindo. In the following hours, the Joint Typhoon Warning Center gave a Tropical Cyclone Formation Alert on the system. The next day, the JTWC designated Dindo as 03W.

Within an overall favorable environment of low vertical wind shear, strong equatorial outflow and 31 °C sea surface temperatures, Dindo further organized in the Philippine Sea, and around midday of the same day, the JMA upgraded the depression to a tropical storm, naming it as Hagupit. Hagupit then began gradually intensifying, and by 09:00 UTC on August 2, the JTWC upgraded the storm to a category 1 typhoon. Late on the same day, JMA upgraded Hagupit to a severe tropical storm. As Hagupit moved generally northwestward, it exited the Philippine Area of Responsibility (PAR), prompting PAGASA to issue its final advisory on the system.

Now northeast of Taiwan, Hagupit was upgraded into a typhoon by the JMA. The storm will later peak in intensity when the JMA reported a pressure drop into 975 hPa (28.28 inHg). At around 19:30 UTC, Hagupit made landfall in Zhejiang, China, with winds of 85 mph and pressure of 975 mbar (hPa). After its landfall, Hagupit began gradually weakening, and on early August 3, Hagupit was downgraded into a tropical storm by the JTWC. At the same time, the JMA downgraded Hagupit into a severe tropical storm. Around midday of the same day, the JTWC downgraded Hagupit into a tropical depression, and later issued their final advisory on the weakening storm, but the JMA still monitored Hagupit as a tropical storm, although the said storm was undergoing an extratropical transition.

The transition completed on August 6, and the JMA issued their final advisory on Hagupit. Over the next several days, Hagupit's remnants moved northeastward, and then eastward, before dissipating just south of Alaska on August 14.

== Preparations and impact ==
=== China ===
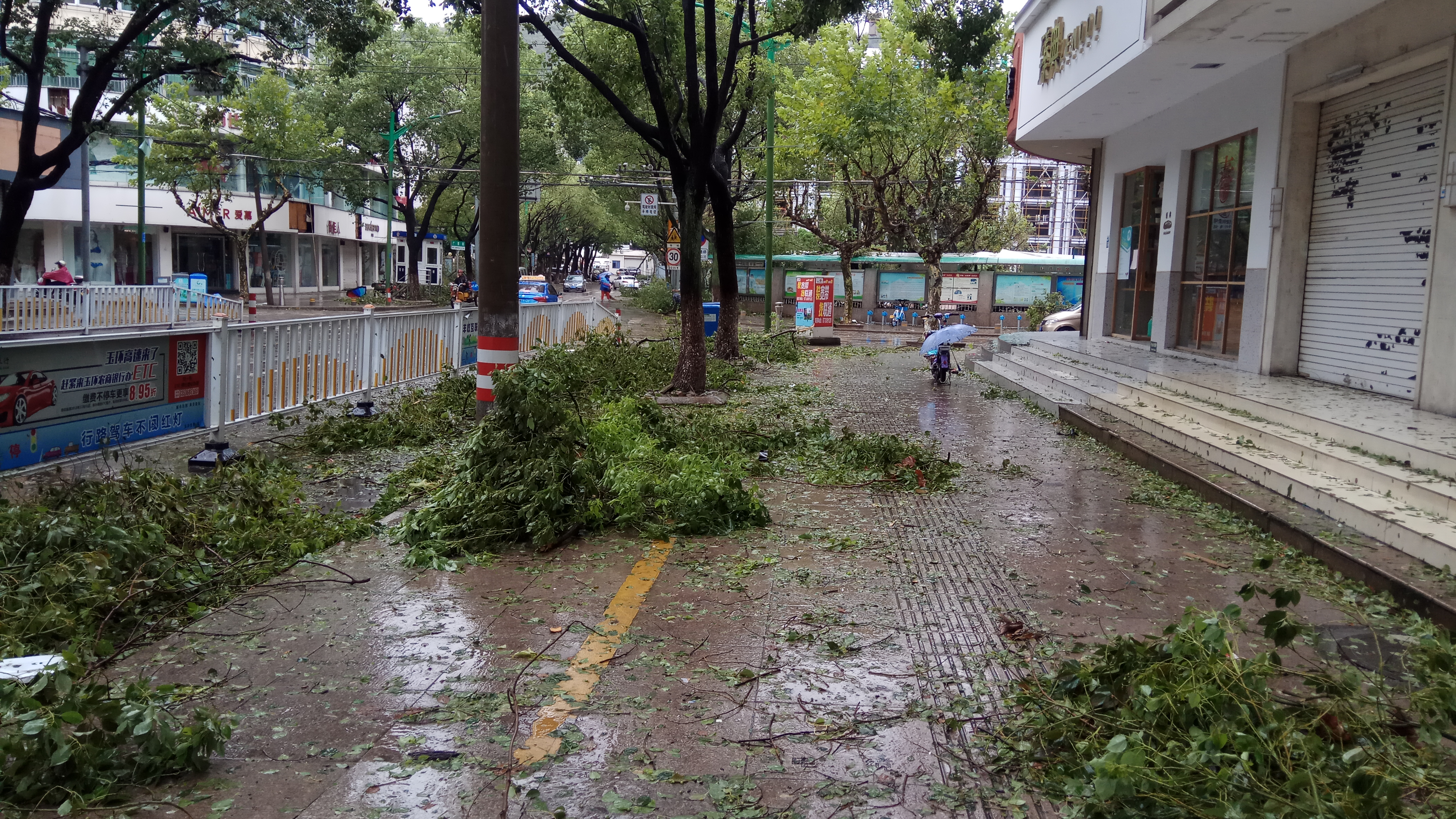
Damage from Hagupit in Yuhuan City, China

In advance of Hagupit, Chinese officials ordered the evacuation of areas vulnerable to flooding. At least 200,000 people evacuated to shelters in Wenzhou. Ferry services were shut down and trains ran shortened routines in the cities of Taizhou and Wenzhou. Fishing boats in the provinces of Fujian and Zhejiang were advised to return to shore.

Hagupit caused torrential rainfall over portions of China peaking at 13.11 inches (333 mm) in the Jingshan district of Wenzhou. Waves up to 14 ft. (4.2 m) were reported, in association with Hagupit. Over 830,000 customers lost power in China. A 62-year-old woman was killed when she fell 11 stories out of a broken window in Yuhuan, where a panel truck was toppled by high winds. Direct economic losses reached ¥10.46 billion (US$1.5 billion).

=== Elsewhere ===
The Central Weather Bureau posted a heavy rain warning for portions of Taiwan. Hagupit dropped heavy precipitation up to 3.15 inches (80 mm) in parts of the country. A government employee drowned due to heavy rains caused by Hagupit and a motorcyclist was injured when they collided with a fallen tree. Hagupit brought tropical storm-force winds to the southern portion of the Ryukyu Islands of Japan. Fortunately, no injuries or damage were reported. In the Korean Peninsula, another round of torrential rainfall caused by Hagupit worsened already severe flooding in the area. Up to 5.7 inches (145 mm) of rain was reported in the South Korean city of Suwon. 15 people were reported dead across South Korea, 6 of them following a landslide in South Chungcheong Province, 11 people were reported missing, and 9 people were injured.

== See also ==
- Weather of 2020
- Tropical cyclones in 2020
- Other typhoons named Hagupit
- Other typhoons named Dindo
- Typhoon Malakas (2016)
- Tropical Storm Nanmadol (2017)
- Typhoon Lekima (2019)
