= List of storms named Dindo =

The name Dindo has been used for six tropical cyclones in the Philippine Area of Responsibility by PAGASA in the Western Pacific Ocean.

- Typhoon Nida (2004) (T0402, 04W, Dindo) – a May Category 5 storm that approached the Bicol Region.
- Severe Tropical Storm Matmo (2008) (T0803, 04W, Dindo) – churned away from land.
- Tropical Storm Doksuri (2012) (T1206, 07W, Dindo) – made landfall over Nanshui, Guangdong, China
- Typhoon Lionrock (2016) (T1610, 12W, Dindo) – an erratic typhoon that struck the coast of Tōhoku.
- Typhoon Hagupit (2020) (T2004, 03W, Dindo) – formed off the coast of Luzon and hit China.
- Tropical Storm Jongdari (2024) (T2409, 10W, Dindo) – struck Ryukyu Islands and the Korean Peninsula.

Preceded by Carina	Pacific typhoon season names Dindo	Succeeded by Edring
