= List of storms named Rammasun =

The name Rammasun (Thai: รามสูร, [raːm˧ ma˦˥ suːn˩˩˦]) has been used for three tropical cyclones in the western North Pacific Ocean. This name was originally spelled Ramasoon by the WMO before an orthographic update in 2002. The name was contributed by Thailand and refers to Ramasura, god of thunder in Thai epics, in Thai.

- Typhoon Rammasun (2002) (T0205, 09W, Florita) – a Category 3 typhoon that caused flooding in the Philippines and struck Korea as a tropical storm.
- Typhoon Rammasun (2008) (T0802, 03W, Butchoy) – a Category 4 super typhoon that stayed out to sea.
- Typhoon Rammasun (2014) (T1409, 09W, Glenda) – a Category 5 super typhoon that impacted the Philippines and China.

The name Rammasun was retired following the 2014 Pacific typhoon season and was replaced with Bualoi.
