= List of storms named Cosme =

The name Cosme has been used for ten Tropical cyclones worldwide, eight in the Eastern Pacific Ocean, and two in the Philippines by PAGASA in the Western Pacific Ocean.

In the Eastern Pacific:

- Tropical Storm Cosme (1983), did not affect land.
- Hurricane Cosme (1989), a large Category 1 hurricane that made landfall near Acapulco; brought heavy rains, which killed at least 30 people due to drowning.
- Hurricane Cosme (1995), a Category 1 hurricane that never affected land, caused no damage or fatalities.
- Tropical Storm Cosme (2001), did not make landfall; dissipated about 820 mi (1,320 km) west-southwest of Cabo San Lucas, Mexico.
- Hurricane Cosme (2007), a Category 1 hurricane that stayed far from land, effects were mostly minor.
- Hurricane Cosme (2013), a Category 1 hurricane; did not make landfall but caused minor damage to the west coast of Mexico and the Revillagigedo Islands.
- Tropical Storm Cosme (2019), never threatened land.
- Tropical Storm Cosme (2025), strong tropical storm that stayed at sea.

In the Western Pacific:

- Typhoon Sudal (2004) (T0401, 03W, Cosme), strongest typhoon to strike the island of Yap in the Federated States of Micronesia in about 50 years.
- Tropical Storm Halong (2008) (T0804, 05W, Cosme), caused 58 deaths and $94 million (USD) in damage in Luzon.

The name Cosme was retired following the 2008 Pacific typhoon season, and was replaced with Carina.
