= List of storms named Carina =

The name Carina has been used for five tropical cyclones worldwide: four in the Philippine Area of Responsibility in the West Pacific Ocean and one in the South-West Indian Ocean.

In the West Pacific, where it replaced Cosme on the naming lists:

- Severe Tropical Storm Talim (2012) (T1205, 06W, Carina) – a severe tropical storm that affected China and Taiwan.
- Severe Tropical Storm Nida (2016) (T1604, 07W, Carina) – a severe tropical storm that made landfall in the Philippines and China.
- Tropical Depression Carina (2020) – affected the Philippines and Taiwan.
- Typhoon Gaemi (2024) (T2403, 05W, Carina) – a powerful typhoon that impacted East China, Taiwan, and the Philippines.

In the South-West Indian:

- Cyclone Carina (2006) – an intense tropical cyclone.

Preceded by Butchoy	Pacific typhoon season names Carina	Succeeded by Dindo
