= Typhoon Sudal =

Pacific typhoon in 2004

Typhoon Sudal (Cosme)
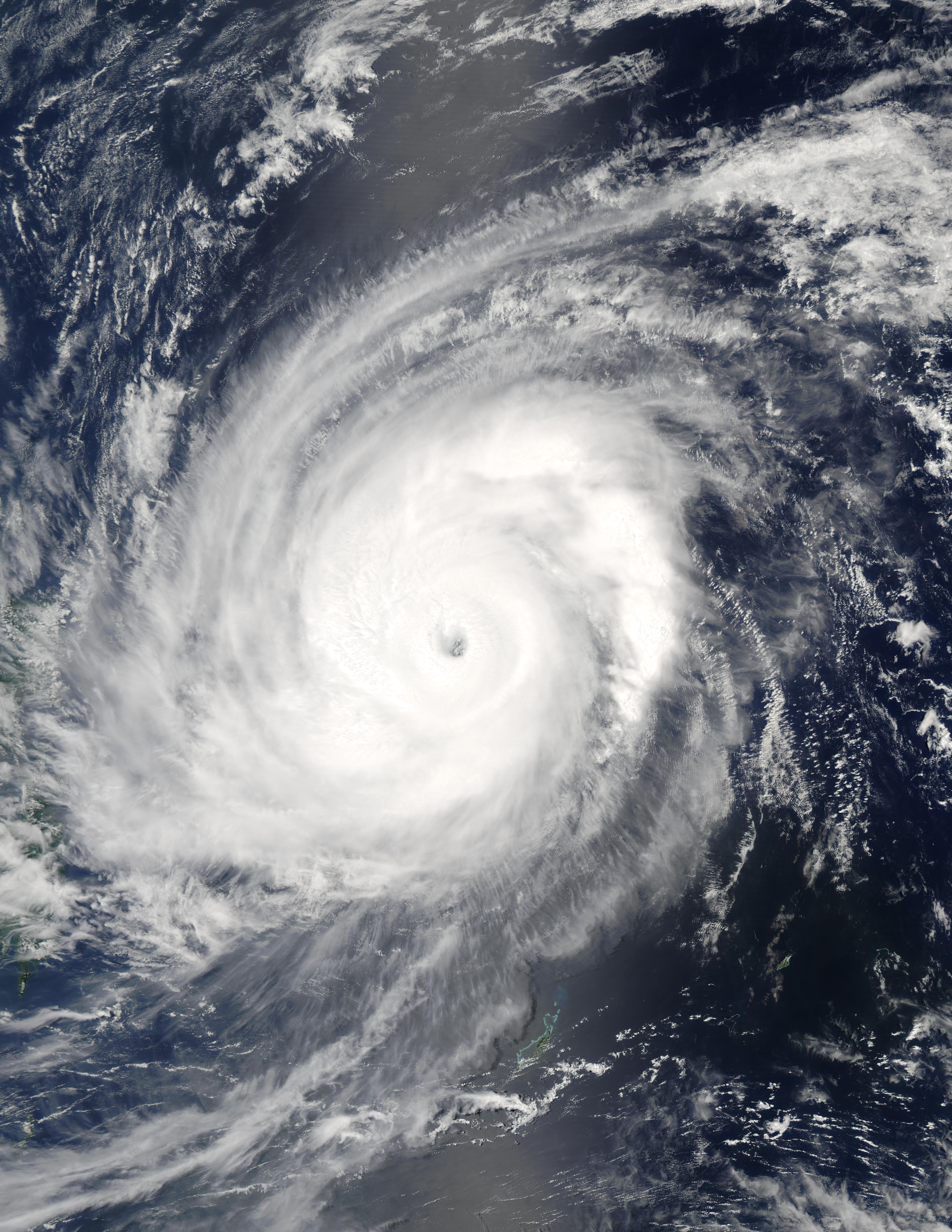
- Typhoon Sudal shortly after peak intensity on April 11

Meteorological history
- Formed: April 2, 2004
- Extratropical: April 16, 2004
- Dissipated: April 18, 2004

Very strong typhoon
- 10-minute sustained (JMA)
- Highest winds: 165 km/h (105 mph)
- Lowest pressure: 940 hPa (mbar); 27.76 inHg

Category 4-equivalent super typhoon
- 1-minute sustained (SSHWS/JTWC)
- Highest winds: 240 km/h (150 mph)
- Lowest pressure: 910 hPa (mbar); 26.87 inHg

Overall effects
- Fatalities: None reported
- Damage: $14 million (2004 USD)
- Areas affected: Federated States of Micronesia (particularly Yap state), Guam, Rota, Iwo Jima
- IBTrACS
- Part of the 2004 Pacific typhoon season

Typhoon Sudal, (Note: The name Sudal (Korean: 수달, [sʰuda̠ɭ]) was contributed by South Korea and refers to the Eurasian otter (Lutra lutra) in Korean.) known in the Philippines as Typhoon Cosme, was the strongest typhoon to strike the island of Yap in the Federated States of Micronesia (FSM) in about 50 years. Yap is one of the four administrative divisions of the FSM. The entire island, only 17 km (11 mi) in length, experienced typhoon force winds, and 90% of the structures were damaged or destroyed. Damage was most severe in southeastern Yap, where the eyewall struck and winds exceeded 185 km/h (115 mph), but the center of the typhoon passed south of the island.

Typhoon Sudal originally formed on April 2, 2004, out of a persistent area of convection east of the FSM. It moved mostly westward for the first week of its duration, with brief northerly and southwesterly turns. Sudal attained tropical storm status on April 5, and it gradually intensified into a typhoon, which is a tropical cyclone with winds of at least 119 km/h (74 mph) and is the equivalent of a hurricane in the Atlantic Ocean. On April 9, it passed just south of Yap, and shortly thereafter its peak winds were estimated at 240 km/h (150 mph). The typhoon passed into the area of warning responsibility for PAGASA, which also gave Sudal the local name Cosme in advisories. The typhoon later moved to the northwest and eventually to the northeast, becoming an extratropical cyclone on April 16 and dissipating two days later.

In addition to the damage on Yap, the typhoon dropped heavy rainfall in Chuuk in the Federated States of Micronesia, where some minor crop damage occurred. Sudal also brushed the United States islands of Guam and Rota with high waves and light rainfall, and later moved very close to the uninhabited Japanese island of Iwo Jima. Overall damage was $14 million (2004 USD, $16.1 million 2010 USD), most of which was on Yap, although no fatalities or serious injuries were reported.

== Meteorological history ==
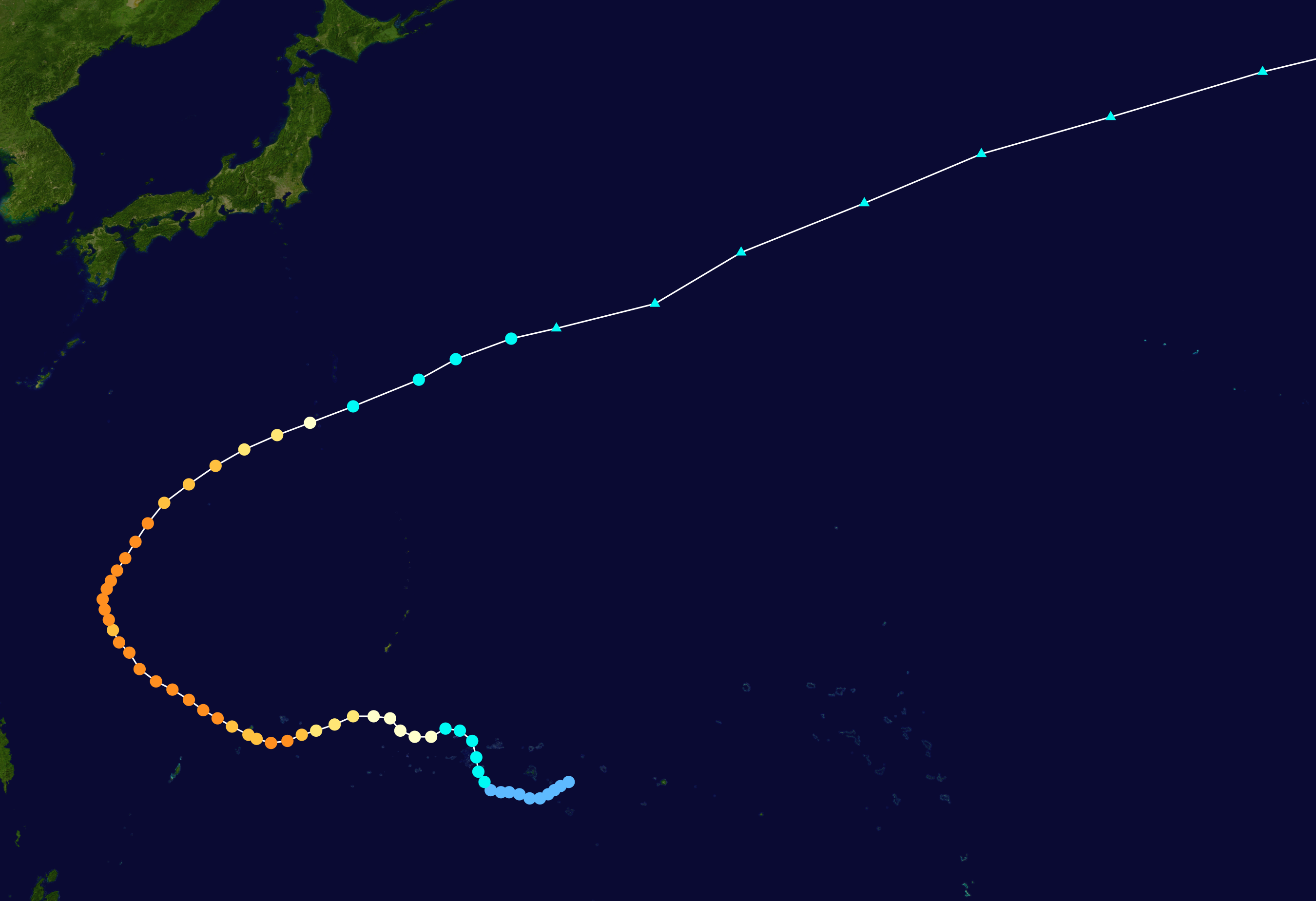
Map plotting the storm's track and intensity, according to the Saffir–Simpson scale Map key Saffir–Simpson scale Tropical depression (≤38 mph, ≤62 km/h) Tropical storm (39–73 mph, 63–118 km/h) Category 1 (74–95 mph, 119–153 km/h) Category 2 (96–110 mph, 154–177 km/h) Category 3 (111–129 mph, 178–208 km/h) Category 4 (130–156 mph, 209–251 km/h) Category 5 (≥157 mph, ≥252 km/h) Unknown Storm type Tropical cyclone Subtropical cyclone Extratropical cyclone, remnant low, tropical disturbance, or monsoon depression

The origins of Typhoon Sudal were from a persistent area of convection, or thunderstorms, southeast of Pohnpei in the Federated States of Micronesia toward the end of March 2004. Initially, it was in an area of high wind shear, which is the change in wind direction with height and is unfavorable for tropical cyclogenesis. The unfavorable conditions gradually abated, which allowed convection to increase over a broad, developing circulation center. On April 2, the Japan Meteorological Agency (JMA) classified the system as a weak tropical depression near Chuuk in the FSM. It was later classified with the international designation of 0401, meaning it was the first tropical cyclone of 2004. Slow development continued as the system moved slowly westward, and two days later it was classified as Tropical Depression 03W by the Joint Typhoon Warning Center (JTWC); this was the third tropical cyclone tracked by the agency. Shortly thereafter, the JTWC upgraded the depression to tropical storm status, after convection increased over the circulation.

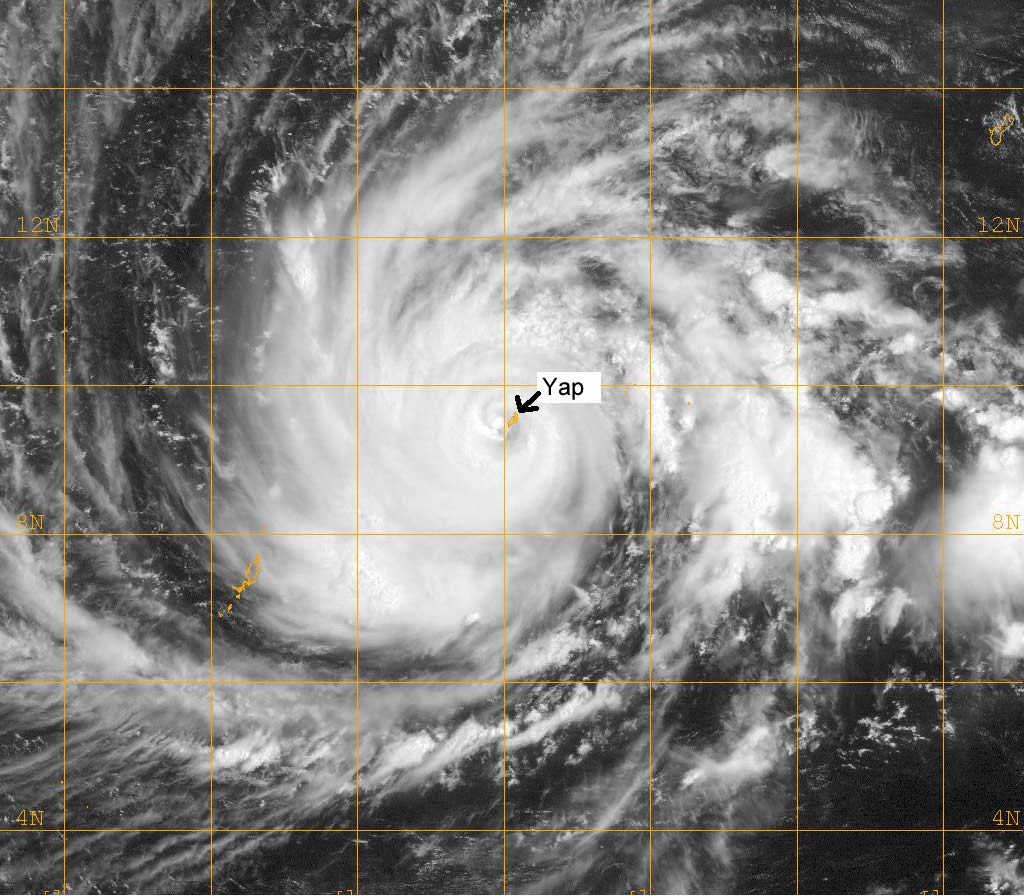
The eye of Typhoon Sudal striking Yap on April 9

While steadily intensifying, the system turned toward the north. On April 5, the JMA named the system Sudal, after assessing its maximum 10-minute sustained winds at 65 km/h (40 mph). Concurrently, the JTWC estimated 1-minute sustained winds of 100 km/h (65 mph). After crossing over the island of Poluwat, a building ridge to the north caused Sudal to turn west-southwestward. On April 6, an eye feature began forming, and the JTWC upgraded Sudal to typhoon strength about 540 km (340 mi) southeast of Guam, a small island under possession of the United States. The JMA did not follow suit until late the following day, by which time the eye had become more distinct. Around that time, the typhoon turned toward the northwest, and initially it was thought that Sudal would pass safely north of Yap in the FSM. Instead, it turned to the west-southwest toward the island as the ridge intensified. On April 8, the typhoon intensified rapidly; the JTWC reported 1-minute winds of 215 km/h (130 mph), or the equivalent of a Category 4 on the Saffir–Simpson hurricane scale. Weakening slightly as its forward motion slowed, Typhoon Sudal passed about 45 km (28 mi) south of Yap at 0000 UTC on April 9, which was its closest approach to the island.

Intensification continued throughout the day on April 9, with the appearance of concentric eyewalls on satellite imagery; such a feature is indicative of an intense tropical cyclone. Early on April 10, the JTWC estimated that Sudal attained peak 1-minute sustained winds of 240 km/h (150 mph), making the cyclone a super typhoon. At the same time, the JMA estimated peak 10-minute winds of 165 km/h (105 mph), as well as a barometric pressure of 940 mbar (27.76 inHg). Also on that day, Sudal entered the area of warning responsibility of the Philippine Atmospheric, Geophysical and Astronomical Services Administration (PAGASA), which provided the name "Cosme" for local advisories. For several days, the typhoon continued to the northwest, fluctuating in intensity but remaining powerful. On April 12, Sudal turned toward the north and northeast through a weakness in the ridge, and its eye increased to a diameter of about 85 km (53 mi). The next day, the typhoon attained a secondary peak intensity with 1-minute sustained winds reaching 230 km/h (145 mph), although it gradually weakened subsequently due to a combination of increasing upper-level wind shear and cooler water temperatures.

Early on April 15, Sudal passed very near the uninhabited Japanese island of Iwo Jima as a rapidly weakening typhoon; at the time, its circulation center was exposed from the deepest convection. Shortly thereafter, both the JTWC and JMA downgraded Sudal to tropical storm status. Late on April 15, the JTWC assessed the storm as becoming extratropical, although the JMA maintained advisories until the following day. As an extratropical storm, Sudal continued northeastward until losing its identity early on April 18, well east of Japan and far south of the Aleutian Islands.

== Impact ==
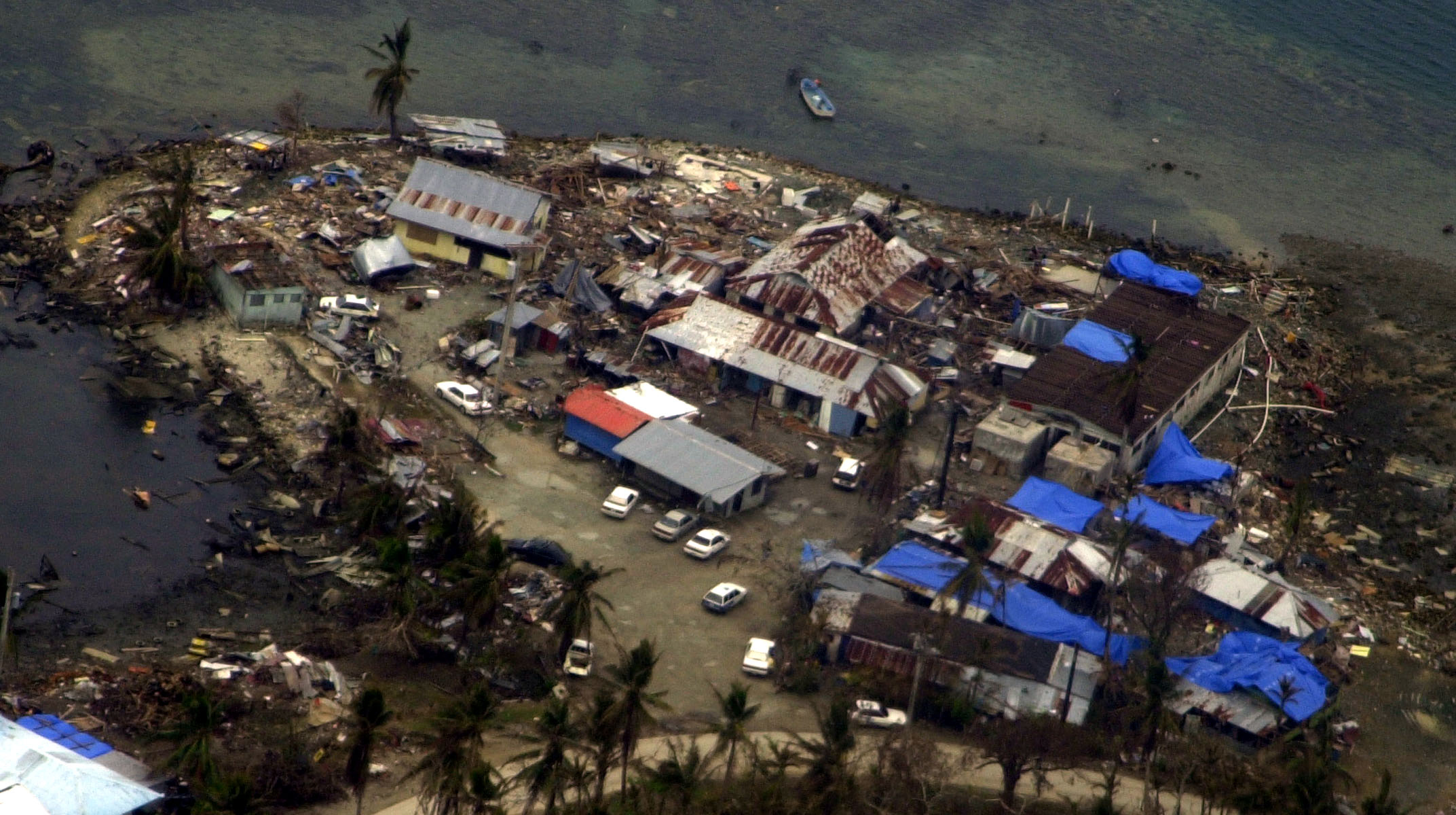
Damage wrought by the storm on Yap

Early in its duration as a weak tropical storm, Sudal passed near Chuuk state in the Federated States of Micronesia (FSM). One station reported 170 mm (6.5 in) of rainfall in a 24‑hour period. The passage of the storm left minor roof damage and some crop damage, due to storm surge contaminating groundwater. No deaths or injuries were reported in the state. The storm briefly threatened Guam, and as it passed south of the island, Sudal produced 5.5 m (18 ft) waves and a 0.9 m (3.0 ft) storm surge. A station at Apra Harbor recorded a 69 km/h (43 mph) wind gust, and light rainfall of around 50 mm (2.0 in) was reported, although no damage was reported on the island. High waves also occurred on Rota in the Northern Mariana Islands. The FSM is an independent nation in Compact of Free Association with the United States, and the latter nation is responsible for aid and protection.

Further west, Typhoon Sudal intensified quickly as it moved through the Caroline Islands and later Yap state. On Ulithi, a wind gust of 132 km/h (82 mph) was reported, and 6.34 inches (161 mm) of rainfall occurred in a 24‑hour period. High waves of over 5 m (16 ft) struck the island, causing severe beach erosion and damaging subsistence crops. The winds downed a few trees and wrecked some poorly built homes. On nearby Faraulep and Fais islands, similar meteorological conditions and damages were reported. The small Ngulu Atoll received gale-force winds and heavy rainfall, which destroyed half of the island's water storage tanks. Later in its duration, Sudal passed near Iwo Jima, producing wind gusts of 141 km/h (88 mph).

=== Yap ===
The worst of the damage occurred on the island of Yap. Initially, the typhoon was expected to pass north of the island without affecting it significantly, but instead the island experienced the brunt of the storm. Typhoon Lupit affected the island in the previous year, from which the islanders were still recovering. With the last minute change in direction, government officials rushed to complete preparations on the island. On the day before the typhoon struck, storm shelters were opened in schools and government buildings that could withstand the winds of Sudal. In anticipation of significant damage, Yap officials sent a request to the FSM government for emergency aid to clean up after the storm.

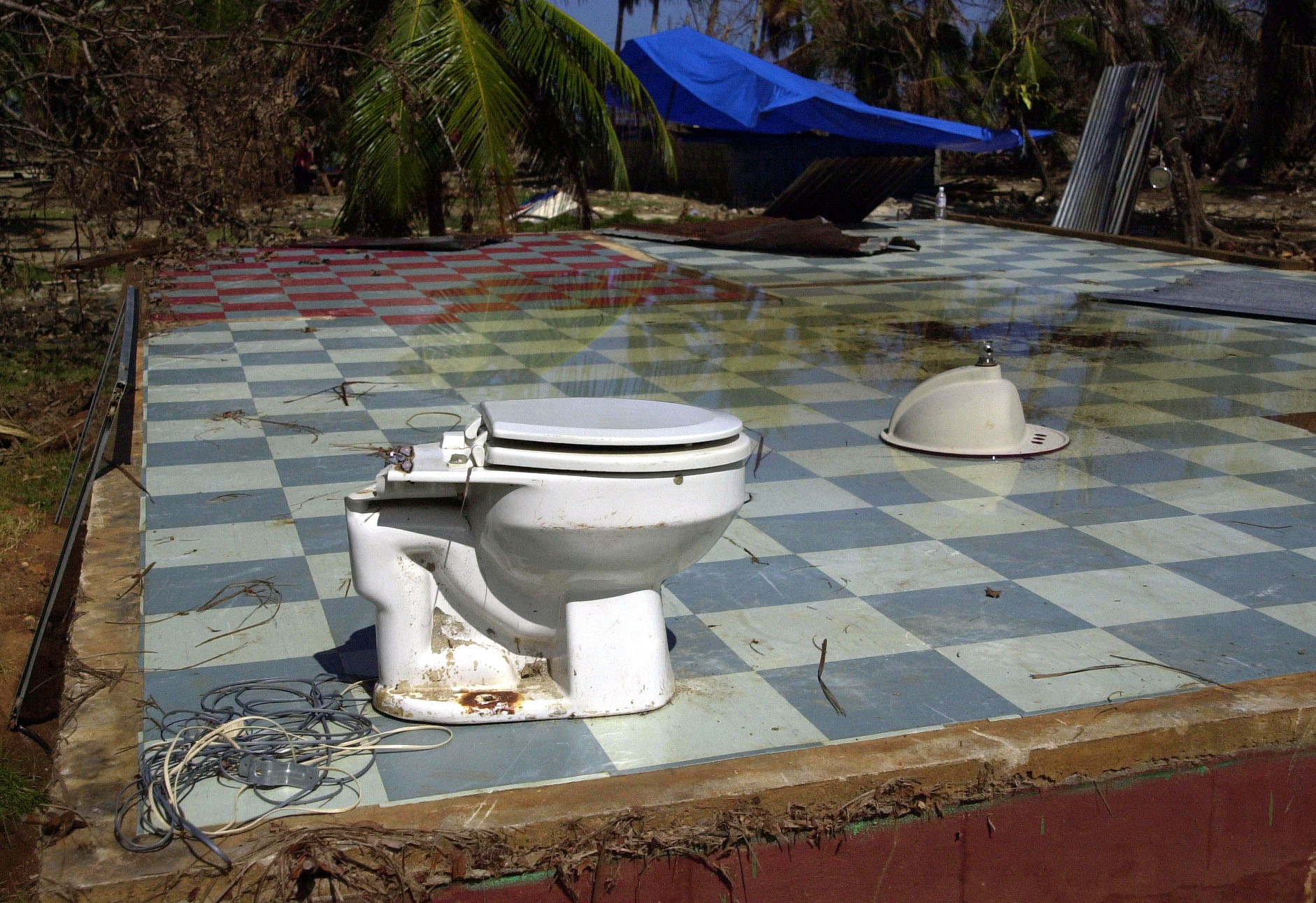
A home completely destroyed by Sudal on Yap

On April 9, the eye of Sudal briefly passed over the southern portion of the island, and winds of 185 km/h (115 mph) struck the island for about four hours. The entire island, only 17 km (11 mi) in length, experienced typhoon force winds. Yap International Airport recorded a peak wind gust of 181 km/h (112 mph); a subsequent survey estimated wind gusts on the island reached 226 km/h (140 mph). Heavy rainfall occurred during Sudal's passage, including 200 mm (7.9 in) in a 48‑hour period at the airport. The lowest pressure on the island was 958.5 mbar (28.30 inHg). Along the coast, the typhoon produced waves of 6.7 m (22 ft) in height, along with a 3.7 m (12 ft) storm surge; the combination sunk several ships and heavily damaged the island's coral reefs, the latter which is one of Yap's primary tourism attractions.

When Typhoon Sudal struck the island, there were about 8,000 people living on Yap, with about 1,700 houses. The typhoon destroyed 700 homes, and left another 900 damaged; many of the destroyed homes were wooden. Damage was heaviest in the southeastern portion of the island, including in and around Colonia, the capital city. The strong winds downed trees across the island. Over 90% of the structures on the island were damaged or destroyed, including the hospital, airport, most government facilities, and the water, power and communications systems. One of the five hotels on the island was also destroyed. About 80% of the residents lost power or water after the storm. In the southeastern portion of the island, high waves wrecked most of the coastal homes, and also severely damaged the seawall. The intrusion of salt water destroyed almost all of the food crops on the island. Following the typhoon's passage, about 1,000 people were left homeless, and another 500 were forced to stay in shelters.

Overall damage from Typhoon Sudal totaled about $14 million (2004 USD, $16.1 million 2010 USD), most of which on Yap from property damage. Despite the heavy damage, there were no deaths, although there were initial reports of one fatality. Only 8 people required hospital treatment due to injuries, none of them serious. Typhoon Sudal was the strongest typhoon to strike Yap in about 50 years.

== Aftermath ==
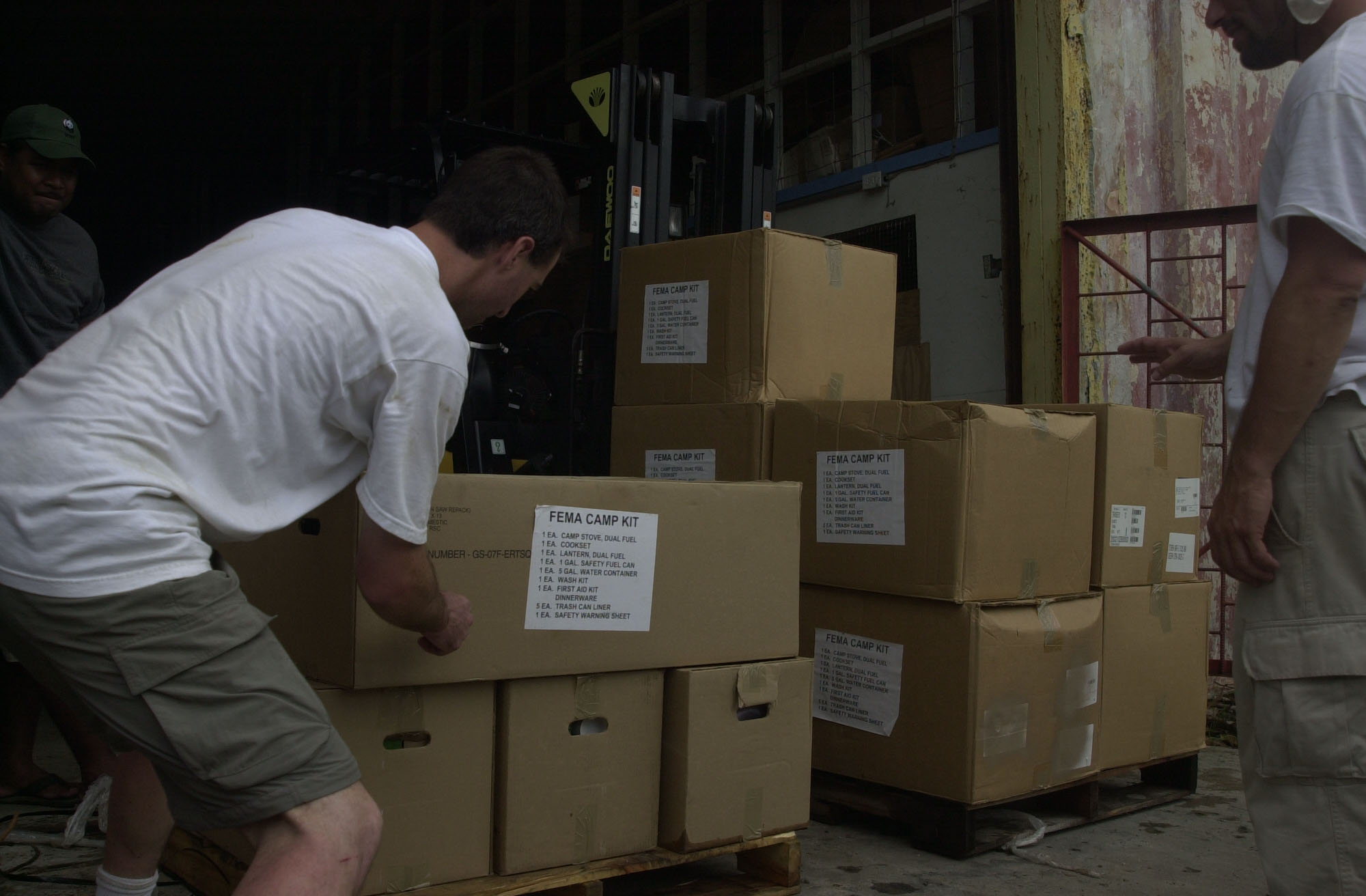
Emergency supplies from the Federal Emergency Management Agency being unloaded from a truck to be deployed on Yap

Following the passage of Sudal, officials in Yap declared a state of emergency, and a day after the typhoon struck, United States President George W. Bush ordered federal disaster aid for the FSM. The latter declaration provided funding for 75% of the debris removal cost and emergency services. Less than a week after the storm, the Pacific Islands Forum provided $11,500 to Yap for relief efforts. Over the subsequent weeks, the FSM government established a typhoon relief fund of about $250,000. Additionally, the United States government allocated $7,443,000 for relief efforts.

Within a few days, the Federal Emergency Management Agency (FEMA) identified primary concerns for the small island, including fixing the water supply, distributing water, clearing roads, and fixing damaged shelters. On the island, the water supply was rapidly diminishing; more than 80% of the islanders were without clean water, and the water from the treatment plant needed to be boiled for extended periods of time. Health issues included dehydration, sickness, and gastrointestinal problems. Without running water, several people bathed in the oil-contaminated harbor where many boats sunk, which caused skin irritations.

Initially, telephone service onto the island was disrupted, and the only method of outside contact was by radio to the University of Guam. The Guam Memorial Hospital dropped a package of medical supplies to Yap, although planes containing aid flying onto the island were disrupted by the damaged runway. About a day after Sudal's passage, the runway was cleared and repaired, which allowed a United States Coast Guard plane to provide relief supplies, including building materials. By April 12, or three days after the typhoon, communication links to the island began to be restored. By four days later, the water treatment plant was repaired. One power station on the island was repaired, but since the strong winds damaged most of the power lines, about 85% of the population remained without electricity. Primary roadways were largely cleared, and all bridges were reopened.

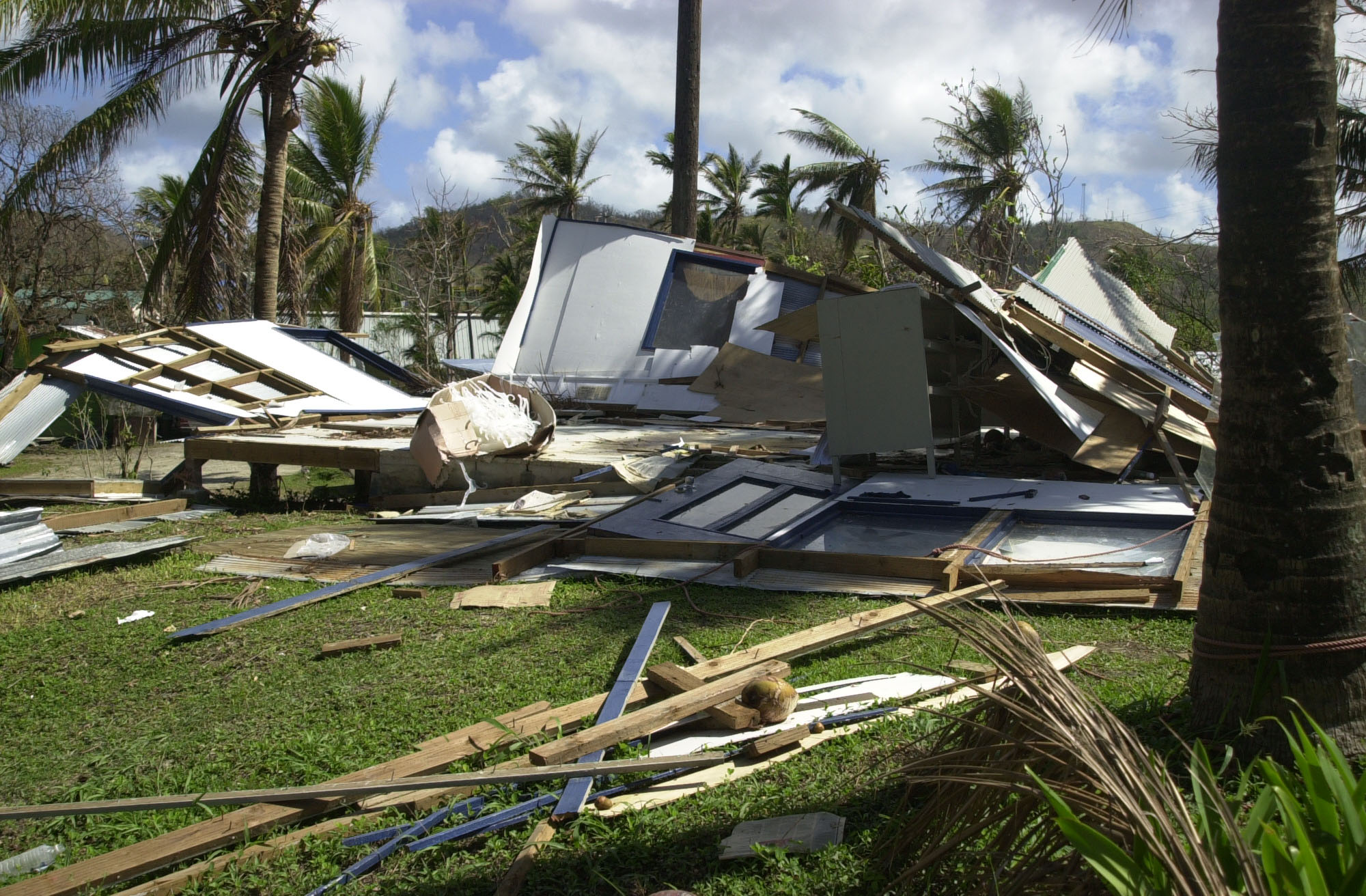
Homes and businesses were destroyed across Yap when Typhoon Sudal sent high winds and waters ashore.

About two weeks after the typhoon's passage, there were still 500 people in 18 shelters in Colonia, the capital city, as well as about 400 people in shelters elsewhere. Many others were either residing with relatives or staying at their damaged properties. The United States Army Corps of Engineers arrived on Yap to coordinate debris removal and installing generators. Officials sent 23 flights of aid to the island, as well as one each to the outlying islands of Ulithi and Fais. About 76,000 litres (20,000 gallons) of water were sent to the island, and five large water tanks were installed. Members of the United States Forest Service arrived to coordinate the receiving and distribution of relief supplies. The Yap hospital was poorly suited to handle the typhoon, due to the lack of medications or emergency medical equipment. About 60 FEMA personnel worked at the hospital, who required additional items, such as their own supply of water and food, to prevent them from acquiring local diseases. During their stay on the island, the group assisted 163 people, mostly for minor issues. Overall, there were about 100 FEMA workers involved on the island, although only 20 stayed there due to lack of hotels and rental cars.

By 26 days after the storm, more than half of the island had power restored, and the cell phone system was fixed. In the weeks and months after the passage of Sudal, water temperatures around Yap decreased from 30 to 24 °C (86 to 75 °F), due to significant upwelling. The drastic decrease caused unusual amounts of fog over the island, as well as significantly lower tides. By September 2004, rebuilding was still underway, and half of the schools, which had previously been used as shelters, reopened to students. Power and water lines were completely restored. The hospital remained damaged with a temporary roof, and although private businesses quickly re-opened, government buildings took longer to be rebuilt; this was due to the lengthy process of receiving aid from FEMA. Additionally, officials required a land survey to determine where structures were safe to be rebuilt.

Due to the heavy damage on Yap, the name Sudal was retired during the 38th session of the Economic and Social Commission for Asia and the Pacific and World Meteorological Organization Typhoon Committee in November 2005; it was replaced with the name Mirinae.

== See also ==
- Other tropical cyclones named Cosme
- List of retired Pacific typhoon names
- Typhoon Abby (1979)
- Typhoon Clara (1984)
- Typhoon Yuri (1991)
- Typhoon Sonca (2005)
- Typhoon Yagi (2006)
- Typhoon Nuri (2014)
- Typhoon In-fa (2015)
