= Typhoon Rammasun (2008) =

Pacific typhoon in 2008

Typhoon Rammasun (Butchoy)
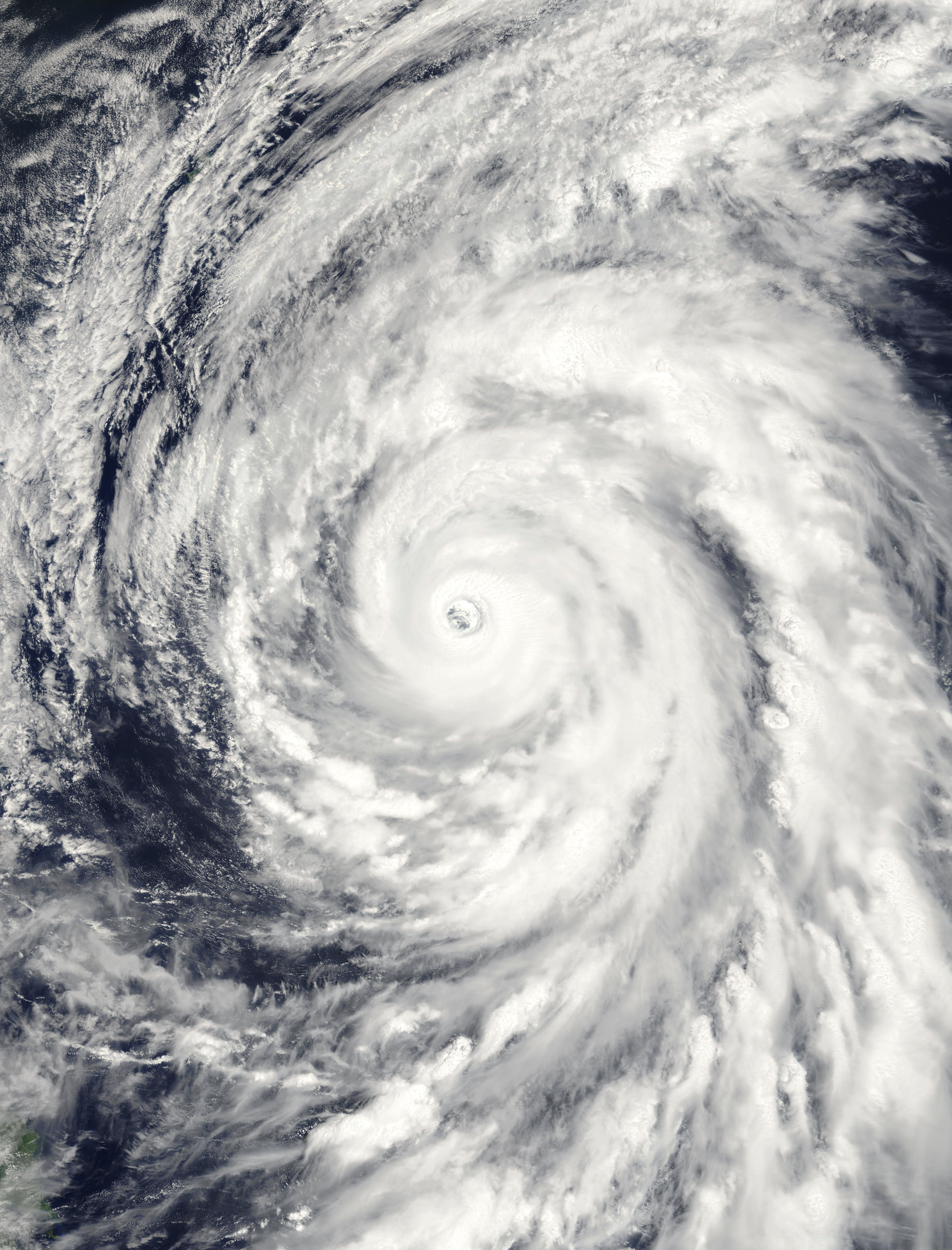
- Typhoon Rammasun shortly after peak intensity on May 11

Meteorological history
- Formed: May 7, 2008
- Extratropical: May 13, 2008
- Dissipated: May 14, 2008

Violent typhoon
- 10-minute sustained (JMA)
- Highest winds: 195 km/h (120 mph)
- Lowest pressure: 915 hPa (mbar); 27.02 inHg

Category 4-equivalent super typhoon
- 1-minute sustained (SSHWS/JTWC)
- Highest winds: 250 km/h (155 mph)
- Lowest pressure: 922 hPa (mbar); 27.23 inHg

Overall effects
- Fatalities: 4 direct
- Injuries: 40
- Damage: $9.6 million (2008 USD)
- Areas affected: Philippines, Japan
- IBTrACS
- Part of the 2008 Pacific typhoon season

Typhoon Rammasun, (Note: The name Rammasun (Thai: รามสูร, [raːm˧ ma˧ suːn˩˩˦]) was contributed by Thailand and refers to Ramasura, the god of thunder in Thai.) known in the Philippines as Super Typhoon Butchoy, was recognized as the second typhoon of the 2008 Pacific typhoon season by the Japan Meteorological Agency (JMA) and the Philippine Atmospheric, Geophysical and Astronomical Services Administration (PAGASA). Rammasun was also recognised as the third tropical storm, the second typhoon and the first super typhoon of the 2008 Pacific typhoon season by the Joint Typhoon Warning Center (JTWC).

Rammasun formed on May 5 as a tropical disturbance. The next day the Joint Typhoon Warning Center issued a tropical cyclone formation alert on the developing disturbance. On May 7 both the JTWC and the Japan Meteorological Agency designated the disturbance as a tropical depression, while PAGASA named the depression Butchoy. Later that day both the JMA and the JTWC upgraded the depression to a tropical storm with the JMA naming the storm Rammasun. On May 9 both the JTWC and the JMA upgraded Rammasun to a typhoon. The next day the JMA and the JTWC reported that Rammasun had reached its peak winds of 195 and 250 km/h (121 and 155 mph) respectively, which made Rammasun a Category 4 super typhoon on the Saffir-Simpson Hurricane Scale. After reaching its peak intensity, Rammasun weakened and was downgraded to severe tropical storm on May 12, before the JTWC declared it extratropical and issued their final advisory. The JMA did not issue their final advisory until several hours later. Within Japan an estimated 10 hectares (25 acres) of farmland were damaged. In all, the typhoon killed four people, injured 40 others and caused $9.6 million (2008 USD) worth of damage in both the Philippines and Japan.

== Meteorological history ==
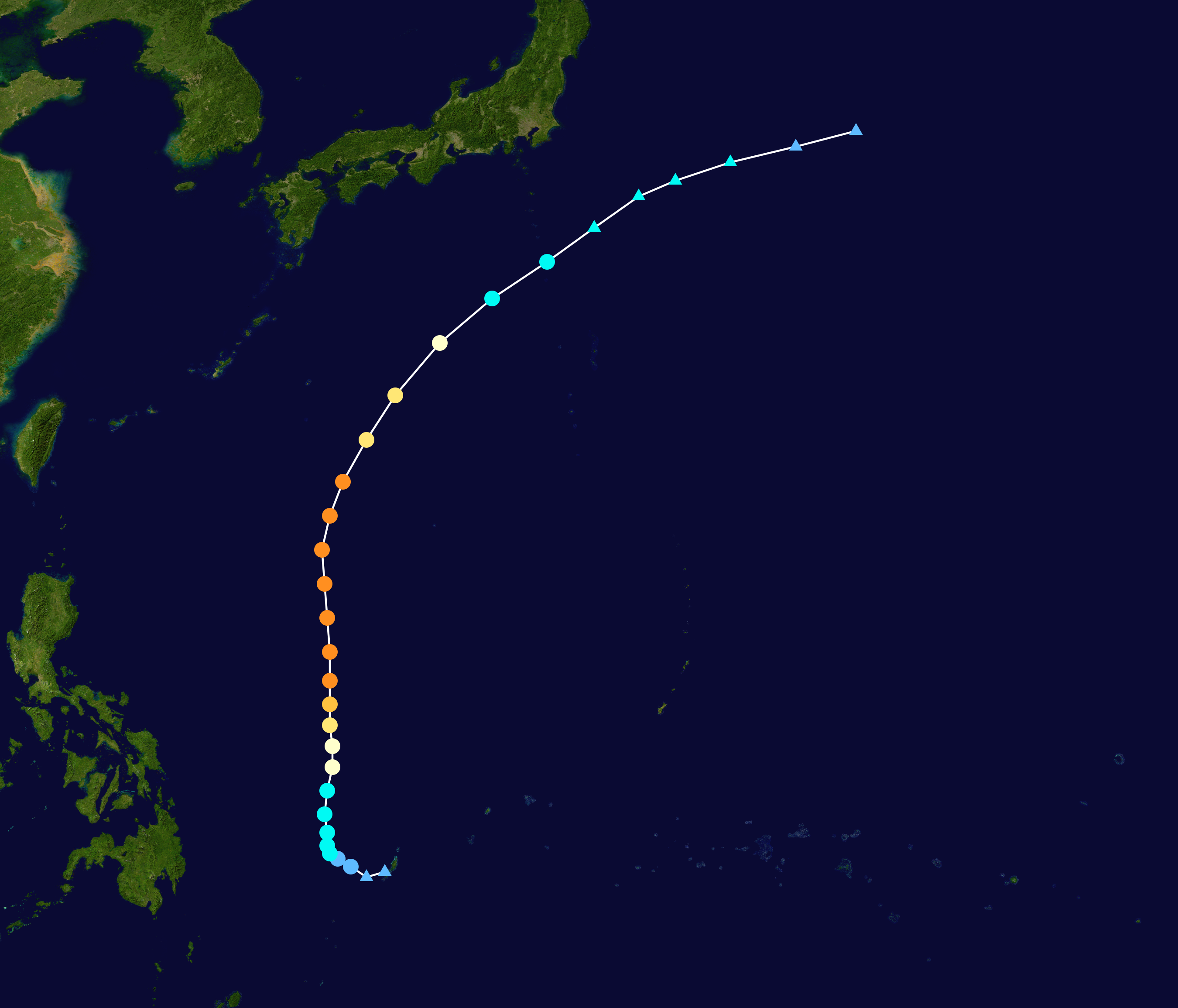
Map plotting the storm's track and intensity, according to the Saffir–Simpson scale Map key Saffir–Simpson scale Tropical depression (≤38 mph, ≤62 km/h) Tropical storm (39–73 mph, 63–118 km/h) Category 1 (74–95 mph, 119–153 km/h) Category 2 (96–110 mph, 154–177 km/h) Category 3 (111–129 mph, 178–208 km/h) Category 4 (130–156 mph, 209–251 km/h) Category 5 (≥157 mph, ≥252 km/h) Unknown Storm type Tropical cyclone Subtropical cyclone Extratropical cyclone, remnant low, tropical disturbance, or monsoon depression

On May 4, 2008, an area of low pressure formed in the Pacific Ocean to the southeast of Yap. The next day, the Joint Typhoon Warning Center (JTWC) upgraded the area of low pressure to a tropical disturbance and assessed the disturbances chances of forming into a significant tropical cyclone within 24 hours as poor. This was because the developing low level circulation center was weak. Early on May 6, the JTWC upgraded the disturbances chances of forming into a tropical cyclone within 24 hours to "fair", as the low level circulation center had consolidated further. A Tropical Cyclone Formation Alert was then issued later that day, by the JTWC who upgraded the disturbance's chances of becoming a tropical cyclone by the next day as good.

Early the next day both the Japan Meteorological Agency (JMA) and the Philippine Atmospheric, Geophysical and Astronomical Services Administration (PAGASA) designated the tropical disturbance as a tropical depression with PAGASA assigning the local name of Butchoy to the depression. At this time the depression was located 790 km (490 mi), to the east of Mindanao in the Philippines. Later that morning the JMA started to issue full advisories on the tropical depression as forecasts showed that the depression could become a tropical storm within 24 hours. The JTWC then designated the depression as Tropical Depression 02W. Later that day both the JTWC and the JMA reported that the depression intensified into a tropical storm, with the JMA assigning the name Rammasun to the storm.

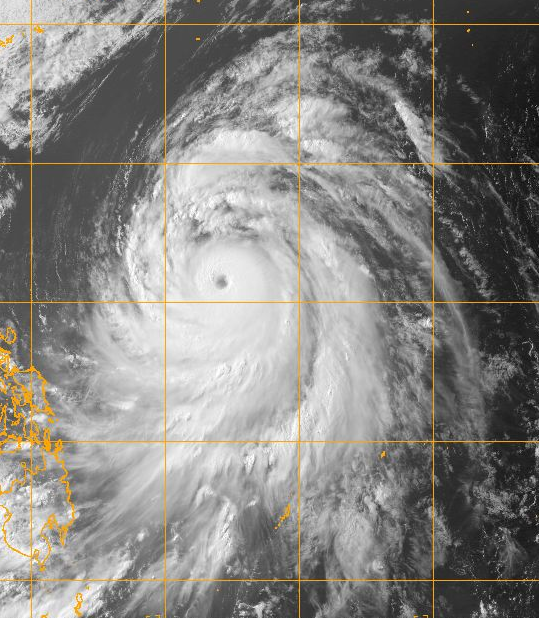
Typhoon Rammasun near peak intensity on May 10

Rammasun continued to intensify and was designated as a severe tropical storm late on May 8. The next day both the JMA and the JTWC reported that Rammasun had intensified into a typhoon. Later that day the JTWC reported that the typhoon had rapidly intensified within the last six hours and had become a Category 3 typhoon on the Saffir–Simpson hurricane wind scale. At the same time the JMA were reporting that Rammasun had winds of 150 km/h (93 mph). The typhoon then continued to intensify quickly with the JMA reporting that Rammasun had winds of 160 km/h (99 mph), the JTWC then reported that Rammasun had become a Category 4 typhoon with winds of 225 km/h (140 mph). Later that day both the JMA and the JTWC reported that the typhoon had reached its peak winds. The JMA reported peak winds of 195 km/h (121 mph) whilst the JTWC reported that Rammasun had peak winds of 250 km/h (160 mph), making it a category 4 super typhoon. Typhoon Rammasun's minimum pressure was officially estimated at 915 hPa which tied with Intense Tropical Cyclone Hondo as second strongest storm of 2008

The JTWC kept Rammasun as a super typhoon until early on May 11, when they reported that the typhoon had weakened into a category four typhoon, while the JMA were reporting that the typhoon had wind speeds of 175 km/h (109 mph). Later that day both agencies reported that the typhoon had weakened even further, with the JMA reporting that Rammasun had winds of 160 km/h (99 mph), while the JTWC reported that Rammasun had weakened into a Category 3 typhoon. The JTWC then reported within their next advisory that Rammasun had weakened into a Category 2 typhoon whilst the JMA reported that the typhoon had winds of 140 km/h (87 mph). The next day as the Typhoon moved out of PAGASA's area of responsibility Rammasun was downgraded to a Category 1 typhoon by the JTWC. Later that day the JMA downgraded Rammasun to a Severe Tropical Storm whilst the JTWC downgraded it to an extratropical cyclone and released their final advisory on the system. The JMA continued to issue advisories on severe tropical storm Rammasun until early the next day when they downgraded it to an extratropical low.

== Naming, preparations, and impact ==
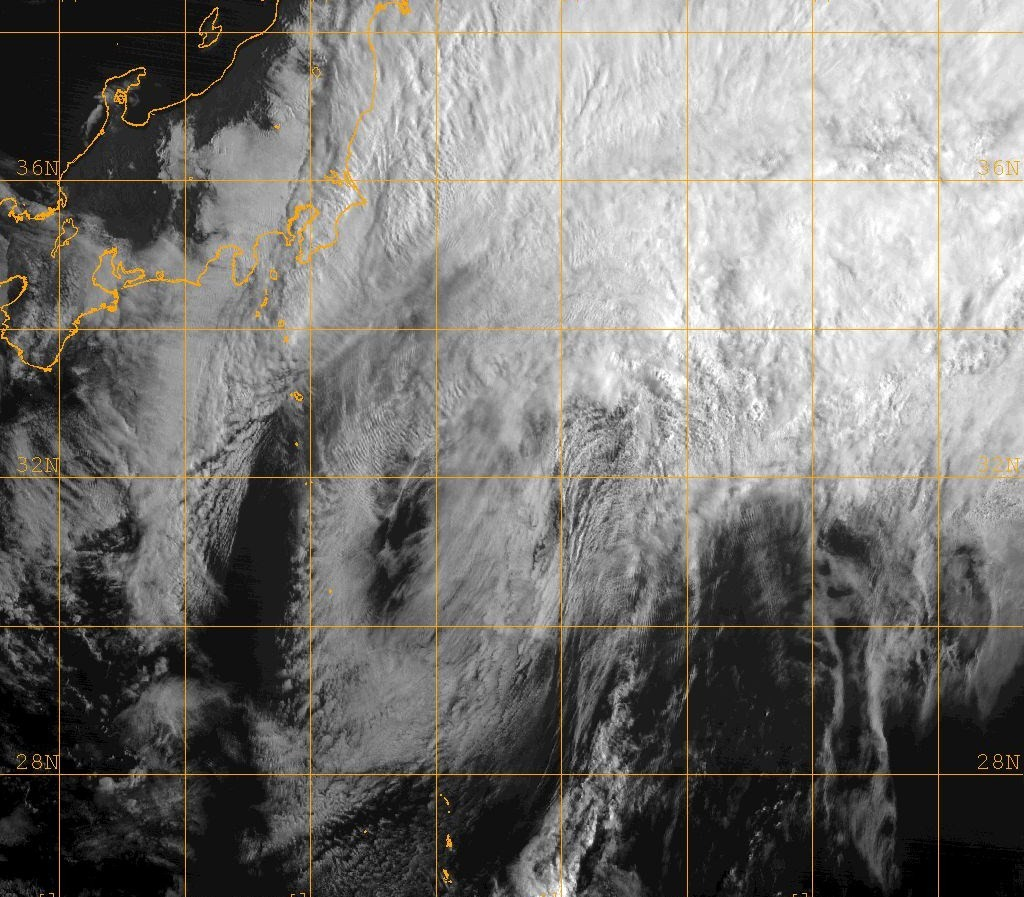
The extratropical remnants of Rammasun passing by Japan on May 12.

The name "Rammasun" was one of the 10 original names submitted by Thailand to the ESCAP/WMO Typhoon Committee for use from January 1, 2000. The name was last used in the 2002 Pacific typhoon season, though it was retired in 2015 after Typhoon Rammasun (the same name used for the 2014 season, Typhoon Glenda in the Philippines) left considerable damages in the Philippines, China and Vietnam. The Philippine Atmospheric, Geophysical and Astronomical Services Administration (PAGASA) also assigned the local name of "Butchoy" to Rammasun; the name "Butchoy" was last used by PAGASA to name a tropical depression in the Philippines in 2004 to name Tropical Storm 02W.

Within the Philippines, PAGASA issued no public storm warning signals, as the storm was too far away from the country to prompt the issuance of such advisories. However, they did warn that the cyclone was expected to enhance the southwest monsoon and bring rain over Central and Southern Luzon, Visayas and Mindanao.

=== Philippines ===
On May 12, a father of two drowned in rough seas produced by Rammasun after saving his children. Later that day, a boat carrying 17 people capsized due to rough seas produced by the typhoon. All of the passengers were rescued the following day by the Philippine Coast Guard. Heavy rains from the outer bands of Rammasun triggered flooding and mudslides in the Philippines. Strong winds also downed numerous trees, one of which, measured at 60 centimetres (2.0 ft) in diameter, fell on three forest guards, killing two and critically injuring the other. In Jaro, Iloilo City, a swollen river overflowed its banks, inundating the district. Local reports stated that water in the area was waist-deep in places. In Cauayan, a 15-year-old girl drowned after being washed away while crossing a bridge. Flooding in Hinoba-an, Negros Occidental destroyed six homes and damaged 24 others. An estimated 3,153 families were affected by the storm in the Philippines. A strong extratropical storm from the "tail" of the former typhoon struck the Philippines after Rammasun had become extratropical. The associated winds caused severe damage to buildings, and numerous trees were uprooted. The damage may have been due to a possible tornado, although this possibility is not confirmed. At least 40 people were injured and damage totaled to PHP 61 million ($1.2 million USD).

=== Japan ===
On May 12, the Japan Meteorological Agency issued warnings for the Tokyo area as Rammasun was forecast to make landfall near the city. As Rammasun became extratropical, the storm brushed the Japanese coastline on May 13, producing winds gusting up to 85 km/h (53 mph) and high waves for several hours. An estimated 10 hectares (24.7 acres) of farmland were damaged. Damage from the storm amounted to ¥770 million ($8.4 million 2008 USD) in agricultural losses.

== See also ==
- Other tropical cyclones named Rammasun
- Other tropical cyclones named Butchoy
- Typhoons in the Philippines
- Timeline of the 2008 Pacific typhoon season
