= Typhoon Neoguri (2014) =

Pacific typhoon in 2014

Typhoon Neoguri (Florita)
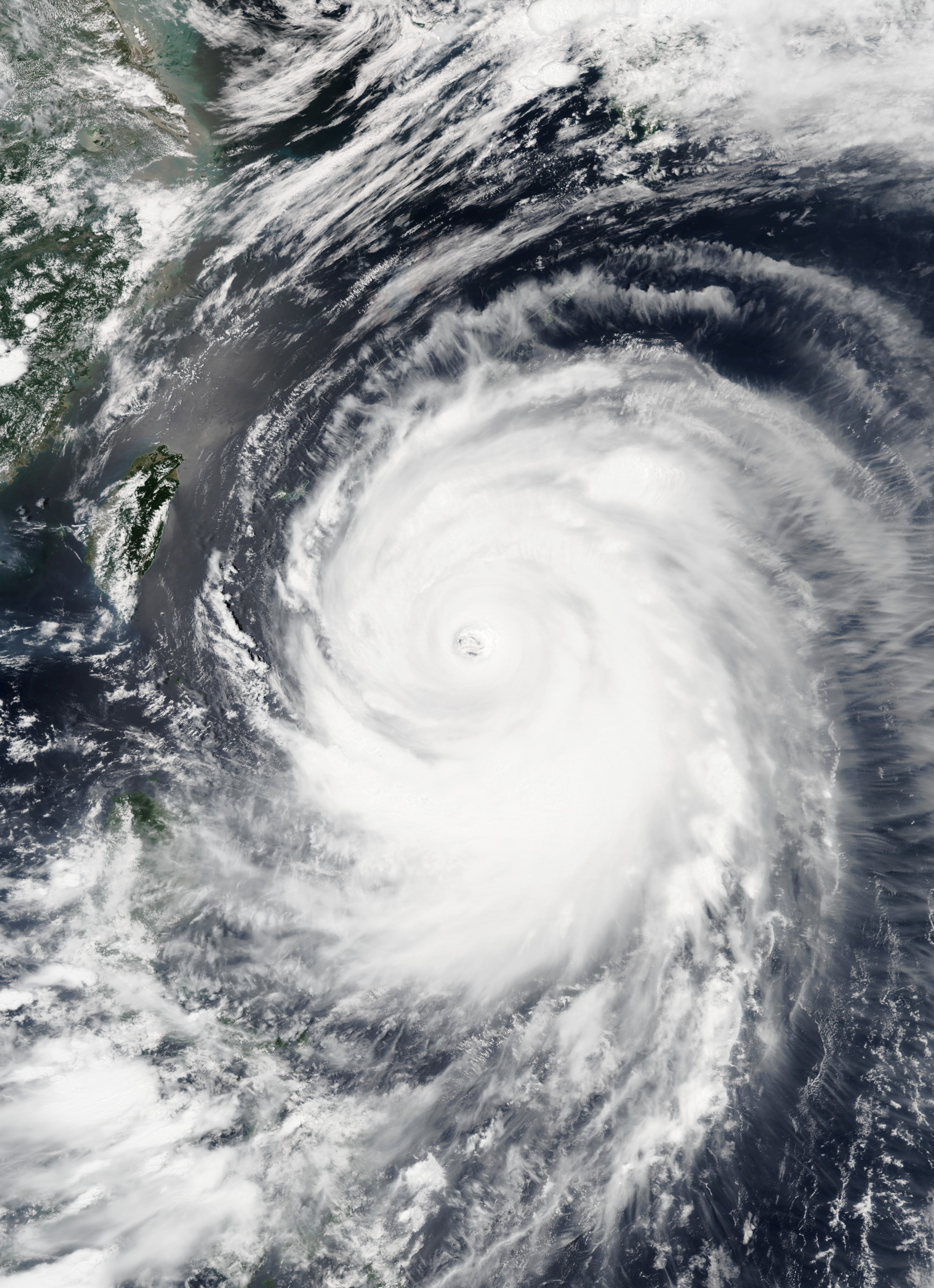
- Typhoon Neoguri shortly after peak intensity on July 7

Meteorological history
- Formed: July 2, 2014
- Extratropical: July 11, 2014
- Dissipated: July 13, 2014

Very strong typhoon
- 10-minute sustained (JMA)
- Highest winds: 185 km/h (115 mph)
- Lowest pressure: 930 hPa (mbar); 27.46 inHg

Category 5-equivalent super typhoon
- 1-minute sustained (SSHWS/JTWC)
- Highest winds: 260 km/h (160 mph)
- Lowest pressure: 918 hPa (mbar); 27.11 inHg

Overall effects
- Fatalities: 3 confirmed
- Damage: $604 million (2014 USD)
- Areas affected: Caroline Islands, Guam, Japan, South Korea
- IBTrACS
- Part of the 2014 Pacific typhoon season

Typhoon Neoguri, (Note: The name Neoguri (Korean: 너구리, [nʌ̹ɡuɾi]) was contributed by South Korea and means raccoon dog (Nyctereutes procyonoides) in Korean.) known in the Philippines as Typhoon Florita, was a large and powerful tropical cyclone which struck Japan in early July 2014. The eighth named storm and the second typhoon of the annual typhoon season, Neoguri developed into a tropical storm on July 3 and then a typhoon on July 4. It rapidly deepened on July 5, reaching peak intensity late on July 6. Neoguri began to decay on July 7 and passed through Okinawa on July 8 and then making landfall over Kyushu as a severe tropical storm late on July 9. After Neoguri passed through the southern coast of Honshū on July 10, it became extratropical on July 11.

== Meteorological history ==
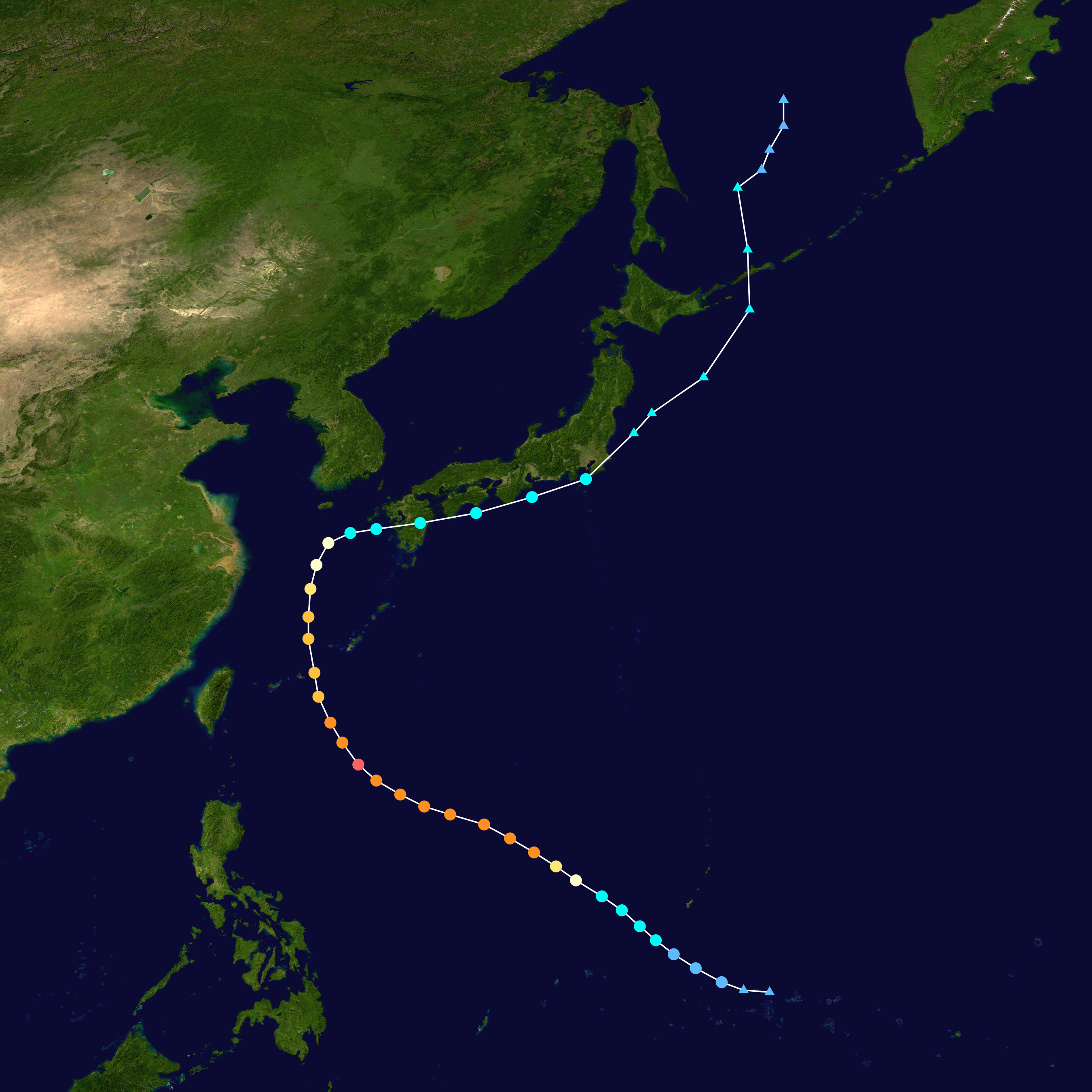
Map plotting the storm's track and intensity, according to the Saffir–Simpson scale Map key Saffir–Simpson scale Tropical depression (≤38 mph, ≤62 km/h) Tropical storm (39–73 mph, 63–118 km/h) Category 1 (74–95 mph, 119–153 km/h) Category 2 (96–110 mph, 154–177 km/h) Category 3 (111–129 mph, 178–208 km/h) Category 4 (130–156 mph, 209–251 km/h) Category 5 (≥157 mph, ≥252 km/h) Unknown Storm type Tropical cyclone Subtropical cyclone Extratropical cyclone, remnant low, tropical disturbance, or monsoon depression

Late on June 30, a tropical disturbance formed about 120 nmi (220 km; 140 mi) east of Chuuk as a broad area of trough with flaring convection, and the Japan Meteorological Agency (JMA) reported that a low-pressure area formed at the same area late on the next day. Late on July 2, JMA upgraded the system to a tropical depression, as well as the Joint Typhoon Warning Center (JTWC) issued a Tropical Cyclone Formation Alert at the same time, because of formative convective banding features under favourable environmental conditions with low vertical wind shear and good outflow. Early on July 3, JMA began to issue tropical cyclone advisories for the system. Moreover, JTWC upgraded it to a tropical depression with flaring and chaotic deep convection. Late on the same day, JTWC upgraded the system to a tropical storm and designated it as 08W for an increase in organisation of the low-level circulation centre.

The JMA upgraded the system to a tropical storm and named it Neoguri early on July 4, when a microwave imagery revealed that an eyewall was developing. At 09:00 UTC, the JMA upgraded Neoguri to a severe tropical storm, and then to a typhoon only three hours later, when the system continued tracking northwestwards along the southern periphery of a deep subtropical ridge. Late on the same day, JTWC upgraded Neoguri to a typhoon, when the system had further consolidated with an almost continuous eyewall. On July 5, Neoguri rapidly deepened and consolidated as curved banding wrapped tighter into a ragged 25 nmi (45 km; 30 mi) eye, owing to the robust all-around outflow. At noon, the Philippine Atmospheric, Geophysical and Astronomical Services Administration (PAGASA) gave it the local name Florita for entering the Philippine Area of Responsibility.

On July 6, the eye of Neoguri became highly symmetric and attained a large size with a diameter of 35 nmi (65 km; 40 mi), when the system was still tracking west-northwestwards along the southern periphery of a deep-layered subtropical ridge to the north. A microwave imagery revealed a small intense convective core and improved convective bands over the southern semi-circle, as well as the radial outflow supported the ongoing intensification. Late on the same day, JTWC upgraded Neoguri to a super typhoon for its contracted eyewall, although the secondary outer eyewall had begun to form. Simultaneously, JMA analysed that Neoguri had reached peak intensity, with ten-minute maximum sustained winds at 95 knots (175 km/h; 110 mph) and atmospheric pressure at 930 hPa (27 inHg).

Early on July 7, Neoguri began to track north-northwestwards along the southwest extension of a deep-layered subtropical ridge, when the JTWC reported that Neoguri had reached peak intensity as a Category 4 super typhoon with one-minute maximum sustained winds at 135 knots (250 km/h; 155 mph). However, this was increased to 140 knots (260 km/h; 160 mph) in the best track, an upgrade to Category 5 super typhoon status. Under the influence of a very favourable environment, the system had an expansive areal coverage as tightly curved deep convective bands, mostly feeding from the southern flank, wrapped even tighter into the expanding and nearly annular eye. However, the deep convection of the northwestern flank was almost eroded at noon, yet the round 40 nmi (75 km; 45 mi) eye maintained very well, prompting JTWC downgrading Neoguri to a typhoon late on the same day. Although a digging mid-latitude trough was amplifying the upper-level poleward outflow and helping to maintain the intensity, it increased subsidence along the northwestern quadrant of Neoguri, which significantly hindered the development and caused a weakening trend.

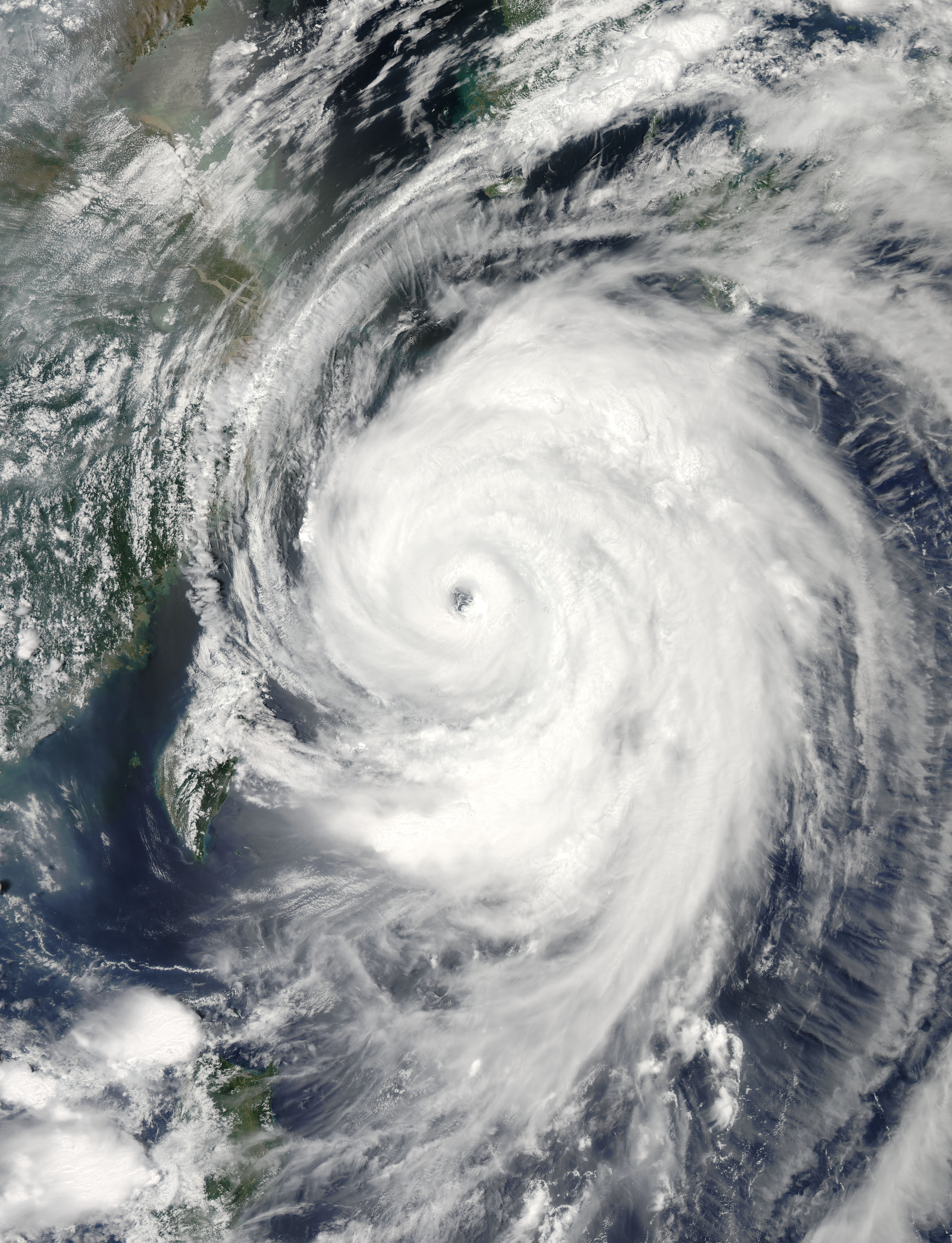
Typhoon Neoguri affecting Okinawa on July 8

From the evening to early July 8, overall convection of Neoguri significantly increased, when the typhoon began to turn northwards. Later, Neoguri passed between Miyako-jima and Okinawa Island, right before starting to weaken gradually. In the afternoon, convection of Neoguri began to diminish, as well as a noticeable dry slot formed along the eastern semi-circle. The eye became obscured late on the same day, when the interaction with mid-latitude westerly trough was increasing. Early on July 9, increasing vertical wind shear along the northwestern quadrant of Neoguri made deep convection erode very significantly. Soon, JMA downgraded the system to a severe tropical storm when sharply turning eastwards, and cold stratocumulus clouds were streaming into a defined but elongating low-level circulation centre. JTWC downgraded Neoguri to a tropical storm at noon, when the system was tracking along the periphery of the subtropical ridge modified by an approaching mid-latitude trough.

Right before 07:00 JST on July 10 (22:00 UTC on July 9), Neoguri made landfall near Akune, Kagoshima, and the system began to accelerate east-northeastwards. Convection later continued to be greatly sheared southeastwards from the low-level circulation centre which was too broad, elongated, and unravelled to pinpoint, although the poleward outflow enhanced by the strong mid-latitude westerlies continued providing ventilation to the remnant wayward convection. After Neoguri made landfall over the southern part of Wakayama Prefecture around 18:30 JST (09:30 UTC on July 10), JTWC issued the final warning to the fully exposed storm which was becoming extratropical with the forming frontal characteristics at noon, as well as JMA downgraded it to a tropical storm. Neoguri then passed through Izu Peninsula around 02:30 JST on July 11 (17:30 UTC on July 10) and made landfall over Futtsu, Chiba right before 05:00 JST (20:00 UTC on July 10).

Early on July 11, Neoguri became an extratropical cyclone east of the Kantō region and continued moving northeastwards. After passing through Iturup and turning northwards late on the same day, the storm became below gale intensity at noon on July 12. Neoguri completely dissipated in the Sea of Okhotsk one day later.

== Preparations ==
On July 8, NASA's TRMM satellite saw powerful thunderstorms reaching heights above 16.3 kilometres (10.1 mi)

On July 6, the Japan Meteorological Agency warned residents in the Ryukyu Islands that Typhoon Neoguri could be among the strongest storms to strike the country; it forecast the storm move through the Ryukyu Islands with a pressure of 910 hPa (27 inHg). The JMA compared it to Typhoon Nancy in 1961, locally called 第2室戸台風 (2nd Muroto Typhoon), which had a pressure of 925 hPa (27.3 inHg). After the agency started to monitor Neoguri under the local name of "Florita", the Philippine Atmospheric, Geophysical and Astronomical Services Administration stated that it did not expect the typhoon to directly impact any part of the Philippines; however, PAGASA did expect the typhoon to enhance the Southwest Monsoon, bringing rains to some regions of the country.

The Japanese refiner company Nansei Sekiyu KK halted operations in Okinawa for the duration of the storm.

On July 9, Japan Airlines and All Nippon Airways cancelled 40 flights collectively, affecting more than 2,000 travelers. Across Kyushu, officials urged nearly 90,000 residents to evacuate; most evacuations were in the city of Amakusa. Offshore drilling operations at JX Nippon Oil & Energy Corporation's Negishi refinery were suspended on July 8 and 9.

In Okinawa Prefecture, 580,000 people in 18 municipalities were advised to evacuate. Fourteen of these municipalities recommended evacuation for the entire area encompassed by the municipality. Local government encouraged people within these municipalities to take shelter should they feel they were in danger, and advised for them to do so in strong buildings.

== Impact ==
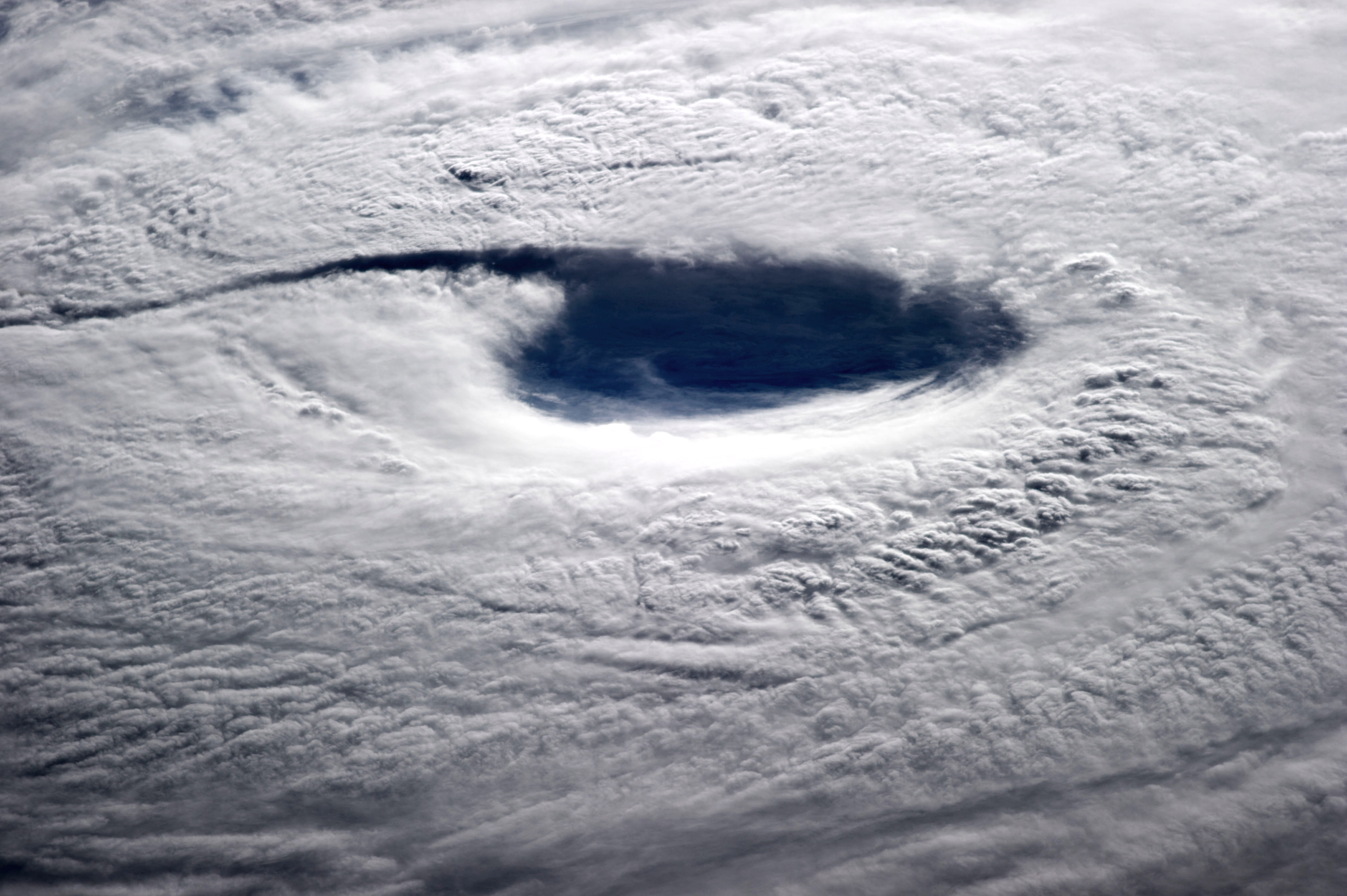
The eye of Typhoon Neoguri as seen from the International Space Station on July 7.

Throughout Japan, 3 deaths and 67 injures caused by Typhoon Neoguri were confirmed, according to the Fire and Disaster Management Agency of the Ministry of Internal Affairs and Communications of the Government of Japan. In Kōriyama, Fukushima, an 83-year-old man fell into a swollen river and died. In Nagiso, Nagano, a landslide sent mud and rock tumbling down a mountainside, killing a 12-year-old boy. A 77-year-old man in Seiyo, Ehime was found dead in a canal.

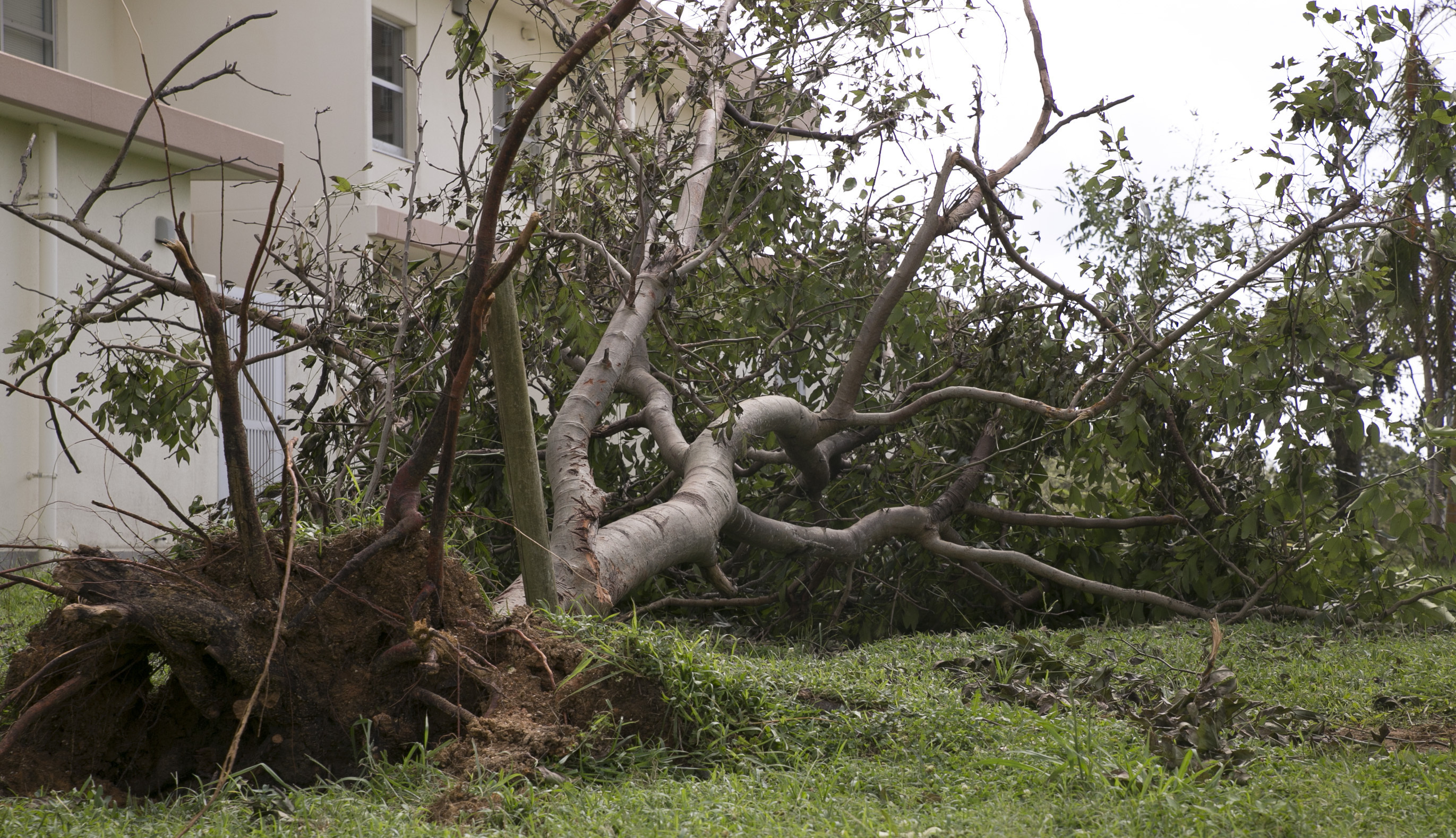
Uprooted trees in Okinawa

In the prefectures of Okinawa, Nagano, and Kagoshima, it was reported that there were approximately 10,300 power failures. Three buildings in Nagano Prefecture and Okinawa Prefecture were destroyed completely and, in the same prefectures, eight buildings were partially destroyed. Altogether, 19 buildings took damage in Okinawa Prefecture. Agricultural damage throughout Okinawa Prefecture amounted to ¥3.08 billion (US$30.3 million).

Out ahead of the storm, a man drowned off the coast of Shikoku after his vessel capsized amid large swells.

Heavy rains affected a large swath of northern Honshu, with 237.5 mm (9.35 in) falling in Nagai, Yamagata and 154 mm (6.1 in) in Kitakata, Fukushima. This resulted in widespread and prolonged flooding, especially in Yamagata Prefecture where 56 homes were inundated and evacuation orders were put in place for Shirataka. Rail service from Akayu Station was suspended due to rail line damage; repairs were expected to take until July 22. Total damage in Japan topped at ¥61.4 billion (US$604 million).

The typhoon's passage pulled a warm air mass over Japan, resulting in a widespread heat wave with temperatures across eastern Honshu and Hokkaido rose to their highest levels in 2014. Temperatures peaked at 38 °C (100 °F) in Tatebayashi while Tokyo recorded 34.2 °C (93.6 °F); measurements reached 31 °C (88 °F) in central Hokkaido. Across eight prefectures, the high temperatures resulted in 1 fatality and 152 hospitalizations for heat stroke.

Neoguri also affected the Jeju Island. Parks and schools were closed, while damage on the island were at ₩223 million (US$220,000).

== See also ==
- Weather of 2014
- Tropical cyclones in 2014
- Other tropical cyclones named Neoguri
- Other tropical cyclones named Florita
- Typhoon Maemi (2003)
- Typhoon Tokage (2004)
- Typhoon Vongfong (2014)
