= Typhoon Rammasun (2002) =

Pacific typhoon in 2002

Typhoon Rammasun (Florita)
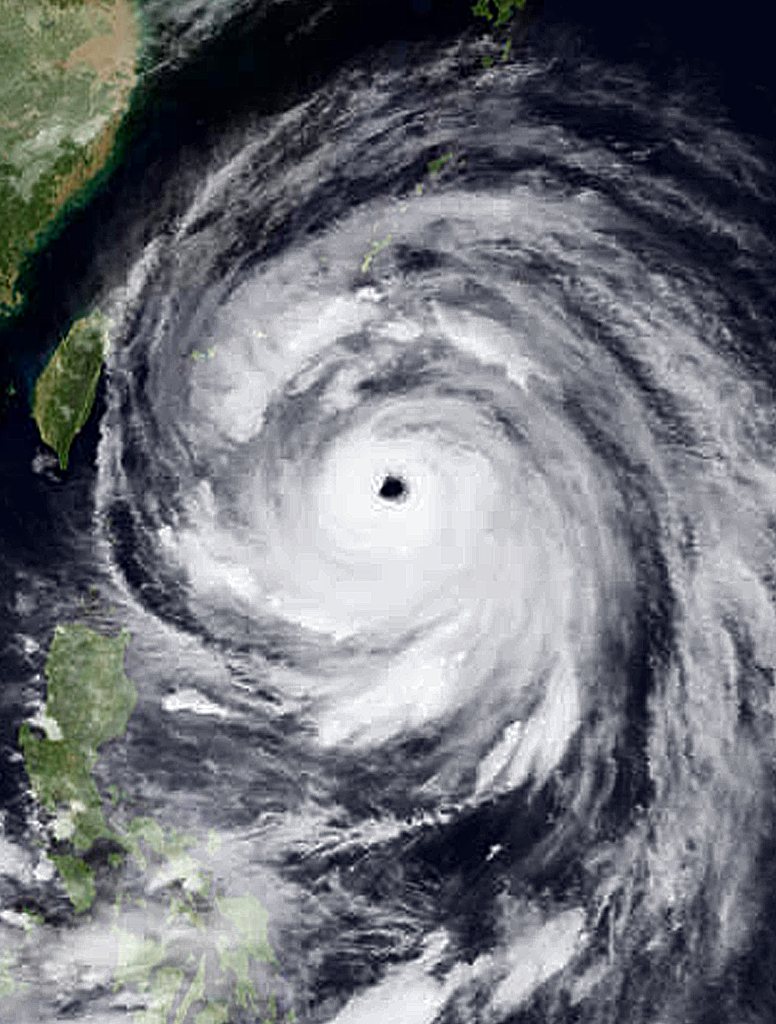
- Typhoon Rammasun near peak intensity on July 2

Meteorological history
- Formed: June 28, 2002
- Extratropical: July 8, 2002
- Dissipated: July 10, 2002

Very strong typhoon
- 10-minute sustained (JMA)
- Highest winds: 155 km/h (100 mph)
- Lowest pressure: 945 hPa (mbar); 27.91 inHg

Category 3-equivalent typhoon
- 1-minute sustained (SSHWS/JTWC)
- Highest winds: 205 km/h (125 mph)
- Lowest pressure: 933 hPa (mbar); 27.55 inHg

Overall effects
- Fatalities: 97
- Damage: $100 million (2002 USD)
- Areas affected: Philippines, Taiwan, China, Japan, South Korea, North Korea, Primorsky Krai
- IBTrACS
- Part of the 2002 Pacific typhoon season

Typhoon Rammasun, (Note: The name Rammasun (Thai: รามสูร, [raːm˧ ma˧ suːn˩˩˦]) was contributed by Thailand and refers to Ramasura, the god of thunder in Thai.) known in the Philippines as Typhoon Florita, was the first of four typhoons to contribute to heavy rainfall and deadly flooding in the Philippines in early July 2002. The fifth tropical cyclone of the 2002 Pacific typhoon season, Rammasun developed around the same time as Typhoon Chataan, only further to the west. The storm tracked northwestward toward Taiwan, and on July 2 it attained its peak intensity with winds of 155 km/h (96 mph). Rammasun turned northward, passing east of Taiwan and China. In Taiwan, the outer rainbands dropped rainfall that alleviated drought conditions. In China, the rainfall occurred after previously wet conditions, resulting in additional flooding, although damage was less than expected; there was about $85 million (Note: All damage totals are in 2002 United States dollars unless otherwise noted.) in crop and fishery damage in one province.

After affecting Taiwan and China, Rammasun began weakening due to an approaching trough, which turned the typhoon northeastward. It passed over the Japanese island of Miyako-jima and also produced strong winds in Okinawa. About 10,000 houses lost power on the island, and high surf killed two sailors. On the Japanese mainland, there was light crop damage and one serious injury. After weakening to a tropical storm, Rammasun passed just west of the South Korean island of Jeju-do, killing one person from high waves. The storm crossed the country, killing three others and leaving $9.5 million in damage. High rains also affected North Korea and Primorsky Krai in the Russian Far East.

== Meteorological history ==
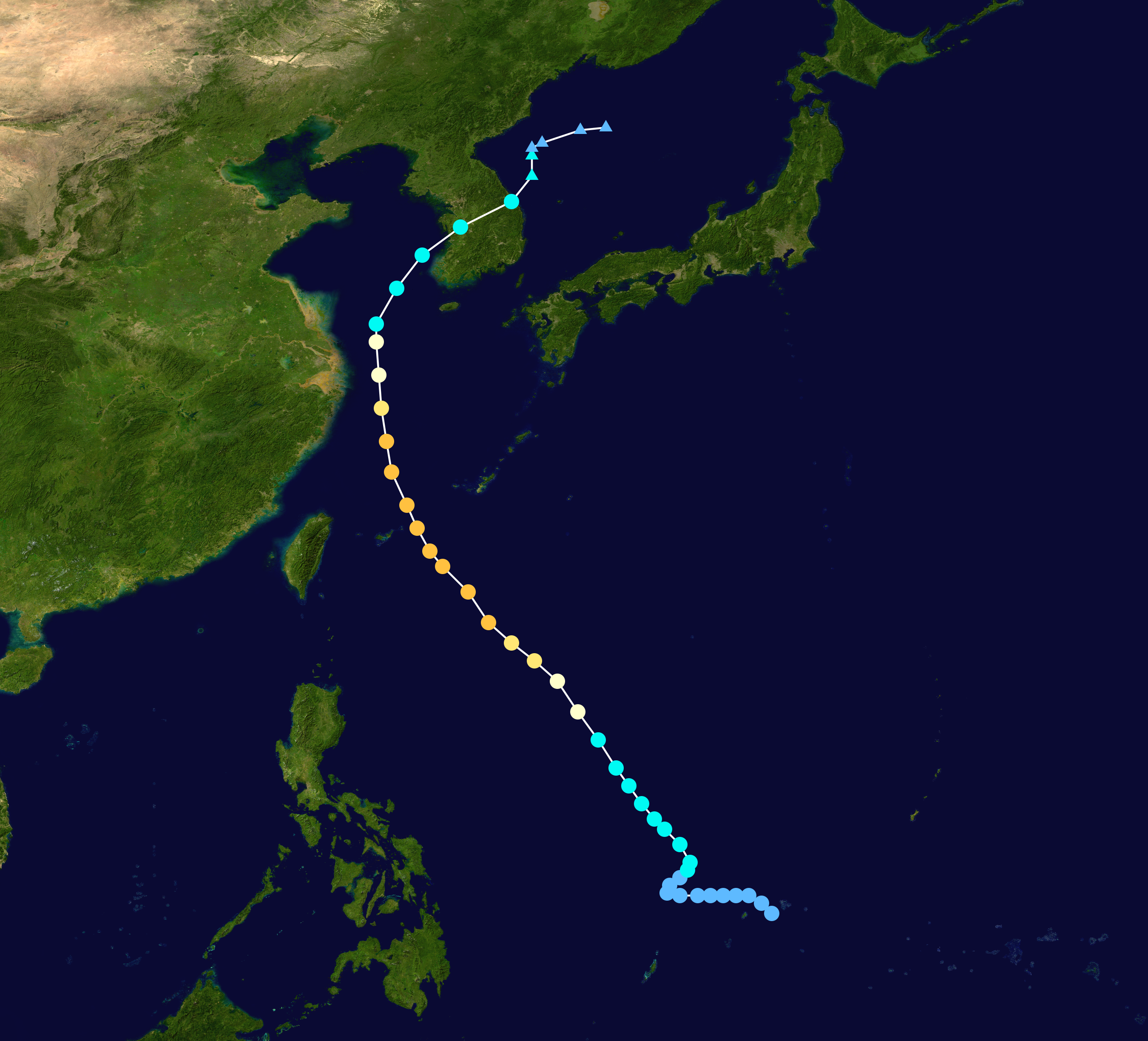
Map plotting the storm's track and intensity, according to the Saffir–Simpson scale Map key Saffir–Simpson scale Tropical depression (≤38 mph, ≤62 km/h) Tropical storm (39–73 mph, 63–118 km/h) Category 1 (74–95 mph, 119–153 km/h) Category 2 (96–110 mph, 154–177 km/h) Category 3 (111–129 mph, 178–208 km/h) Category 4 (130–156 mph, 209–251 km/h) Category 5 (≥157 mph, ≥252 km/h) Unknown Storm type Tropical cyclone Subtropical cyclone Extratropical cyclone, remnant low, tropical disturbance, or monsoon depression

Toward the end of June, the monsoon trough extended across the western North Pacific Ocean just north of the equator, spawning two tropical disturbances. The easternmost one eventually developed into Typhoon Chataan, and the western disturbance persisted to the east of Palau with an associated area of convection. The system gradually organized, developing a weak circulation after wind shear steadily decreased. Early on June 28, the Japan Meteorological Agency (JMA) (Note: The Japan Meteorological Agency is the official Regional Specialized Meteorological Center for the western Pacific Ocean.) classified the system as a tropical depression near Yap in the Federated States of Micronesia (FSM). At the same time, the Philippine Atmospheric, Geophysical and Astronomical Services Administration (PAGASA) declared the system as Tropical Depression Florita, and a few hours later the Joint Typhoon Warning Center (JTWC) (Note: The Joint Typhoon Warning Center is a joint United States Navy – United States Air Force task force that issues tropical cyclone warnings for the western Pacific Ocean and other regions.) initiated advisories on Tropical Depression 09W.

After forming, the depression tracked northwestward, influenced by a ridge to the northeast, although it briefly turned to the northeast due to an increase in westerly winds; however, its northwest motion quickly resumed. A trough over the Philippine Sea increased outflow over the depression, and the convection became better organized. Early on June 29, the JMA upgraded the depression to Tropical Storm Rammasun. While moving northwestward, the circulation initially remained broad and disorganized, located east of the cycling convection. However, Rammasun steadily intensified, and an eye developed on July 1. That day, the JMA and the JTWC upgraded the storm to a typhoon about 930 km (580 mi) east of Luzon in the Philippines. The typhoon continued strengthening, developing concentric eyewalls with well-defined rainbands. At 1500 UTC on July 2, the JMA estimated peak 10 minute sustained winds of 155 km/h (96 mph). Early on July 3, the JTWC estimated 1 minute sustained winds of 205 km/h (127 mph) about 350 km (220 mi) south-southeast of Okinawa, or 510 km (320 mi) southeast of Taiwan.

While at peak intensity, Rammasun turned northward, steered around the subtropical ridge to its east, and early on July 3 it struck the Japanese island of Miyako-jima. A stationary trough over China weakened the convection on the western periphery of the typhoon, and the eye gradually became less organized. On July 4, Rammasun began weakening, and by 0000 UTC on July 5 it was located about 280 km (170 mi) east-northeast of Shanghai as a minimal typhoon. Shortly thereafter, Rammasun weakened to tropical storm status. An approaching trough caused the storm to accelerate to the northeast, which weakened the convection and left the circulation exposed. Around 2200 UTC on July 5, Rammasun made landfall in South Korea, just south of Seosan or about 70 km (43 mi) southwest of the country's capital of Seoul. The JTWC estimated that the landfall intensity was around 65 km/h (40 mph). The storm quickly crossed the country, and although the JTWC considered Rammasun dissipated early on July 6 over the country, the JMA continued tracking the storm toward the northeast, declaring the storm extratropical at 1200 UTC that day. Early on July 8, the JMA reported that the remnants of Rammasun dissipated to the south of Vladivostok.

== Preparations and impact ==
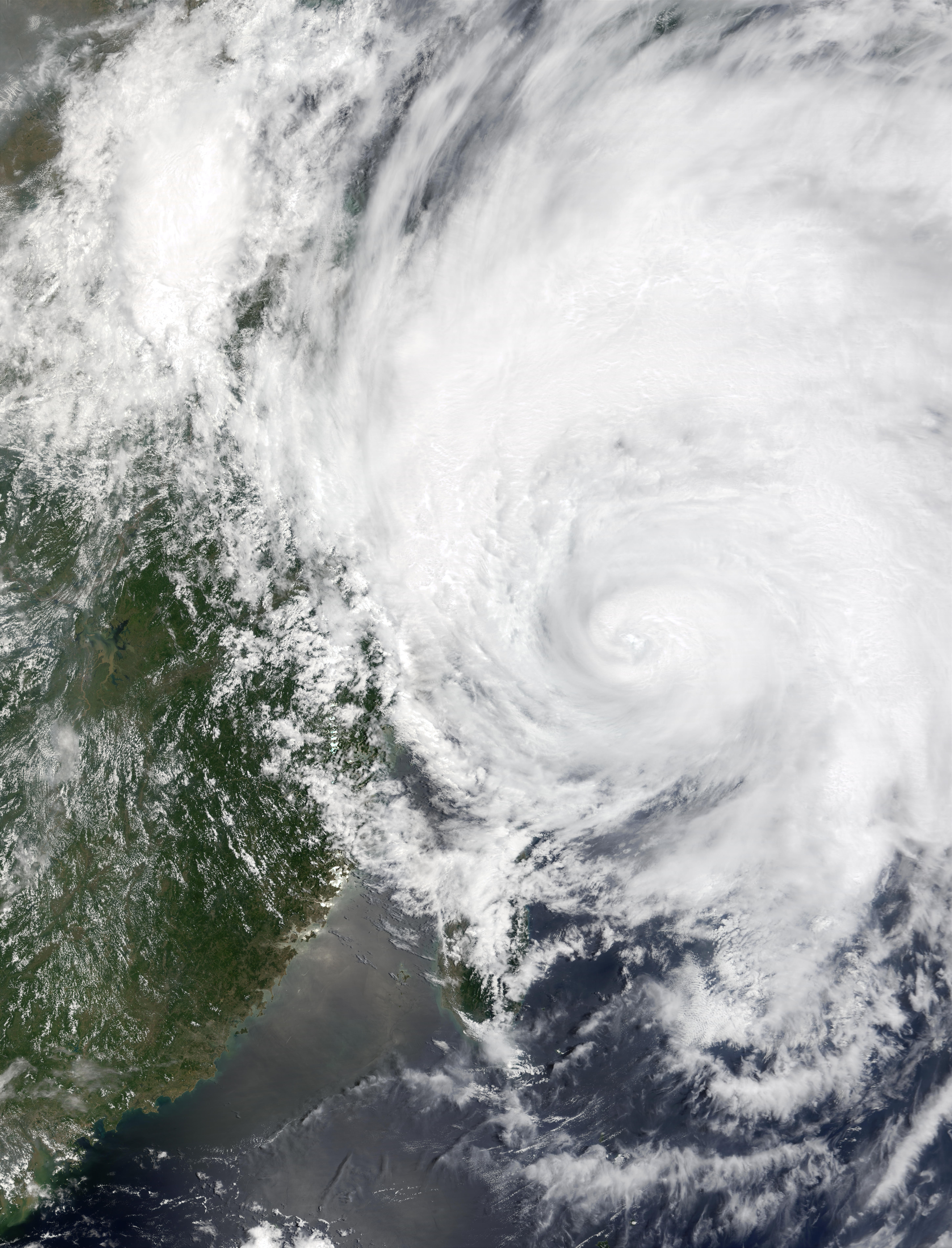
Typhoon Rammasun in the East China Sea on July 4

As Rammasun moved away from the Philippines, it enhanced the monsoon and produced rainfall and flooding. Several landslides were reported, and more than 3,000 people had to evacuate. Subsequent storms also enhanced the monsoon, and combined with the effects from Typhoon Chataan, Severe Tropical Storm Nakri, and Typhoon Halong, there were 85 deaths, with 45 people injured in the Philippines. The combined damage in the country totaled $10.3 million (₱522 million 2002 PHP). (Note: The total was originally reported in Philippine pesos. Total converted via the Oanda Corporation website.)

Before the typhoon affected Taiwan, residents in Taipei prepared sand bags, and President Chen Shui-bian ordered the military to be on standby to assist in the storm's aftermath. Taiwan's Central Weather Bureau issued an offshore typhoon warning on July 2, prompting officials to cancel ferry service and restrict water activities in Kenting National Park. After an extended drought that resulted in water restrictions for two months, the typhoon dropped rainfall across the country. In Miaoli County, Rammasun dropped 681 mm (26.8 in) of rainfall, the highest total on the island. The rains caused landslides in two villages, although damage was minor. On July 4, the water restrictions were removed island-wide, with the exception of Taipei; the city's restriction was removed a day later after determining that the Feitsui Dam and the Shihmen Dam reached levels approaching their full capacity.

In contrast to the previously dry conditions on Taiwan, eastern China was experiencing above-normal rainfall, and many reservoirs were near capacity when Rammasun was approaching the region. While paralleling the eastern coast of China, Rammasun dropped heavy rainfall that reached 225 mm (8.9 in) in Ningbo, and wind gusts peaked at 165 km/h (103 mph) in eastern Zhejiang. Officials canceled 200 flights either departing or arriving from Shanghai Pudong International Airport. High winds destroyed a migrant worker village in Shanghai, killing five people. The winds damaged a building that was under construction, injuring 44 people. A woman was killed in Chongming when winds knocked a wall onto her. Rammasun downed trees and caused power outages in the region, and storm flooding forced over 2,700 people to evacuate. High winds left about $85 million in agriculture and aquaculture damage in Zhejiang; however, damage was less than expected due to the storm remaining offshore.

Striking the Japanese island of Miyako-jima, the typhoon produced peak wind gusts of 169 km/h (105 mph) while in the eyewall, with sustained winds of 93 km/h (58 mph). Similarly strong winds were reported near Okinawa, reaching 90 km/h (56 mph). High seas from the typhoon killed two United States Navy sailors. In Okinawa, Rammasun left about 10,000 houses without power. Two people were injured in the country, one of them severely. A station in Miyazaki Prefecture on the Japanese island of Kyushu reported the highest rainfall associated with Rammasun, with a total of 290 mm (11 in). One house in the country was damaged due to the typhoon, and there was at least one report of a landslide. Crop damage in the country totaled $4.4 million (¥896 million 2002 JPY). (Note: The total was originally reported in Yen. Total converted via the Oanda Corporation website.) The threat of the storm prompted officials to cancel 61 airplane flights.

Typhoon Rammasun passed a short distance west of Jeju-do, an island offshore South Korea, dropping more than 300 mm (12 in) of rainfall. High surf killed one person on the island, and officials restricted access to Hallasan mountain and all parks. Seven boats were damaged, and many roads on the island were flooded. Before Rammasun struck the South Korean mainland, airline officials canceled 167 flights. There were three deaths on the mainland, including one boy who drowned in floodwaters. Damage in the country totaled $9.5 million, much of it property damage; there was also damage to the rice crop. Rainfall extended into neighboring North Korea, damaging rice and maize. Later, Rammasun brought the average monthly rainfall in only two days in portions of Primorsky Krai, causing flooding along roads and riverways.

== See also ==
- Other tropical cyclones named Rammasun
- Other tropical cyclones named Florita
