= Typhoon Nida (2004) =

Pacific typhoon in 2004

Typhoon Nida (Dindo)
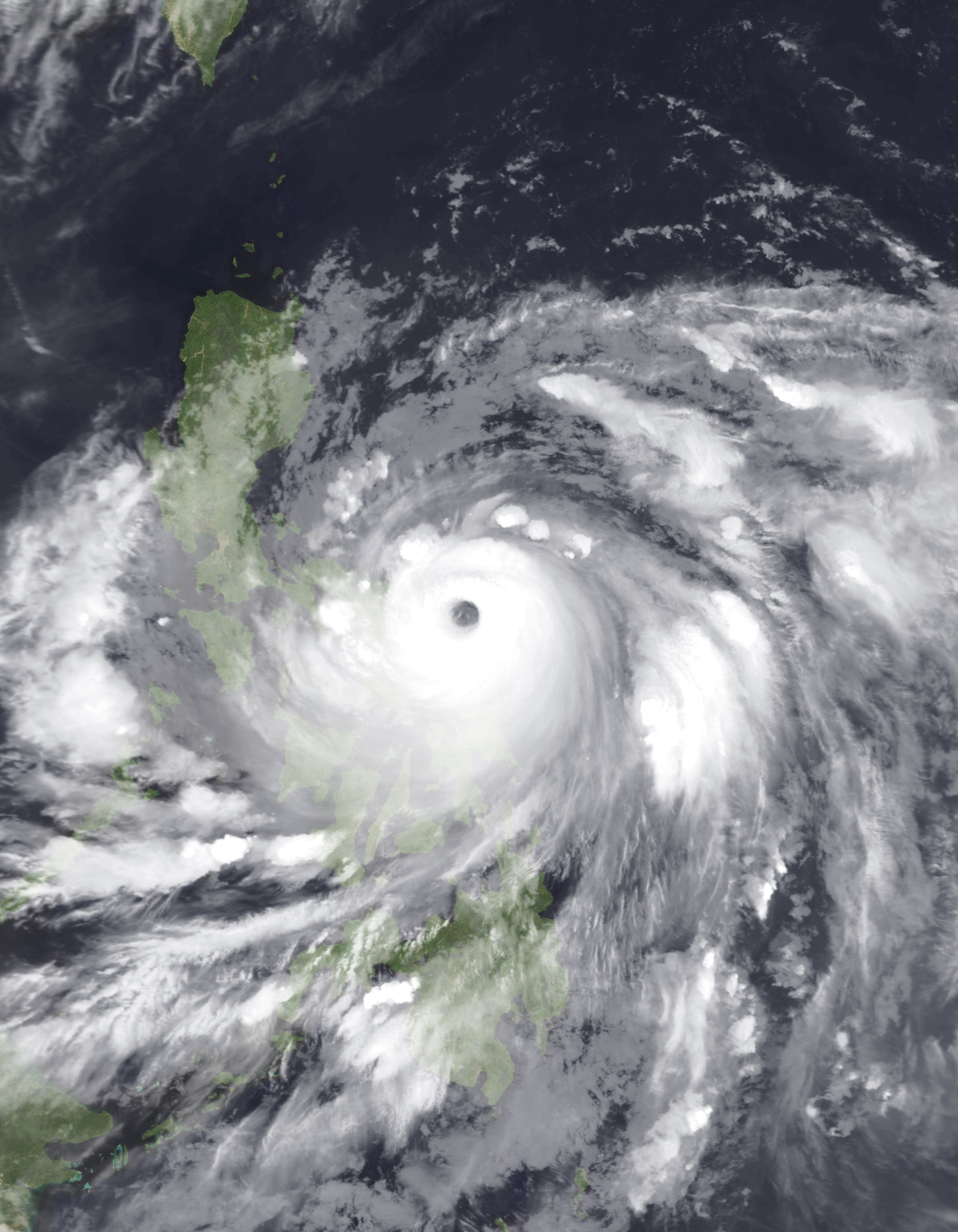
- Typhoon Nida at peak intensity on May 16

Meteorological history
- Formed: May 13, 2004
- Extratropical: May 21, 2004
- Dissipated: May 22, 2004

Very strong typhoon
- 10-minute sustained (JMA)
- Highest winds: 175 km/h (110 mph)
- Lowest pressure: 935 hPa (mbar); 27.61 inHg

Category 5-equivalent super typhoon
- 1-minute sustained (SSHWS/JTWC)
- Highest winds: 260 km/h (160 mph)
- Lowest pressure: 898 hPa (mbar); 26.52 inHg

Overall effects
- Fatalities: 31 direct
- Damage: $1.3 million (2004 USD)
- Areas affected: Philippines and Japan
- IBTrACS
- Part of the 2004 Pacific typhoon season

Typhoon Nida, (Note: The name Nida (Thai: นิดา, [ni˦˥(ʔ) daː˧]) was contributed by Thailand and is a feminine given name in Thai.) known in the Philippines as Typhoon Dindo, was the fourth tropical cyclone and second named storm of the 2004 Pacific typhoon season. Nida was the second super typhoon of the 2004 season, reaching a peak intensity of 160 miles per hour (260 km/h). Forming southeast of the Philippines, the storm strengthened as it moved northwest. The typhoon brushed the eastern Philippines causing heavy rains across the island archipelago. Nida later accelerated northeast, missing Japan to the east while becoming an extratropical cyclone. A total of $1.3 million (2004 USD) in damage occurred, and Nida left 31 fatalities.

== Meteorological history ==
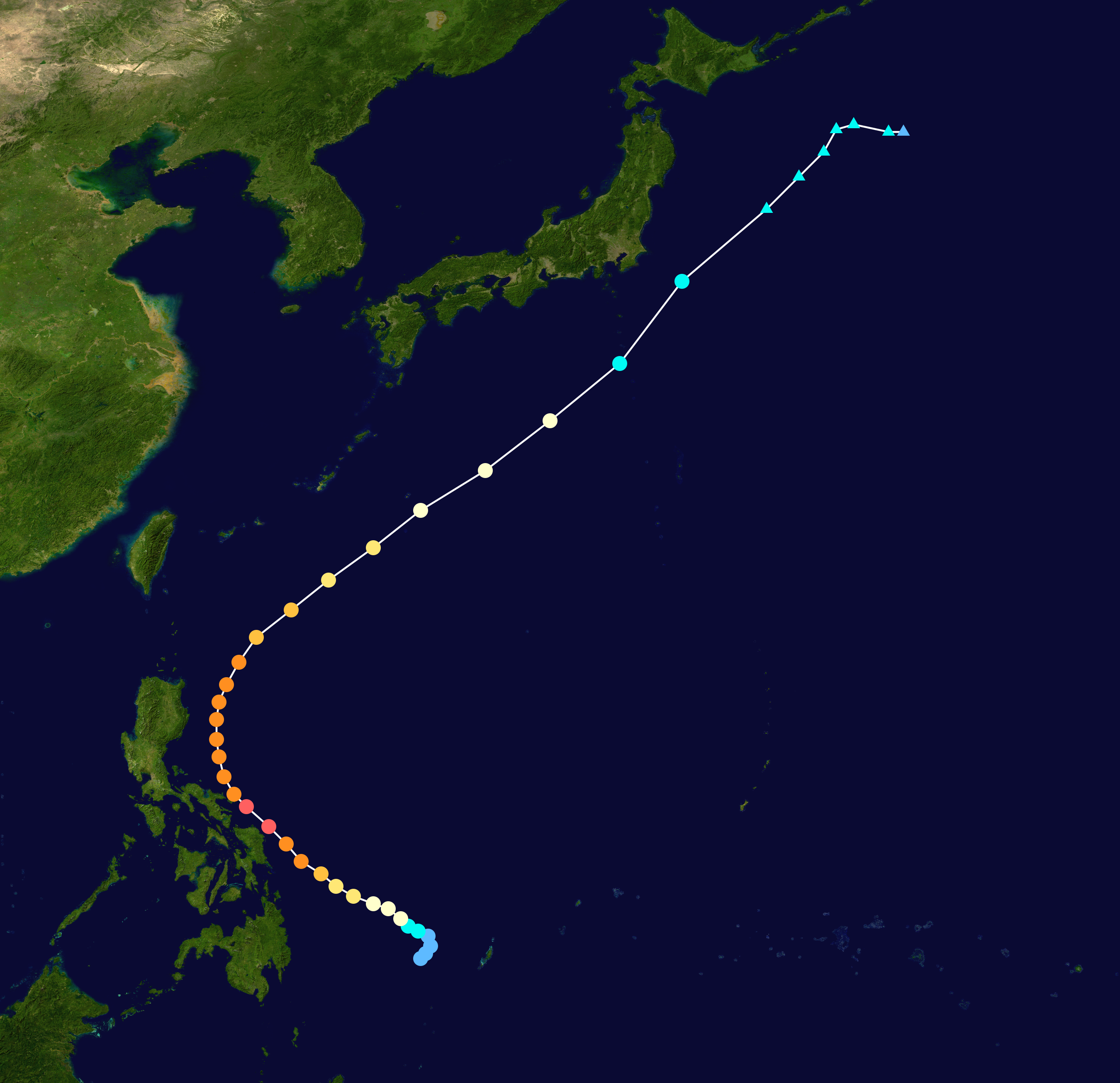
Map plotting the storm's track and intensity, according to the Saffir–Simpson scale Map key Saffir–Simpson scale Tropical depression (≤38 mph, ≤62 km/h) Tropical storm (39–73 mph, 63–118 km/h) Category 1 (74–95 mph, 119–153 km/h) Category 2 (96–110 mph, 154–177 km/h) Category 3 (111–129 mph, 178–208 km/h) Category 4 (130–156 mph, 209–251 km/h) Category 5 (≥157 mph, ≥252 km/h) Unknown Storm type Tropical cyclone Subtropical cyclone Extratropical cyclone, remnant low, tropical disturbance, or monsoon depression

On May 12, a persistent area of thunderstorms formed within a monsoon trough 220 miles (350 km) southwest of Palau. Satellite imagery revealed a weak low-level circulation. Initially, the Joint Typhoon Warning Center (JTWC) forecast the storm to not strengthen. The following day, forecasters saw that the storm was strengthening and upgraded the system to tropical depression status. Forecasters at the Philippine Atmospheric, Geophysical and Astronomical Services Administration designated the storm as Tropical Depression Dindo.

At the time of formation, the depression was located 190 miles (310 km) east of Palau as it moved west northwest at 3 mph (4.8 km/h). Quickscat satellite imagery showed the depression's winds were near 29 mph (47 km/h) and increasing. Satellite imagery later the showed deep convection organizing over the low-level circulation. The depression underwent rapid intensification as it became a tropical storm late in the morning on May 14 and was assigned the name Nida by the Japan Meteorological Agency (JMA). Still intensifying, the storm turned northwest where it reached typhoon status later that night.

Curving west-northwest at 7 mph (11 km/h), Typhoon Nida attained winds of 115 mph (185 km/h), equivalent to a Category 3 hurricane. On May 16, Nida became a super typhoon as its winds reached 165 mph (266 km/h). At its peak, its highest winds extended 35 miles (56 km) from the center. Satellite imagery showed the storm developed a defined eye measuring 25 miles (40 km) wide. On May 17, the center of Nida passed over Catanduanes Island, Philippines.

After making landfall, Nida weakened and then turned more northward and slowed down. Re-entering the warmer waters of the Western Pacific Ocean, Nida's winds restrengthened to 150 mph (240 km/h). During the night of May 18, the typhoon began to weaken. Infrared satellite imagery showed the eye being obscured by high cirrostratus clouds, indicative of the weakening typhoon. The eyewall became significantly disorganized as Nida continued to recurve to the northeast.

Nida accelerated northeast and its maximum sustained winds weakened to 90 mph (140 km/h). Interacting with an upper level low pressure system over Japan, the typhoon became elongated. Nida weakened below typhoon strength as the center passed 290 miles (470 km) south of Tokyo, Japan. By May 21, Nida transitioned to an extratropical cyclone. The JMA continued to track the remnants of Nida as it weakened northeast of northern Japan.

== Preparations and impact ==
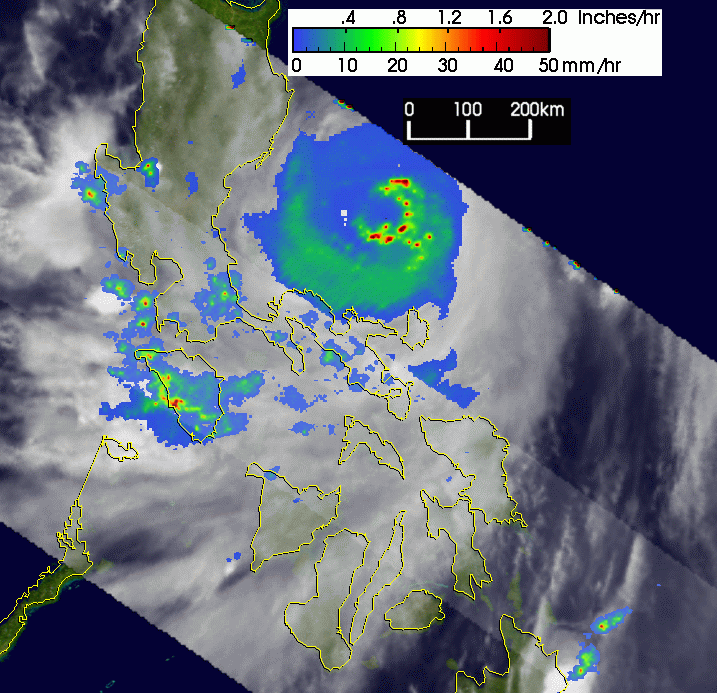
TRMM satellite image of Typhoon Nida on May 17, 2004

In the Philippines, evacuation centers were opened to accommodate 2,986 people. The typhoon approach cancelled ferry operations stranding 15,057 passengers. In Taiwan, forecasters at the Central Weather Bureau issued a typhoon warning as forecast models predicted a high probability of the typhoon hitting Taiwan. The warnings interrupted the preparations for the inauguration of President Chen Shui-bian.

In the Philippines, winds were clocked at 100 knots (190 km/h) at Virac. on Catanduanes Island at 6 a.m. local time on May 17. The pressure at that location fell to 965 millibars (28.5 inHg). Structural damage was severe as the typhoon damaged or destroyed over 700–4,000 homes displacing 11,000 people. In Guimba, Nueva Ecija, Nida spawned a tornado that caused moderate damage. After the storm, President Gloria Macapagal Arroyo placed eight provinces under a state of emergency.

Nida produced heavy rainfall across the eastern Philippines. Rainfall up to 10.6 inches (270 mm) was reported in Ombao while Naga City received 5.9 inches (150 mm) of rain. The rest of the Philippines received 104 to 372 millimetres (4.1 to 14.6 in) of rain. 31 fatalities (20 confirmed, 11 unaccounted for) were reported during Nida's landfall. In Camotes island, nine people drowned and five were declared missing when a ferry boat sank during the storm. Elsewhere offshore, 13 crewmen were rescued when their ship ran aground near Luzon. In all, the typhoon left $1.3 million in damage across the eastern Philippines.

In Japan, heavy rains produced by the outer bands of Nida triggered flash flooding and landslides in Fukushima Prefecture. Several highways were shut down due to rising waters or debris and a few homes also were inundated. In Mito, Ibaraki, 360 homes were left without power after high winds knocked down electrical wires. A 10 m (33 ft) section of highway in the city also collapsed. In addition to the structural damage caused by Nida, the poor weather conditions created during its passage resulted in several canceled flights by Japan Air Commuter. In Minamidaitō, Okinawa, a weather station operated by the WMO reported winds gusting to 71 mph (114 km/h) and a barometric pressure of 972 millibars (28.7 inHg). Rainfall total at the station was 1.25 inches (32 mm) with the highest at 2.79 inches (71 mm). There were no reports of damage.

== See also ==
- Other tropical cyclones named Nida
- Other tropical cyclones named Dindo
- Typhoon Noul (2015)
