= List of storms named Florita =

The name Florita has been used for six tropical cyclones in the Philippine Area of Responsibility by PAGASA in the Western Pacific Ocean.

- Typhoon Rammasun (2002) (T0205, 09W, Florita) – struck South Korea.
- Severe Tropical Storm Bilis (2006) (T0604, 05W, Florita) – struck Taiwan and China.
- Severe Tropical Storm Lionrock (2010) (T1006, 07W, Florita) – made landfall on the east coast of Guangdong Province, China.
- Typhoon Neoguri (2014) (T1408, 08W, Florita) – a large and powerful tropical cyclone which struck Japan in 2014.
- Typhoon Prapiroon (2018) (T1807, 09W, Florita) – a Category 1 typhoon that worsened the floods in Japan.
- Severe Tropical Storm Ma-on (2022) (T2209, 10W, Florita) – struck the northern Philippines, South China and northern Vietnam.

The name Florita was retired following the 2022 Pacific typhoon season and was replaced with Francisco.
