= Typhoon Ida (1945) =

Pacific typhoon in 1945

Typhoon Ida Makurazaki Typhoon
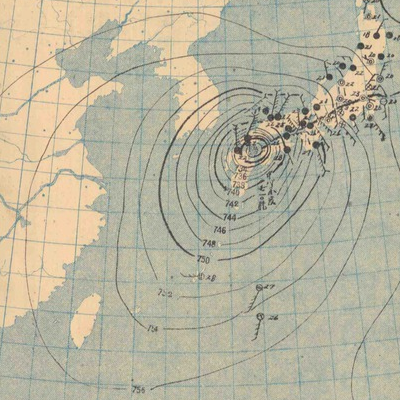

Meteorological history
- Formed: September 10, 1945
- Dissipated: September 20, 1945

Category 1-equivalent typhoon
- 1-minute sustained (SSHWS)
- Highest winds: 130 km/h (80 mph)
- Lowest pressure: 917 hPa (mbar); 27.08 inHg

Overall effects
- Fatalities: 2,473
- Missing: 1,283
- Areas affected: Japan, China, Russia Far East, Kuril Islands, Guam
- IBTrACS
- Part of the 1945 Pacific typhoon season

Typhoon Ida, known in Japan as Makurazaki Typhoon (枕崎台風), was a powerful and very deadly typhoon that formed over the western Pacific Ocean and struck Japan in September 1945, shortly after the Japanese surrender in World War II, causing over 2,000 deaths. The storm struck parts of Kyushu and Ryukyu which had already been ravaged by the war and compounded the effects of the atomic bombing of Hiroshima, which had occurred only one month prior, resulting in further devastation to the already destroyed city. The typhoon likely had much higher wind speeds than were recorded at the time, with current estimates of the storm's minimum pressure as low as 917 millibars, though meteorologists are uncertain of the storm's true intensity. The typhoon remains one of the deadliest in Japanese history and is one of only a few storms to be known by a separate name in Japanese.

== Meteorological history ==
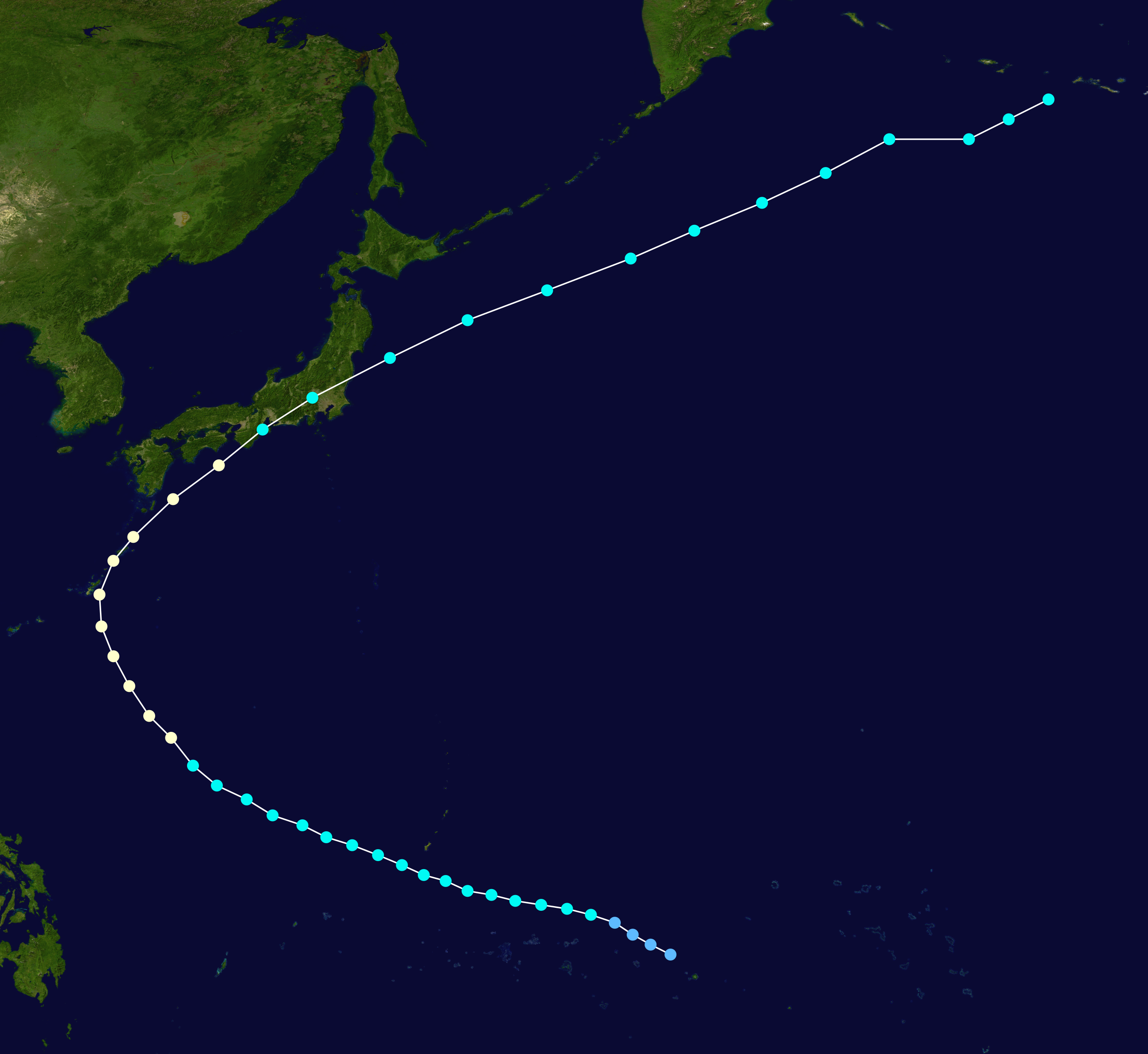
Map plotting the storm's track and intensity, according to the Saffir–Simpson scale Map key Saffir–Simpson scale Tropical depression (≤38 mph, ≤62 km/h) Tropical storm (39–73 mph, 63–118 km/h) Category 1 (74–95 mph, 119–153 km/h) Category 2 (96–110 mph, 154–177 km/h) Category 3 (111–129 mph, 178–208 km/h) Category 4 (130–156 mph, 209–251 km/h) Category 5 (≥157 mph, ≥252 km/h) Unknown Storm type Tropical cyclone Subtropical cyclone Extratropical cyclone, remnant low, tropical disturbance, or monsoon depression

A tropical depression formed in the West Pacific on September 10 and intensified before being designated as Typhoon Ida. Ida continued to slowly move westwards, and after beginning to curve north rapidly intensified into a powerful typhoon. The storm made landfall near Makurazaki in Kagoshima Prefecture on the Japanese mainland on September 17. Ida was at the time the strongest typhoon to hit Kyushu on record, with a minimum sea-level pressure of 916.1 hPa (27.05 inHg) and a maximum wind gust of 62.7 metres per second (140 mph), which was recorded at a weather station in Makurazaki. This reading makes the storm responsible for the second-lowest atmospheric pressure ever recorded in mainland Japan, after the 1934 Muroto typhoon. After passing over Japan, Ida turned northeast and weakened, eventually becoming extratropical and dissipating near the western Aleutian Islands on September 20.

== Impact and aftermath ==
Significant typhoons with special names (from the Japan Meteorological Agency)
Name	Number	Japanese name
Ida	T4518	Makurazaki Typhoon (枕崎台風)
Louise	T4523	Akune Typhoon (阿久根台風)
Marie	T5415	Tōya Maru Typhoon (洞爺丸台風)
Ida	T5822	Kanogawa Typhoon (狩野川台風)
Sarah	T5914	Miyakojima Typhoon (宮古島台風)
Vera	T5915	Isewan Typhoon (伊勢湾台風)
Nancy	T6118	2nd Muroto Typhoon (第2室戸台風)
Cora	T6618	2nd Miyakojima Typhoon (第2宮古島台風)
Della	T6816	3rd Miyakojima Typhoon (第3宮古島台風)
Babe	T7709	Okinoerabu Typhoon (沖永良部台風)
Faxai	T1915	Reiwa 1 Bōsō Peninsula Typhoon (令和元年房総半島台風)
Hagibis	T1919	Reiwa 1 East Japan Typhoon (令和元年東日本台風)

More than 2,000 people were killed in the Hiroshima Prefecture after heavy rains brought by a weakening Ida caused severe landslides. The storm occurred just days after the Empire of Japan surrendered to the Allies in the Pacific War, formally ending World War II, and the damage caused by Ida worsened the situation in the already war-ravaged country.

In addition, the storm affected many ships of the United States Navy's Pacific Fleet. USS Repose (AH-16) reportedly entered Ida's eye and observed an atmospheric pressure of 25.55 inches of mercury (about 865 hPa). This is below the official world record for minimum sea-level pressure (870 hPa) recorded during Typhoon Tip in 1979, although Repose's data is not confirmed.
