= Typhoon Babe (1977) =

Pacific typhoon in 1977

Typhoon Babe (Miling) Okinoerabu Typhoon
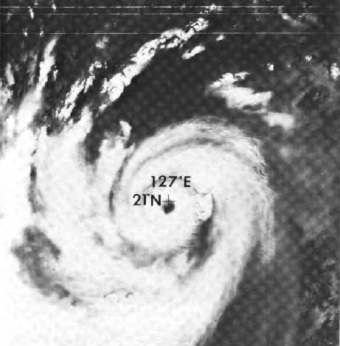
- Typhoon Babe at peak intensity on September 8

Meteorological history
- Formed: September 2, 1977
- Dissipated: September 12, 1977

Violent typhoon
- 10-minute sustained (JMA)
- Highest winds: 205 km/h (125 mph)
- Lowest pressure: 905 hPa (mbar); 26.72 inHg

Category 4-equivalent super typhoon
- 1-minute sustained (SSHWS/JTWC)
- Highest winds: 240 km/h (150 mph)
- Lowest pressure: 906 hPa (mbar); 26.75 inHg

Overall effects
- Fatalities: 23 total
- Missing: 3
- Damage: $23 million (1977 USD)
- Areas affected: Japan, East China Sea, China
- IBTrACS
- Part of the 1977 Pacific typhoon season

Typhoon Babe, known in Japan as Okinoerabu Typhoon (沖永良部台風, Okinoerabu Taifū), and in the Philippines as Super Typhoon Miling, was regarded as "the worst typhoon to threaten Japan in 18 years." Developing as a tropical depression on September 2, Babe initially tracked west-northwestward as it intensified. On September 5, an abrupt shift in steering currents caused the system to turn north-northwestward. Early on September 6, the system intensified into a typhoon. Over the following two days, Babe quickly intensified, ultimately attaining its peak intensity early on September 8 with winds of 240 km/h (150 mph) and a barometric pressure of 905 mbar (hPa; 26.72 inHg). Not long after reaching this strength, another shift in the steering patterns caused the typhoon to execute a prolonged counter-clockwise arc, causing it to track through the Ryukyu Islands southwest of Japan, as it interacted with a low pressure originating from the Korean Peninsula. During this time, the system gradually weakened and eventually it made landfall near Shanghai, China on September 11 as a minimal typhoon before dissipating inland the following day. Coincidentally, Typhoon Babe and Atlantic Hurricane Babe existed at the same time from September 3–9.

Passing through the Ryukyu Islands as a powerful typhoon, Babe caused considerable damage in the region. More than 1,000 homes were destroyed and nearly 7,000 more were damaged or flooded. One person was killed on Amami Ōshima and 77 others were injured throughout the country. Total losses reached ¥6.1 billion (US$23 million). Offshore, over 100 vessels were affected by the storm, including a Panamanian freighter where 13 people died. In China, more than 24,000 homes were destroyed and nine people were killed.

== Meteorological history ==
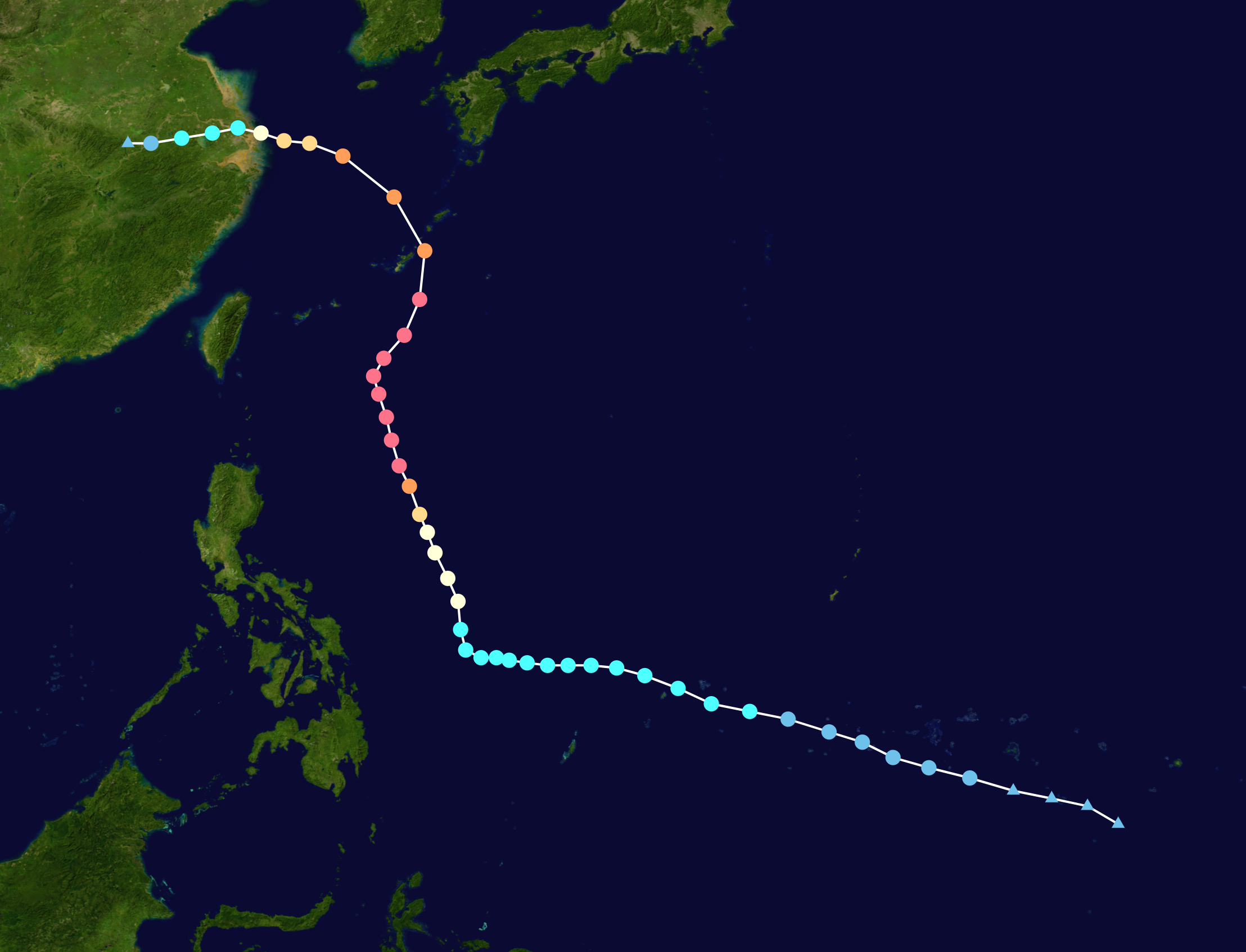
Map plotting the storm's track and intensity, according to the Saffir–Simpson scale Map key Saffir–Simpson scale Tropical depression (≤38 mph, ≤62 km/h) Tropical storm (39–73 mph, 63–118 km/h) Category 1 (74–95 mph, 119–153 km/h) Category 2 (96–110 mph, 154–177 km/h) Category 3 (111–129 mph, 178–208 km/h) Category 4 (130–156 mph, 209–251 km/h) Category 5 (≥157 mph, ≥252 km/h) Unknown Storm type Tropical cyclone Subtropical cyclone Extratropical cyclone, remnant low, tropical disturbance, or monsoon depression

In late August 1977, an area of disturbed weather was noted south of Pohnpei. By September 1, a weak surface low accompanied by organized convection developed within the disturbance. Situated to the south of a tropical upper tropospheric trough, conditions were favorable for further organization and the Joint Typhoon Warning Center (JTWC) issued a Tropical Cyclone Formation Alert for the system. Tracking steadily west-northwestward in response to a well-developed subtropical ridge extending from the International Date Line to China, the system was soon classified a tropical depression early on September 2. Hours later, a weather reconnaissance mission into the depression revealed winds of 75 km/h (47 mph), prompting the JTWC to designate the system as Tropical Storm Babe. Due to the cyclone's proximity to the Philippines, the Philippine Atmospheric, Geophysical and Astronomical Services Administration (PAGASA) also monitored the storm and assigned it with the local name Miling.

Initially, forecasters anticipated Babe to maintain its westward course as it strengthened and threaten the Philippines; however, its forward motion gradually slowed as it neared the region. On September 5, an upper-level trough formed over northeastern Asia and created a weakness in the subtropical ridge, allowing Babe to turn north-northwestward. Over the following two days, the storm quickly strengthened as divergence increased ahead of the storm, with Babe attaining typhoon status early on September 6 Between 0832 UTC on September 5 and 2204 UTC on September 7, the storm's barometric pressure dropped from 988 mbar (hPa; 29.18 inHg) to 907 mbar (hPa; 26.78 inHg), approximately 1.3 mbar (hPa; 0.04 inHg) per hour. Early on September 8, Babe attained its peak intensity with winds of 240 km/h (150 mph) while situated approximately 465 km (289 mi) southeast of Ishigaki Island. This ranked it as the first and only super typhoon of the 1977 season. At this time, the Japan Meteorological Agency estimated the storm to have had peak ten-minute sustained winds of 205 km/h (127 mph) and a minimum pressure of 905 mbar (hPa; 26.72 inHg).

Until September 8, Babe was forecast to continue northwestward into Taiwan and later China; however, another upper-level trough moved into northeastern China and further weakened the ridge. This in turn allowed a new area of low pressure to develop over the Korean Peninsula and cause Babe to curve northeastward. While moving northeastward, Babe gradually weakened and began to undergo a Fujiwhara-like interaction with the low near Korea as that system moved southwestward. Accelerating along a counter-clockwise arc, Babe moved through the Ryukyu Islands as a weakening typhoon on September 9 before taking a steady westward course into China. As the system passed through the archipelago, a pressure of 907.3 mbar (hPa; 0.089 inHg) was measured on Okinoerabujima. Babe eventually made landfall near Shanghai with winds of 120 km/h (75 mph) before rapidly weakening over land. The system was last noted early on September 12 over Anhui Province.

== Impact ==
Significant typhoons with special names (from the Japan Meteorological Agency)
Name	Number	Japanese name
Ida	T4518	Makurazaki Typhoon (枕崎台風)
Louise	T4523	Akune Typhoon (阿久根台風)
Marie	T5415	Tōya Maru Typhoon (洞爺丸台風)
Ida	T5822	Kanogawa Typhoon (狩野川台風)
Sarah	T5914	Miyakojima Typhoon (宮古島台風)
Vera	T5915	Isewan Typhoon (伊勢湾台風)
Nancy	T6118	2nd Muroto Typhoon (第2室戸台風)
Cora	T6618	2nd Miyakojima Typhoon (第2宮古島台風)
Della	T6816	3rd Miyakojima Typhoon (第3宮古島台風)
Babe	T7709	Okinoerabu Typhoon (沖永良部台風)
Faxai	T1915	Reiwa 1 Bōsō Peninsula Typhoon (令和元年房総半島台風)
Hagibis	T1919	Reiwa 1 East Japan Typhoon (令和元年東日本台風)

Torrential rain fell across much of the Ryukyu Islands, Shikoku, and Kyushu. The highest total were observed in Kōchi Prefecture, with Funato in Tsuno, Kōchi measuring 705 mm (27.8 in). The small island of Okinoerabujima reportedly experienced winds in excess of 210 km/h (130 mph) for two hours as the typhoon passed by. Nearly two-thirds of the homes across the island were damaged or destroyed by the storm and 73 people were injured. Most of the injuries across the island were caused by collapsing buildings. One person was killed on Amami Ōshima and 77 others were injured across the Amami Islands. According to Japanese police, 1,146 homes were destroyed, mainly by flooding and landslides, while 1,097 more were damaged and another 5,826 were flooded. At least 14,927 people were left homeless. Losses across the country amounted to ¥6.1 billion (US$23 million).

About 420 km (260 mi) north-northwest of Okinawa, the Panamanian freighter May Cruiser became stranded and in danger of sinking on September 10 with its crew of 25. The Japanese Maritime Safety Agency deployed five airplanes and four patrol boats to search for survivors. Additionally, ten Japanese fishing boats in the area assisted in search and rescue. By September 12, rescuers found nine sailors and thirteen bodies, while three others remained missing. Elsewhere in the East China Sea, approximately 100 Japanese fishing vessels attempting to seek shelter from the storm were damaged.

In China, wind gusts reportedly reached 252 km/h (157 mph), resulting in extensive damage. Around 24,000 homes were destroyed and nine people were killed.

== See also ==
- Other tropical cyclones named Babe
- List of violent typhoons
