= Typhoon Sarah (1959) =

Pacific typhoon in 1959

Typhoon Sarah Miyakojima Typhoon
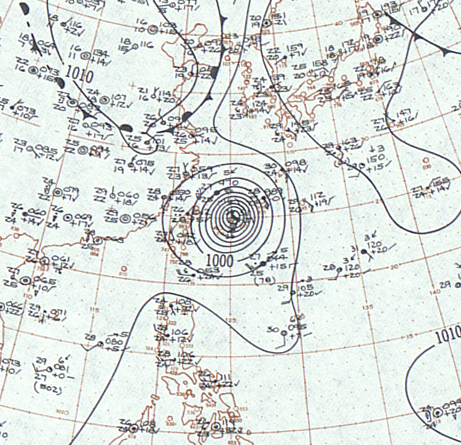
- Surface weather analysis of Typhoon Sarah on September 15

Meteorological history
- Formed: September 11, 1959
- Extratropical: September 19, 1959
- Dissipated: September 23, 1959

Violent typhoon
- 10-minute sustained (JMA)
- Lowest pressure: 905 hPa (mbar); 26.72 inHg

Category 5-equivalent super typhoon
- 1-minute sustained (SSHWS/JTWC)
- Highest winds: 305 km/h (190 mph)
- Lowest pressure: 905 hPa (mbar); 26.72 inHg

Overall effects
- Fatalities: 2,354 total
- Damage: $102 million (1959 USD)
- Areas affected: Japan, South Korea, Soviet Union
- IBTrACS
- Part of the 1959 Pacific typhoon season

Typhoon Sarah, known as the Miyakojima Typhoon in Japan, was a destructive typhoon which was one of the strongest storms on record to strike South Korea and Russia. It formed during the peak of the busy 1959 Pacific typhoon season near Guam, and moved generally to the west-northwest. Continued observations from the hurricane hunters allowed the Joint Typhoon Warning Center (JTWC) to track Sarah from its origins to its peak as a powerful typhoon, with maximum sustained winds estimated at 305 km/h (190 mph) on September 15. Shortly thereafter, the typhoon struck the small Japanese island of Miyako-jima, where the barometric pressure fell to 908.1 mbar (26.82 inHg), the second-lowest on record for the country. Sarah turned to the north and northeast, weakening from its peak intensity. On September 17, the typhoon made landfall just west of Busan, South Korea with winds of 185 km/h (115 mph), the nation's strongest landfall at the time and only to be surpassed by Typhoon Maemi in 2003. Sarah later became extratropical over the Japanese island of Hokkaido on September 18, although the remnants persisted for several days, crossing into the Russian Far East and later dissipating on September 23.

On Miyako-jima, Sarah damaged all of the crops and destroyed about 6,000 houses. Damage was estimated at $2 million, (Note: All damage totals are in 1959 United States dollars) and there were seven deaths. The damage prompted the Japan Meteorological Agency to give Sarah the special name of the "Miyakojima Typhoon". However, the effects were worst in South Korea, and Sarah was described as the worst typhoon there in 50 years. Wind gusts there peaked at 169 km/h (105 mph), the highest at the time in the country. High winds and waves heavily damaged the port of Busan. Nationwide, the storm destroyed over 14,000 homes and left 782,126 people homeless, causing over $100 million in damage. At least 669 people were killed in South Korea, and an additional 1,200 fishermen were lost offshore the country. In Japan, widespread flooding killed 47 people and destroyed 16,632 homes.

== Meteorological history ==
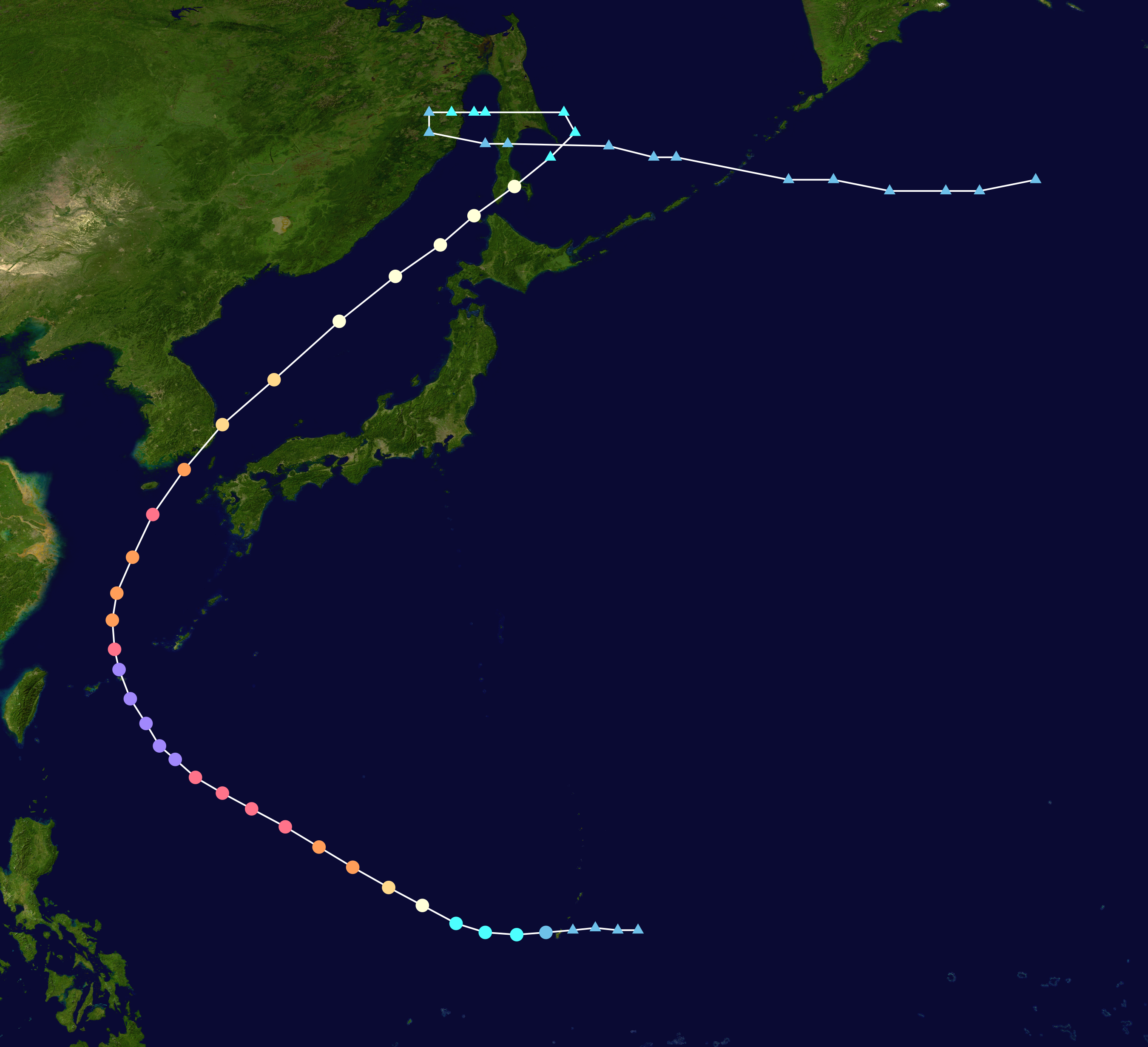
Map plotting the storm's track and intensity, according to the Saffir–Simpson scale Map key Saffir–Simpson scale Tropical depression (≤38 mph, ≤62 km/h) Tropical storm (39–73 mph, 63–118 km/h) Category 1 (74–95 mph, 119–153 km/h) Category 2 (96–110 mph, 154–177 km/h) Category 3 (111–129 mph, 178–208 km/h) Category 4 (130–156 mph, 209–251 km/h) Category 5 (≥157 mph, ≥252 km/h) Unknown Storm type Tropical cyclone Subtropical cyclone Extratropical cyclone, remnant low, tropical disturbance, or monsoon depression

On September 10, a tropical disturbance persisted within the Intertropical Convergence Zone near Pohnpei. When the hurricane hunters approached the system at 02:00 UTC on September 11, they observed a center with several small circulations about 130 km (81 mi) east of Guam. On that basis, the Joint Typhoon Warning Center (Note: The Joint Typhoon Warning Center was established in 1959 to track typhoons in the western Pacific Ocean for United States government agencies operating in the region.) classified the system as Tropical Depression Sarah. The depression passed near or just north of Guam, as tracked by radar. By late on September 11, the hurricane hunters were reporting flight-level winds of 95 km/h (60 mph). Early on September 12, the JTWC upgraded Sarah to a tropical storm after the circulation became better defined. The storm exhibited a parabolic trajectory that was slightly to the west of the typical September storm. It moved westward initially but gradually curved to the northwest. A hurricane hunters flight at 14:15 UTC on September 12 observed a 65 km (40 mi) eye diameter, prompting the JTWC to upgrade Sarah further to typhoon status, with maximum sustained winds of 120 km/h (75 mph). (Note: All wind values in the article are in 1 minute sustained winds unless otherwise stated.)

After becoming a typhoon, Sarah quickly intensified; at 08:00 UTC on September 13, the hurricane hunters reported flight-level winds of 185 km/h (115 mph). Subsequent analysis estimated that the typhoon attained these winds at 00:00 UTC that day. At 12:00 UTC on September 14, the JTWC estimated that Sarah intensified to the equivalent of a Category 5 on the Saffir–Simpson scale, based on aircraft estimates. The typhoon intensified further, and late on September 14 the hurricane hunters reported flight-level winds of 250 km/h (155 mph), estimating surface winds of 315 km/h (195 mph). The intensity was adjusted slightly downward in a post-analysis, with peak winds of 305 km/h (190 mph) at 06:00 UTC on September 15 about 415 km (258 mi) east of Taiwan. In addition, the typhoon attained a minimum barometric pressure of 905 mbar (26.7 inHg).

About three hours after Sarah reached peak winds, the typhoon moved directly over Miyako-jima, an island of Japan east of Taiwan. Sarah weakened while curving to the north, and it passed west of Okinawa late on September 15. The winds dropped quickly; by 24 hours after peak intensity, Sarah's winds had decreased from 305 to 185 km/h (190 to 115 mph). The typhoon turned and accelerated to the northeast toward the Korean Peninsula, re-intensifying slightly. By late on September 16, the winds increased to 215 km/h (135 mph) while Sarah passed just east of Jeju island. The typhoon weakened again to winds of 185 km/h (115 mph) by 00:00 UTC on September 17. That day, Sarah made landfall a few miles west of Busan, South Korea at that intensity; this made Sarah the strongest typhoon to strike the country since records began in 1904, and it remained as such until Typhoon Maemi surpassed it in 2003. The typhoon very quickly emerged into the Sea of Japan, its circulation becoming poorly defined. On September 18, Sarah became extratropical after moving over the northern Japanese island of Hokkaido. The remnants continued to the northeast initially before turning sharply westward, passing over Sakhalin. The circulation progressed into Primorsky Krai in the Russian Far East before turning back east. Former Typhoon Sarah struck Sakhalin a second time on September 20 while moving east-southeastward. After passing through the Kuril Islands, the remnants of Sarah dissipated on September 23.

== Preparations and impact ==
Significant typhoons with special names (from the Japan Meteorological Agency)
Name	Number	Japanese name
Ida	T4518	Makurazaki Typhoon (枕崎台風)
Louise	T4523	Akune Typhoon (阿久根台風)
Marie	T5415	Tōya Maru Typhoon (洞爺丸台風)
Ida	T5822	Kanogawa Typhoon (狩野川台風)
Sarah	T5914	Miyakojima Typhoon (宮古島台風)
Vera	T5915	Isewan Typhoon (伊勢湾台風)
Nancy	T6118	2nd Muroto Typhoon (第2室戸台風)
Cora	T6618	2nd Miyakojima Typhoon (第2宮古島台風)
Della	T6816	3rd Miyakojima Typhoon (第3宮古島台風)
Babe	T7709	Okinoerabu Typhoon (沖永良部台風)
Faxai	T1915	Reiwa 1 Bōsō Peninsula Typhoon (令和元年房総半島台風)
Hagibis	T1919	Reiwa 1 East Japan Typhoon (令和元年東日本台風)

Early in its duration, Sarah brought gusty winds and passing showers to Guam.

Shortly after reaching peak intensity, Sarah passed near the island of Miyako-jima. The pressure there fell to 908.1 mbar (26.82 inHg), which was the lowest recorded for the station and the second-lowest on record for Japan, both as of 2003. The typhoon produced sustained winds of 196 km/h (122 mph) and gusts up to 240 km/h (150 mph) before the anemometer broke. The winds destroyed over 6,000 homes and wrecked all of the crops. Sarah also left the island without power for an extended period of time after damaging power lines. The combination of high winds and rough seas destroyed a fishing pier and 670 m (2,200 ft) of seawall, as well as several tidal weirs. Sarah also sank four fishing boats and damaged seven others. On Miyako-jima, Sarah killed seven people, injured 88 others, and left $2 million in damage. The heavy damage on the island prompted the Japan Meteorological Agency to give Sarah the special name of the "Miyakojima Typhoon". Sarah was part of a series of typhoons striking the island in 1959, causing food shortages that forced the population to change their diet. The storm brushed Okinawa with gusts of 135 km/h (85 mph).

Sarah was the worst typhoon to strike the Korean peninsula in 50 years. The peak wind gust in South Korea was 169 km/h (105 mph), which was the highest for a typhoon at the time, with records dating back to 1904; as of 2010, the value has fallen to the ninth place. Damage was heaviest at Busan where the storm struck. The port there sustained over $100,000 in damage, and nearby American military bases had over $900,000 in damage. Coastal floods washed away or damaged 15,379 homes in the Busan area, leaving 25,834 people homeless. The waves also damaged or sank 5,400 boats. Nationwide, floods damaged 127,000 hectares (313,000 acres) of crop fields. Throughout South Korea, Sarah destroyed over 14,000 homes and left 782,126 people homeless, thousands of whom were injured. The Ministry of Social Affairs estimated property damage at over $100 million, and the typhoon killed at least 669 people. After the storm, the CARE relief agency launched an appeal in the United States, collecting $18,500 worth of shoes and underwear for storm victims. The Australian Red Cross also provided assistance to the country, including money, sheets, and blankets. Due to the ongoing Korean War and Sarah, South Korea lost much of its fishing fleet, resulting in diminished catches over the subsequent decades. The typhoon also caused a rise in the wholesale price index, in conjunction with political uncertainty.

A fleet of 46 boats left Oenarodo near Busan on August 28 to fish near Komundo Island. The fleet failed to return after the passage of Typhoon Sarah, and local newspapers reported all 1,200 fishermen were lost.

Late in its duration, Sarah struck Hokkaido, producing a 6 m (20 ft) storm surge at Taisei along the southwest coast that left behind a sediment layer 60 m (200 ft) inland. Before the storm arrived, the United States evacuated planes from Marine Corps Air Station Iwakuni to Misawa Air Base, although Sarah approached closer to the latter base. The storm affected much of the nation, flooding many communities, including 14,360 houses. Across the country, the typhoon damaged 778 boats. The storm also damaged 3,566 ha (8,810 acres) of crop fields. Nationwide, Sarah destroyed 16,632 homes, injured 509 people, and killed 47.

Overall, Typhoon Sarah caused around 2,000 deaths, making it among the deadliest typhoons on record.

== See also ==
- Typhoon Emma (1956) – took a similar track near Japan and South Korea three years before Sarah
- Typhoon Cora (1966) – 2nd Miyakojima Typhoon
- Typhoon Della (1968) – 3rd Miyakojima Typhoon
- Typhoon Maemi (2003) – the strongest typhoon to strike South Korea
- Typhoon Hinnamnor (2022)
