= Typhoon Faxai =

Pacific typhoon in 2019

Typhoon Faxai Reiwa 1 Bōsō Peninsula Typhoon
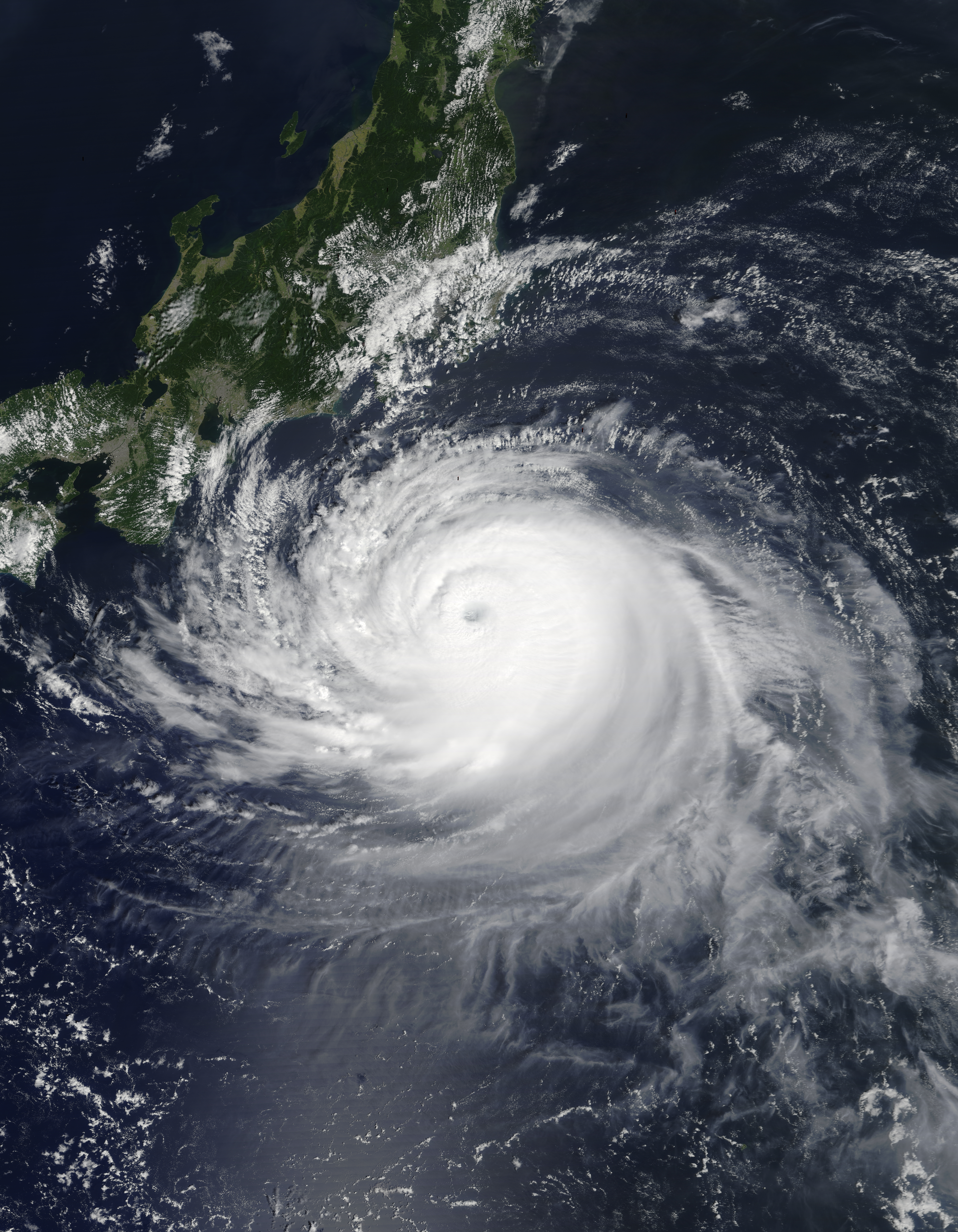
- Typhoon Faxai at peak intensity on September 8

Meteorological history
- Formed: August 29, 2019
- Extratropical: September 10, 2019
- Dissipated: September 12, 2019

Very strong typhoon
- 10-minute sustained (JMA)
- Highest winds: 155 km/h (100 mph)
- Lowest pressure: 955 hPa (mbar); 28.20 inHg

Category 4-equivalent typhoon
- 1-minute sustained (SSHWS/JTWC)
- Highest winds: 215 km/h (130 mph)
- Lowest pressure: 940 hPa (mbar); 27.76 inHg

Overall effects
- Fatalities: 3 total
- Damage: $10 billion (2019 USD) (Tied as sixth-costliest typhoon on record in nominal terms)
- Areas affected: Wake Island, Japan
- IBTrACS
- Part of the 2019 Pacific typhoon season

Typhoon Faxai, (Note: The name Faxai (Lao: ຟ້າໃສ, [faː˥˨ saj˩]) was contributed by Laos and is a feminine given name meaning "clear skies" in Lao.) known in Japan as the Reiwa 1 Bōsō Peninsula Typhoon (令和元年房総半島台風, Reiwa Gannen Bōsō-hantō Taifū), was the first typhoon to strike the Kantō region since Mindulle in 2016, and the strongest typhoon to hit the region since Ma-on in 2004. It was also the worst to hit the region since Talas in 2011, until the region was hit by the more destructive Typhoon Hagibis less than a month later. Forming as the fifteenth named storm of the 2019 Pacific typhoon season, the precursor to Faxai was first noted as a weak tropical depression to the east of the International Date Line on August 29. The depression then entered the West Pacific basin on August 30. After moving in a general westward direction, the system strengthened into a named tropical storm by September 5. Faxai then strengthened into the sixth typhoon of the season the next day. Two days later, Faxai reached its peak strength as a Category 4 typhoon just before making landfall in mainland Japan. Turning northeastward, Faxai rapidly weakened and became extratropical on September 10.

Three people were killed and 147 others were injured. More than 390,000 people were urged to be evacuated. Faxai left 934,000 households without power. Train services in JR East were cancelled due to the storm. Two people died from heatstroke because of the power outage. Total loss in Japan were finalized at US$10 billion.

== Meteorological history ==
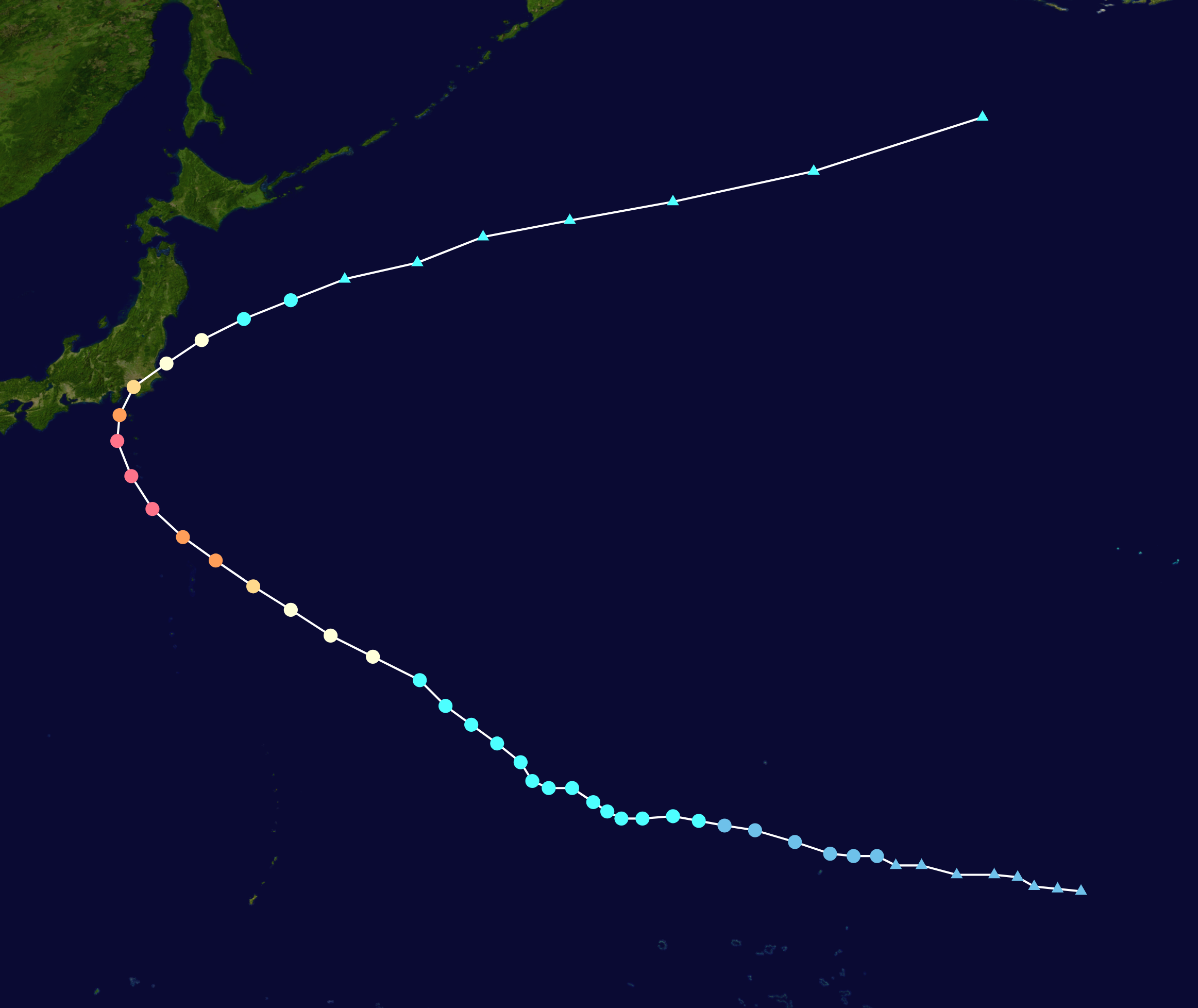
Map plotting the storm's track and intensity, according to the Saffir–Simpson scale Map key Saffir–Simpson scale Tropical depression (≤38 mph, ≤62 km/h) Tropical storm (39–73 mph, 63–118 km/h) Category 1 (74–95 mph, 119–153 km/h) Category 2 (96–110 mph, 154–177 km/h) Category 3 (111–129 mph, 178–208 km/h) Category 4 (130–156 mph, 209–251 km/h) Category 5 (≥157 mph, ≥252 km/h) Unknown Storm type Tropical cyclone Subtropical cyclone Extratropical cyclone, remnant low, tropical disturbance, or monsoon depression

On August 30, 2019, a tropical disturbance formed approximately 1,402 km (871 mi) east-northeast of Kwajalein in the Marshall Islands, and was marked as Invest 90W by the Joint Typhoon Warning Center (JTWC). A broad overcast obscured the system's circulation whilst thunderstorms or convection developed to the northwest of the system. The disturbance continued to stockpile deep convection over very warm sea surface temperatures of 31 to 32 °C (88 to 90 °F) and low vertical wind shear, conditions which are conducive for further tropical cyclogenesis. By September 1, the JTWC announced a Tropical Cyclone Formation Alert as the system began to develop rainbands extending to the north. The system was designated Tropical Depression 14W by the JTWC at 18:00 UTC on that same day. The Japan Meteorological Agency (JMA) later recognize the system as a tropical depression early on September 2. As the depression passed just southwest of Wake Island, the JTWC estimated that the system had intensified into a tropical storm at 18:00 UTC, though the JMA still kept the classification as a tropical depression by that time. While maintaining the tropical storm strength according to the JTWC, the system strolled westward then west-northwestward alongside a subtropical ridge for the course of two days.

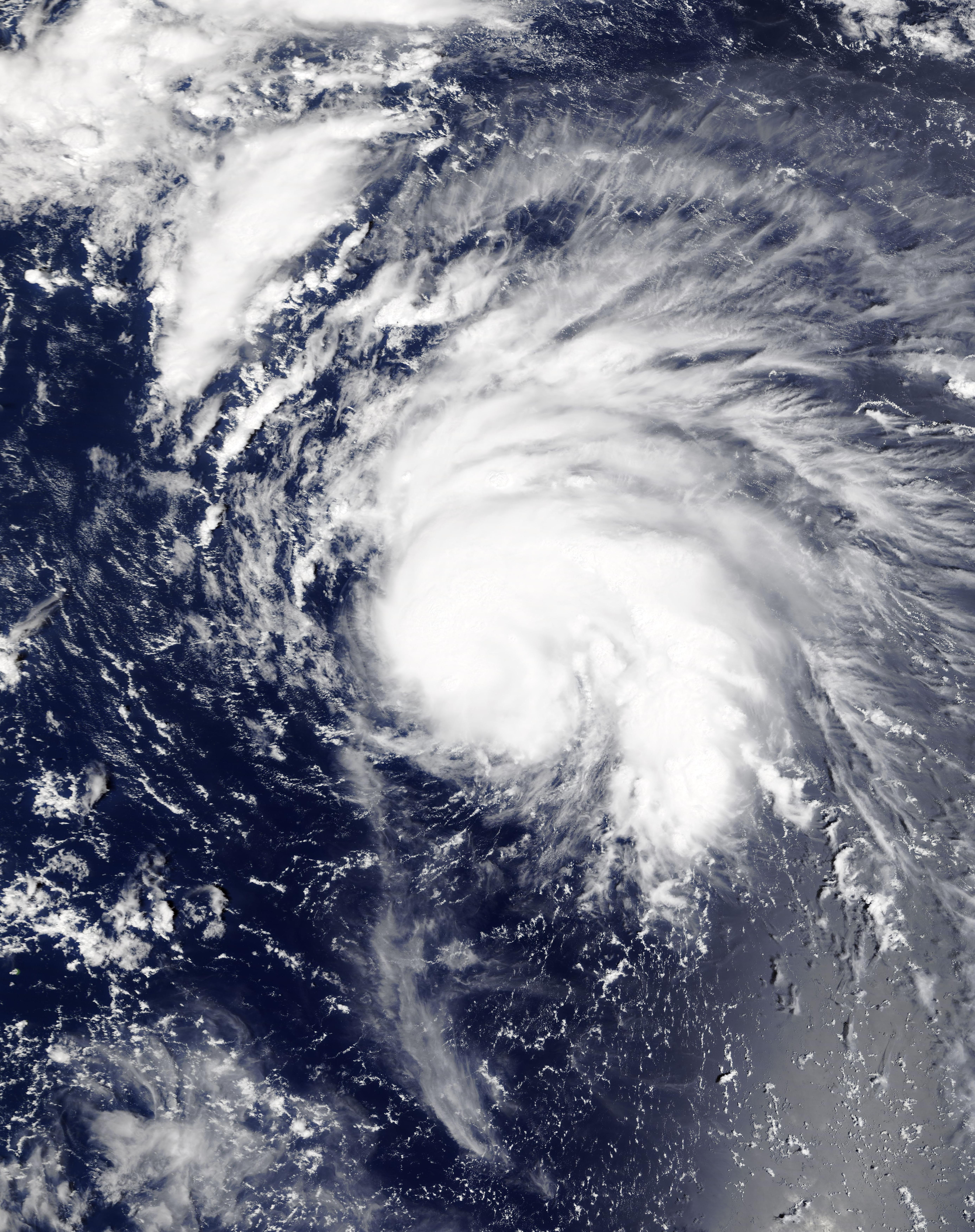
Severe Tropical Storm Faxai intensifying on September 6

During September 4, the JMA upgraded the system to a tropical storm, assigning the name Faxai. On the following day, deep convection was displaced to the east of the partially-exposed circulation. A tropical upper tropospheric trough (TUTT) cell to the northwest with troughing to the south of it induced strong subsidence to the west of the system. It weakened westward outflow, hindering development from atop, though another TUTT cell to the east provided ventilation for the shifted convection. Later on September 5, the circulation moved underneath the convection. The TUTT cell to the northwest weakened on September 6, allowing poleward outflow to develop. At 06:00 UTC, Faxai attained severe tropical storm status from the JMA. As Faxai organized its convection, it began to develop an eye feature. Faxai later intensified into a typhoon as according to Dvorak estimates by the JTWC; the JMA did not upgrade the storm's status until 00:00 UTC of September 7. Owing to the favorable conditions, Faxai underwent rapid intensification, attaining 1-minute sustained winds of 195 km/h (120 mph). The eye had expanded to 28 km (17 mi), surrounded by 170 km (100 mi) of compact convection in the center. By 18:00 UTC, Faxai had attained its peak intensity; the JMA assessed 10-minute sustained winds at 155 km/h (100 mph) and the lowest barometric pressure at 955 hPa (28.20 inHg), and the JTWC estimated 1-minute sustained winds of 215 km/h (130 mph), equivalent to a Category 4 hurricane. Sustained by low vertical wind shear and radial outflow, the storm maintained its intensity for 12 hours.

On September 8, Faxai weakened for the onset of an eyewall replacement cycle. The subtropical ridge steered Faxai east-northeastward after having its northwestern periphery eroded by the westerlies. In 18:00 UTC, Faxai made landfall above the Kantō Plain with 1-minute winds of 165 km/h (105 mph). Entering a region of cooler waters, Faxai began to weaken significantly. It fell below typhoon strength at 12:00 UTC. As the storm accelerated at 31 km/h (20 mph) by September 10, it embedded with the baroclinic zone, commencing the transition into an extratropical cyclone. In 18:00 UTC, the storm had transformed into a cold-core low of gale-force, with wind force that extended 1,500 km (920 mi) east of Misawa Air Base. It continued to shift east-northeastward, crossing the International Date Line on September 11, before dissipating by 18:00 UTC of that day.

== Preparations ==
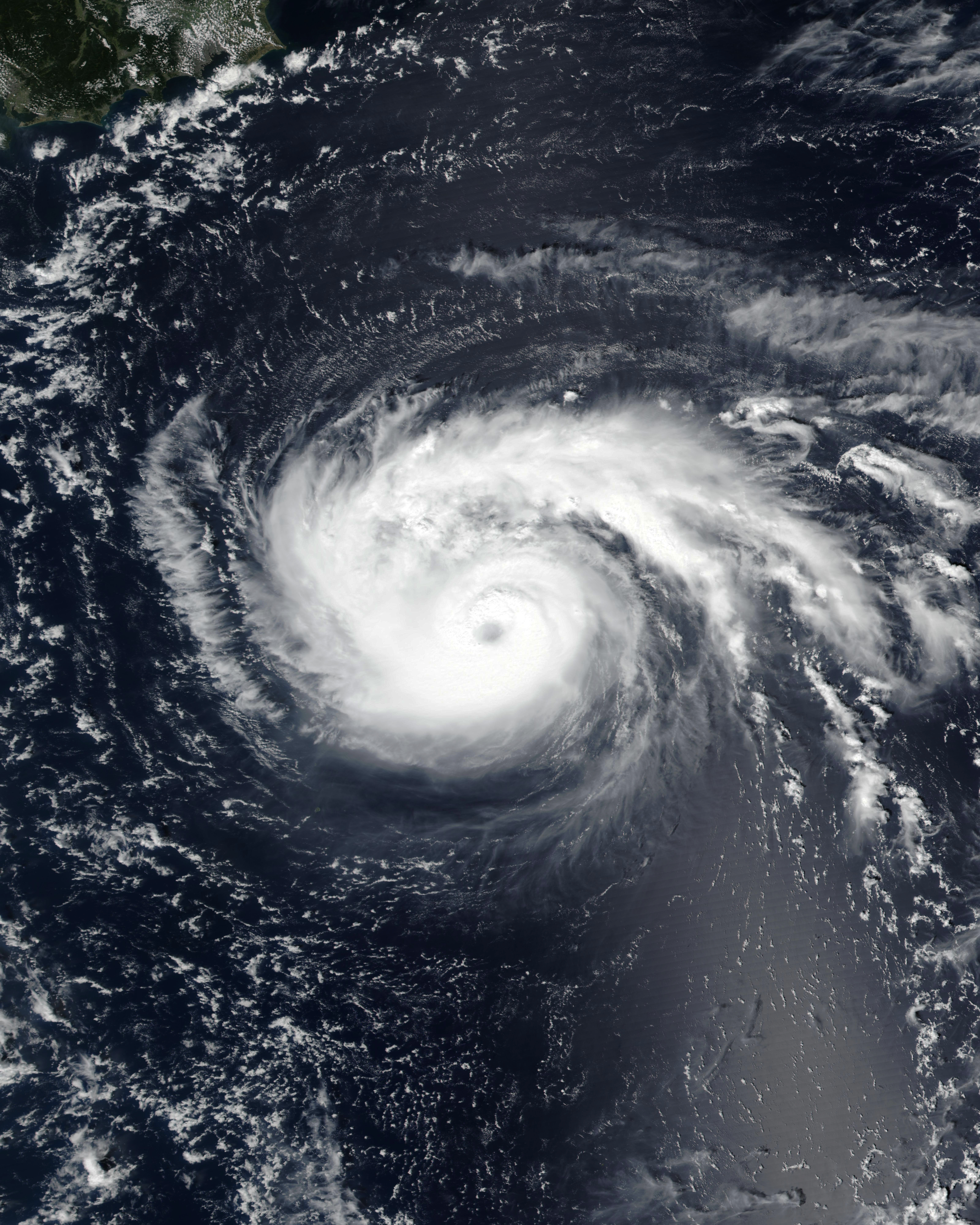
Typhoon Faxai intensifying as it approaches Japan on September 7

Prior to the storm's arrival, over 390,000 people were urged to evacuate as the storm headed towards Japan. Over 100 flights were canceled due to the storm, including 49 from Japan Airlines and 41 from All Nippon Airways. Ships that were set to depart from Tokyo Port were canceled as well. 13,300 customers at the Narita International Airport were trapped in the airport overnight. Passengers were forced to stay inside the airport, when both railways towards the city center were shut down. The airport handed out 18,000 sets of water and other utensils to customers at the airport. Highways were closed across Japan. The Japan Meteorological Agency (JMA) issued warnings for storm surge, flooding, and landslides, advising residents to avoid going outdoors. About 150,000 people across the Kanagawa, Shizuoka, and Tokyo Prefectures were sent an evacuation advisory. In addition, 2.5 million people were given instructions for preparations. Shelters were initiated across Tokyo as well.

The JMA forecasted that Faxai will make landfall with winds up to 216 km/h (135 mph). As much as 300 mm (12 in) of rain was predicted to fall in Tokyo. Many homes and businesses were boarded up or secured by people across the country. On September 8, the Central Japan Railway Company cancelled or suspended approximately 50 bullet train services for areas in between Tokyo and Osaka Prefecture. The East Japan Railway Company also stopped its services in Greater Tokyo in precaution of heavy rain. U.S. bases had recovery teams ready for action after Faxai made landfall. Airbases all set closures the latest one being a base at the shoreline of Tokyo Bay at 11:15 am on September 9.

Due to a series of flight cancellations and suspensions, some local governments cancelled welcome events at pre-campsites for the 2019 Rugby World Cup. The French team managed to enter their training camp near Mount Fuji, though the Australian team had their preparations disrupted by the typhoon. Oriental Land, which operates Tokyo Disney Resort in Urayasu, Chiba Prefecture, delayed the opening hours for Tokyo Disneyland and Tokyo DisneySea. Both parks were closed an hour prior to 9:00 pm on September 8. On the following day, Tokyo DisneySea's opening hours was postponed by one hour, matching with the other park's hours.

== Impact ==
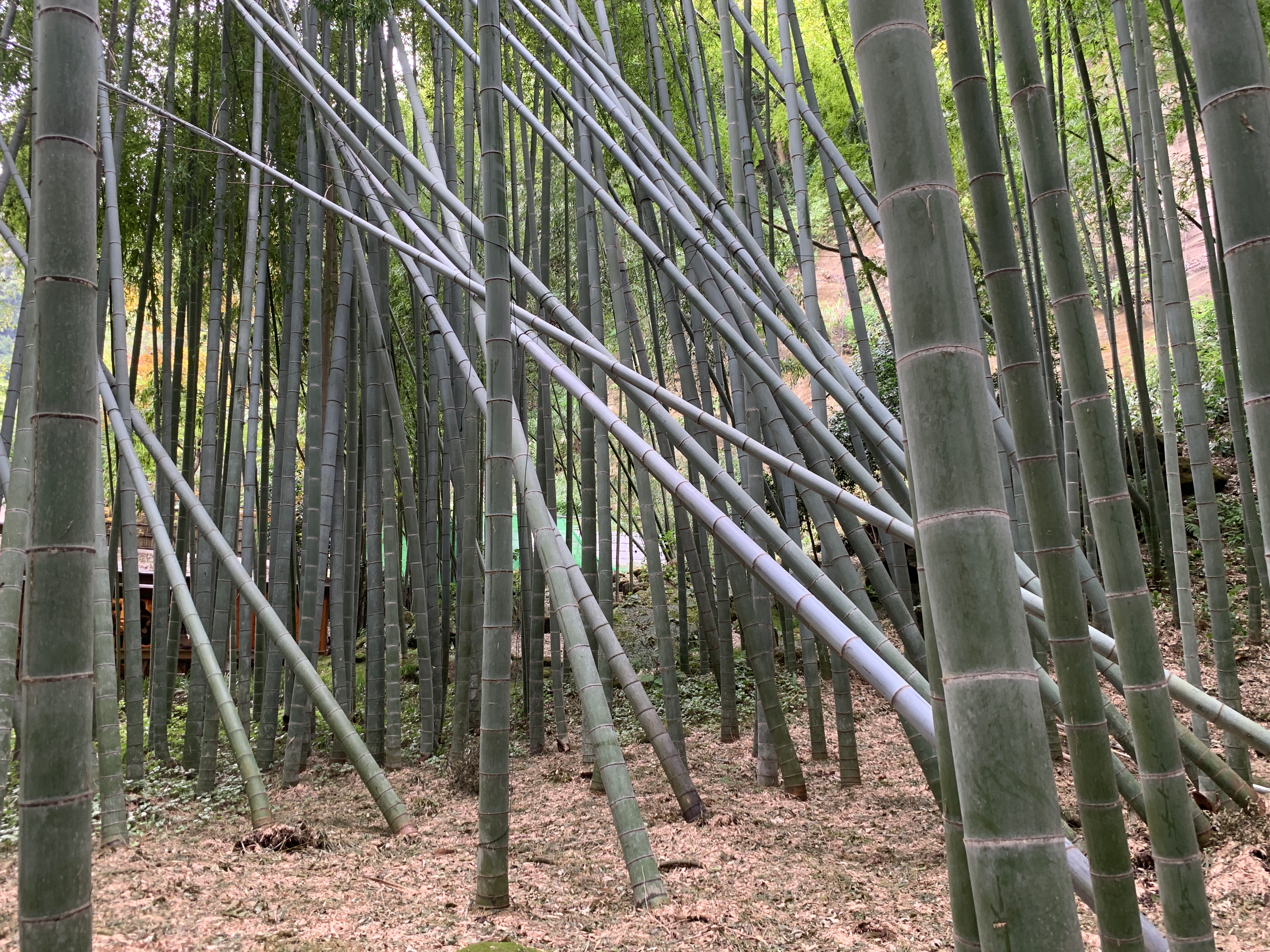
Aftermath of typhoon Faxai at Hōkoku-ji bamboo garden

Significant typhoons with special names (from the Japan Meteorological Agency)
Name	Number	Japanese name
Ida	T4518	Makurazaki Typhoon (枕崎台風)
Louise	T4523	Akune Typhoon (阿久根台風)
Marie	T5415	Tōya Maru Typhoon (洞爺丸台風)
Ida	T5822	Kanogawa Typhoon (狩野川台風)
Sarah	T5914	Miyakojima Typhoon (宮古島台風)
Vera	T5915	Isewan Typhoon (伊勢湾台風)
Nancy	T6118	2nd Muroto Typhoon (第2室戸台風)
Cora	T6618	2nd Miyakojima Typhoon (第2宮古島台風)
Della	T6816	3rd Miyakojima Typhoon (第3宮古島台風)
Babe	T7709	Okinoerabu Typhoon (沖永良部台風)
Faxai	T1915	Reiwa 1 Bōsō Peninsula Typhoon (令和元年房総半島台風)
Hagibis	T1919	Reiwa 1 East Japan Typhoon (令和元年東日本台風)

In Tokyo, beach homes had their windows and doors blown out by the storm. Two transmission towers were destroyed which left 100,000 homes and businesses without signal. A blackout across Japan left a Sony Corp, factory to shut down. The blackout stretched across the city of Tokyo with the Tokyo Electric Power Company saying that 730,000 households were without power. Winds caused damage across the area of Honshu damaging homes, knocking out power and uprooting trees. It was recorded that between 3 and 8 inches of rain fell in southeastern Honshu causing minor flooding in the area. It was said that a landslide could be triggered by Faxai, but no landslide had been reported. Faxai was linked to three deaths and a dozen injuries in Japan alone, with more than 850,000 customers without power. Fires were reported at a solar power plant after Faxai and across the Chiba Prefecture farmlands being flooded due to heavy rain across Japan. People were toppled by large wind gusts during the storm with the eyewall passing over Japan damaging many areas. A woman was killed when she was toppled by a wind gust. Transportation systems were closed when Faxai blasted the area.

Costliest known Pacific typhoons (adjusted for inflation)
Rank	Typhoon	Season	Damage (2025 USD)
1	4 Doksuri	2023	$30.1 billion
2	4 Mireille	1991	$23.6 billion
3	5 Hagibis	2019	$21.8 billion
4	5 Saomai	2000	$17.3 billion
5	5 Jebi	2018	$16.7 billion
6	4 Songda	2004	$15.9 billion
7	5 Yagi	2024	$15.1 billion
8	2 Fitow	2013	$14.4 billion
9	4 Faxai	2019	$12.6 billion
10	4 Tokage	2004	$12.1 billion

Faxai was recorded as one of the most powerful typhoons to impact Tokyo, with 134 mph winds being recorded in Tokyo. The Tokyo Bay grew by a few inches because of the heavy rainfall total that Faxai dropped. Metal signs were torn off of buildings, trucks were knocked down or overturned, a gas station was destroyed and a glass case was also destroyed leaving broken glass scattered through streets. Television footage showed a huge roof collapsing at a petrol station in Tateyama.

== Aftermath and retirement ==
Due to the severe impact in Japan, the name Faxai was retired during the 52nd annual session of the ESCAP/WMO Typhoon Committee in February 2020 and will never be used again as a typhoon name. In February 2021, the Typhoon Committee subsequently chose Nongfa as its replacement name.

== See also ==
- Weather of 2019
- Tropical cyclones in 2019
- Typhoon Ida (1958)
- Typhoon Oscar (1995)
- Typhoon Ma-on (2004)
- Typhoon Mindulle (2016)
- Typhoon Hagibis (2019)
