= Typhoon Della (1968) =

Pacific typhoon in 1968

Typhoon Della (Maring) 3rd Miyakojima Typhoon
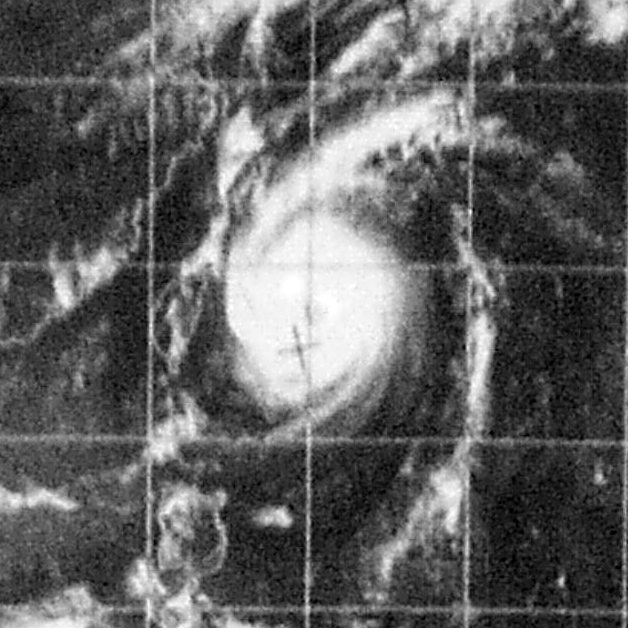

Meteorological history
- Formed: September 11, 1968
- Dissipated: September 25, 1968

Typhoon
- 10-minute sustained (JMA)
- Lowest pressure: 930 hPa (mbar); 27.46 inHg

Category 4-equivalent typhoon
- 1-minute sustained (SSHWS/JTWC)
- Highest winds: 220 km/h (140 mph)
- Lowest pressure: 930 hPa (mbar); 27.46 inHg

Overall effects
- Fatalities: 11 total
- Areas affected: Kyushu, Ryukyu Islands (most notably Miyakojima)
- IBTrACS
- Part of the 1968 Pacific typhoon season

Typhoon Della, known in Japan as the 3rd Miyakojima Typhoon (第3宮古島台風, 3rd Miyakojima Taifū) and in the Philippines as Typhoon Maring, was a typhoon that struck Miyakojima of Ryukyu Islands and Kyūshū Island in September 1968.

== Meteorological history ==
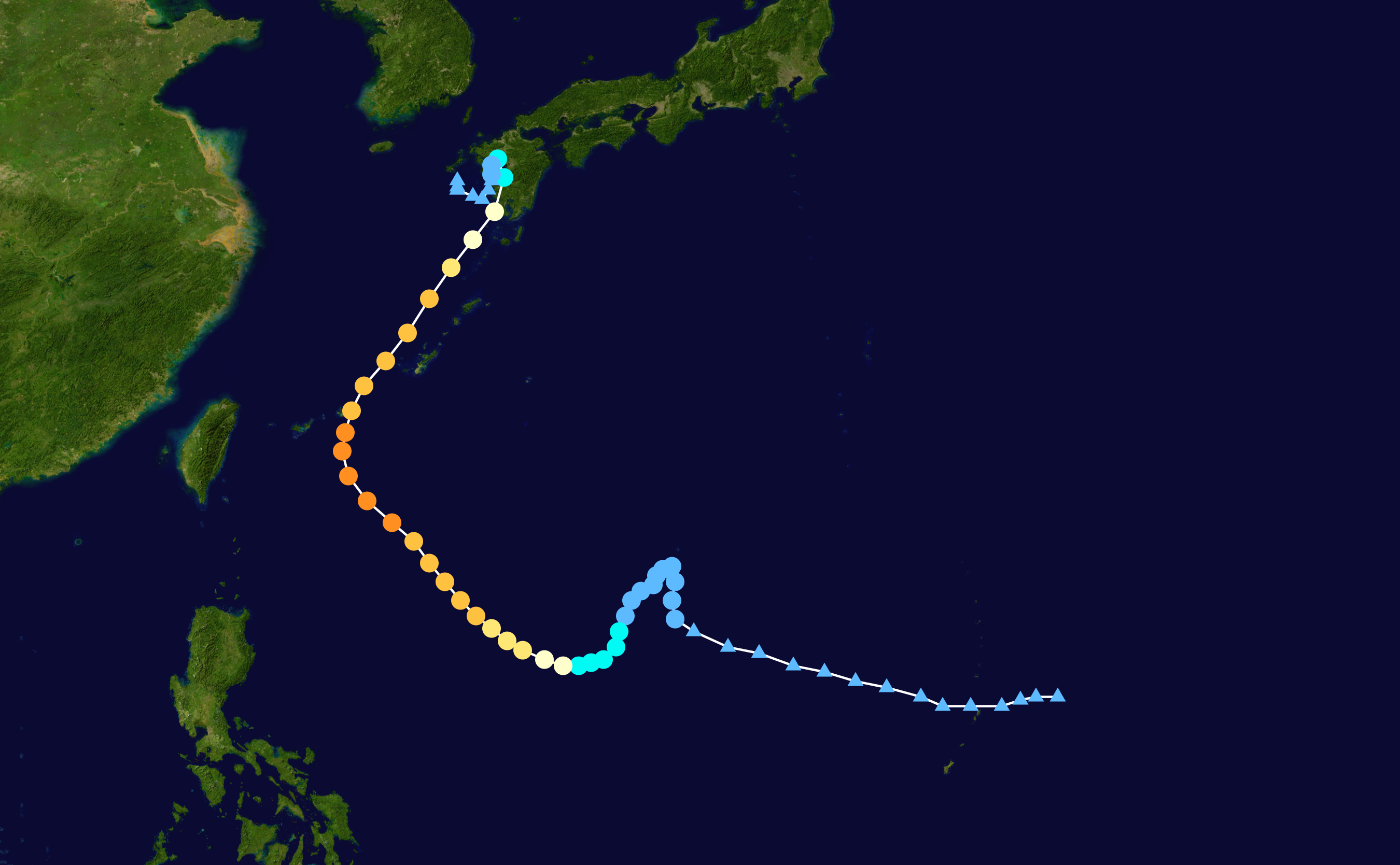
Map plotting the storm's track and intensity, according to the Saffir–Simpson scale Map key Saffir–Simpson scale Tropical depression (≤38 mph, ≤62 km/h) Tropical storm (39–73 mph, 63–118 km/h) Category 1 (74–95 mph, 119–153 km/h) Category 2 (96–110 mph, 154–177 km/h) Category 3 (111–129 mph, 178–208 km/h) Category 4 (130–156 mph, 209–251 km/h) Category 5 (≥157 mph, ≥252 km/h) Unknown Storm type Tropical cyclone Subtropical cyclone Extratropical cyclone, remnant low, tropical disturbance, or monsoon depression

Della passed near Miyakojima on September 22. After that, it proceeded along the Nansei Islands and landed near Kushikino City, Kagoshima Prefecture on the 24th.

== Impact ==
Significant typhoons with special names (from the Japan Meteorological Agency)
Name	Number	Japanese name
Ida	T4518	Makurazaki Typhoon (枕崎台風)
Louise	T4523	Akune Typhoon (阿久根台風)
Marie	T5415	Tōya Maru Typhoon (洞爺丸台風)
Ida	T5822	Kanogawa Typhoon (狩野川台風)
Sarah	T5914	Miyakojima Typhoon (宮古島台風)
Vera	T5915	Isewan Typhoon (伊勢湾台風)
Nancy	T6118	2nd Muroto Typhoon (第2室戸台風)
Cora	T6618	2nd Miyakojima Typhoon (第2宮古島台風)
Della	T6816	3rd Miyakojima Typhoon (第3宮古島台風)
Babe	T7709	Okinoerabu Typhoon (沖永良部台風)
Faxai	T1915	Reiwa 1 Bōsō Peninsula Typhoon (令和元年房総半島台風)
Hagibis	T1919	Reiwa 1 East Japan Typhoon (令和元年東日本台風)

Due to the typhoon, storms in Miyakojima caused major damage to homes and crops. In Kagoshima prefecture, the damage caused by salt wind and storm surge was great. On the Pacific side of western Japan, heavy rainfall caused flood damage.

The typhoon killed 11 people and injured 80 in Japan. In addition, more than 20,000 houses were damaged.

Della caused a great deal of damage to Miyakojima, so the Japan Meteorological Agency named Della the "3rd Miyakojima Typhoon".

In the past, Typhoon Sarah in 1959 and Typhoon Cora in 1966 struck Miyako Island as well, so they are named "Miyakojima Typhoon" and "2nd Miyakojima Typhoon", respectively.

== See also ==
- Typhoon Sarah (1959) - Miyakojima Typhoon
- Typhoon Cora (1966) - 2nd Miyakojima Typhoon
