= Typhoon Nancy (1961) =

Category 5 Pacific typhoon

Typhoon Nancy 2nd Muroto Typhoon
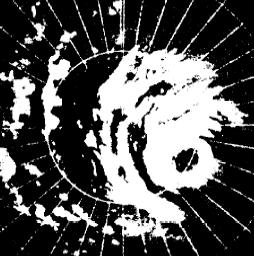
- A radar image of Nancy

Meteorological history
- Formed: September 7, 1961
- Extratropical: September 16, 1961
- Dissipated: September 22, 1961

Violent typhoon
- 10-minute sustained (JMA)
- Lowest pressure: 890 hPa (mbar); 26.28 inHg

Category 5-equivalent super typhoon
- 1-minute sustained (SSHWS/JTWC)
- Highest winds: 345 km/h (215 mph)
- Lowest pressure: 882 hPa (mbar); 26.05 inHg

Overall effects
- Fatalities: 202 [confirmed]
- Missing: 8
- Damage: $500 million (1961 USD)
- Areas affected: Guam, Ryūkyū Islands, Japan
- IBTrACS
- Part of the 1961 Pacific typhoon season

Super Typhoon Nancy, also known as the 2nd Muroto Typhoon (第二室戸台風, Daini-muroto Taifū), was an extremely powerful tropical cyclone of the 1961 Pacific typhoon season, produced the highest accumulated cyclone energy—a metric used to measure the total energy generated by tropical cyclones—of any individual cyclone on record in the basin, also one of the most intense tropical cyclones on record. The system possibly had the strongest winds ever measured in a tropical cyclone, with 345 km/h (215 mph) winds, tied with Hurricane Patricia of 2015. Nancy caused extensive damage, as well as at least 202 deaths and nearly 5,000 injuries in Japan and elsewhere, in September 1961.

== Meteorological history ==
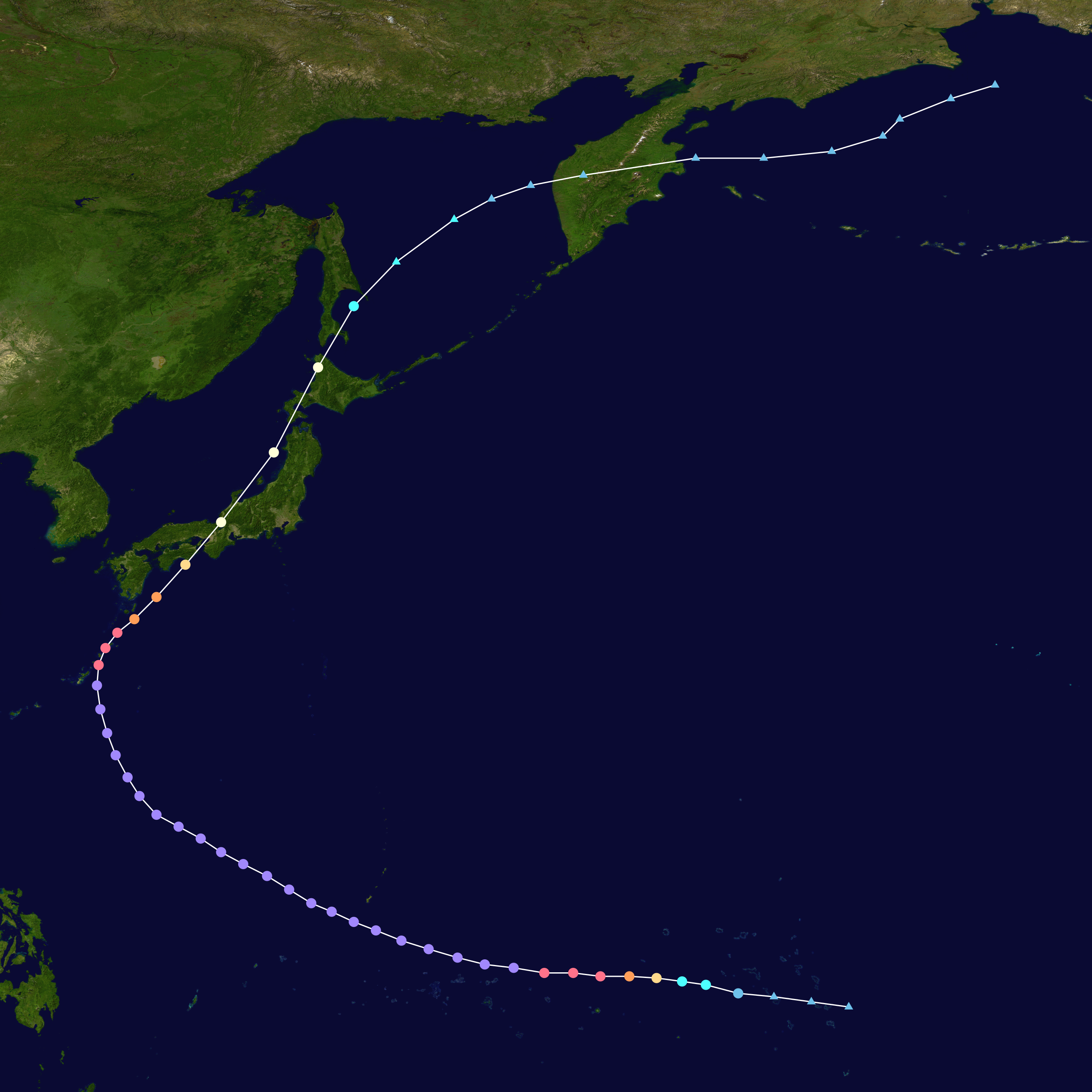
Map plotting the storm's track and intensity, according to the Saffir–Simpson scale Map key Saffir–Simpson scale Tropical depression (≤38 mph, ≤62 km/h) Tropical storm (39–73 mph, 63–118 km/h) Category 1 (74–95 mph, 119–153 km/h) Category 2 (96–110 mph, 154–177 km/h) Category 3 (111–129 mph, 178–208 km/h) Category 4 (130–156 mph, 209–251 km/h) Category 5 (≥157 mph, ≥252 km/h) Unknown Storm type Tropical cyclone Subtropical cyclone Extratropical cyclone, remnant low, tropical disturbance, or monsoon depression

A tropical depression formed from a low-pressure area near Kwajalein Atoll on September 7. It strengthened rapidly; by the time position fixes could be taken, Nancy was nearly a super typhoon, on September 8. Moving gradually westward, Nancy explosively deepened and reached wind speeds equivalent to a Category 5 super typhoon (Saffir–Simpson Hurricane Scale) on September 9. It would maintain that intensity for the next several days.

On September 12, the storm reached its peak intensity with a possible 345 km/h (215 mph). However, older measurements were unreliable, so it was most likely weaker.

Shortly after reaching peak intensity, Nancy approached the Ryūkyū Islands and began turning. It passed near Okinawa and over Naze. The ridge steering Nancy broke down, and the typhoon turned sharply and headed towards Japan. Nancy made landfall as a strong typhoon on September 16 as it passed directly over Cape Muroto. Nancy made a second landfall on Honshū near Osaka. The typhoon rapidly traveled up the length of the island as it continued accelerating, eventually reaching a forward speed of 105 km/h; 56 kn (65 mph). The typhoon quickly crossed over Hokkaidō before entering the Sea of Okhotsk as a tropical storm. Nancy went extratropical on September 17. The extratropical system eventually crossed over Kamchatka and entered the open ocean.

== Impact ==
Significant typhoons with special names (from the Japan Meteorological Agency)
Name	Number	Japanese name
Ida	T4518	Makurazaki Typhoon (枕崎台風)
Louise	T4523	Akune Typhoon (阿久根台風)
Marie	T5415	Tōya Maru Typhoon (洞爺丸台風)
Ida	T5822	Kanogawa Typhoon (狩野川台風)
Sarah	T5914	Miyakojima Typhoon (宮古島台風)
Vera	T5915	Isewan Typhoon (伊勢湾台風)
Nancy	T6118	2nd Muroto Typhoon (第2室戸台風)
Cora	T6618	2nd Miyakojima Typhoon (第2宮古島台風)
Della	T6816	3rd Miyakojima Typhoon (第3宮古島台風)
Babe	T7709	Okinoerabu Typhoon (沖永良部台風)
Faxai	T1915	Reiwa 1 Bōsō Peninsula Typhoon (令和元年房総半島台風)
Hagibis	T1919	Reiwa 1 East Japan Typhoon (令和元年東日本台風)

Although there is no damage total known for Nancy, damage was "phenomenal" according to the JMA. There were at least 194 deaths and eight people unaccounted for, according to the Japanese government.

=== Guam ===
On Guam, over half of all crops were destroyed by heavy winds and rain. A total of $40,000 (1961 USD) worth of damage was done to roads on the island. Most of the damage was on the southern end of the island. No deaths were reported on Guam.

=== Ryukyu Islands ===
On Okinawa, low-lying areas experienced heavy flooding, which did significant damage to agriculture and structures.

=== Japan ===
In Japan, according to Japan Fire and Disaster Management Agency official confirmed report, 194 people were killed, 8 were missing, and 4,972 people were injured. These totals made Nancy the sixth-deadliest typhoon to hit Japan at the time. Timely warnings and adequate preparations were probably responsible for the relatively low death toll. The damage was "small" relative to other typhoons that impacted densely populated areas of Japan.

Hundreds of thousands of people had their lives disrupted. Super Typhoon Nancy destroyed 11,539 houses, damaged 32,604 homes, and flooded 280,078 others. Although the exact number may never be known, the Stars and Stripes reported in late September 1961 that over 1,056 ships and fishing vessels were sunk or blown ashore, and that many more were damaged.

Floodwaters washed away 566 bridges and caused 1146 landslides. Roads were destroyed at a total of 2,053 locations. Damages in Osaka amounted to US$0.5 billion.

On Amami Ōshima, one person was missing and another was badly injured. A ship was sunk. Extensive flooding of crops and houses left 152 people homeless.

Due to Nancy's damage and death toll, the Japan Meteorological Agency named Nancy the "Second Muroto Typhoon". Nancy is one of only twelve typhoons to receive special names in Japan.

== Records ==
Most intense Pacific typhoons
	Typhoon	Season	Pressure	
	Typhoon	Season	hPa	inHg
1	Tip	1979	870	25.7
2	June	1975	875	25.8
2	Nora	1973	875	25.8
4	Forrest	1983	876	25.9
5	Ida	1958	877	25.9
6	Rita	1978	878	26.0
7	Kit	1966	880	26.0
7	Vanessa	1984	880	26.0
9	Nancy	1961	882	26.4
10	Irma	1971	884	26.1
Source: JMA Typhoon Best Track Analysis Information for the North Western Pacific Ocean.

A reconnaissance aircraft flying into the typhoon near its peak intensity on September 12 determined Nancy's one-minute sustained winds to be 185 knots (213 mph; 343 km/h). If these values are reliable, they would be the highest wind speeds ever measured in a tropical cyclone. However, it was later determined that measurements and estimations of wind speeds from the 1940s to 1960s were excessive. Thus, Nancy's winds may actually be lower than its official best-track value, which may actually be closer to 153 knots (285 km/h; 175 mph). In 2016, reanalysis of Hurricane Patricia noted that the storm had the same sustained winds as Nancy, the highest on record in the Western Hemisphere.

Although the Saffir–Simpson hurricane wind scale (SSHWS) did not exist at the time, Nancy would have been a Category 5 equivalent for a total of five and a half days (or 132 hours), assuming the wind speed data is reliable. If so, this is the record for the Northern Hemisphere and more than a day longer than the runner-up system, 1962's Typhoon Karen.

== See also ==
- List of tropical cyclone records
- Other storms of the same name
- 1934 Muroto typhoon—The most intense landfalling typhoon in Japanese history, with a peak low pressure of 911.9 hPa (26.93 inHg)
- Typhoon Vera (1959)—The strongest storm to ever impact Japan, with maximum sustained wind speeds of 160 mph (260 km/h) upon landfall—comparable to a Category 5–equivalent super typhoon
- Typhoon Mireille (1991)—Similar track, also very costly and destructive upon landfall
- Typhoon Neoguri (2014)—Similar track, though much weaker on landfall
- Hurricane Patricia (2015)—Ties Typhoon Nancy for one-minute maximum sustained winds of 215 mph (346 km/h)
- Typhoon Jebi (2018)—Similar track, also caused massive damage in Japan
- Typhoon Hagibis (2019)—Another deadly and extremely destructive storm that became the costliest typhoon on record at the time
