= Typhoon Ida (1958) =

Pacific typhoon in 1958

Typhoon Ida Kanogawa Typhoon
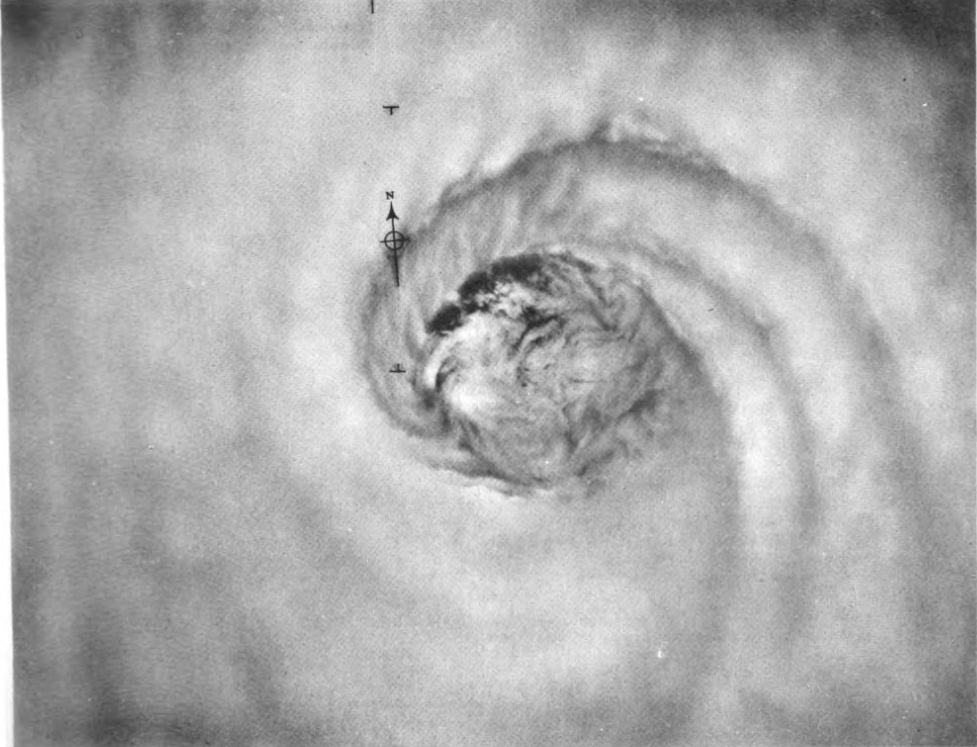
- The eye of Typhoon Ida at peak intensity on September 25 photographed by a high-flying U-2 aircraft.

Meteorological history
- Formed: September 20, 1958
- Extratropical: September 27, 1958
- Dissipated: September 30, 1958

Violent typhoon
- 10-minute sustained (JMA)
- Lowest pressure: 877 hPa (mbar); 25.90 inHg (Sixth-lowest worldwide)

Category 5-equivalent super typhoon
- 1-minute sustained (SSHWS/JTWC)
- Highest winds: 325 km/h (200 mph)
- Lowest pressure: 877 hPa (mbar); 25.90 inHg (Sixth-lowest worldwide)

Overall effects
- Fatalities: 1,269 total
- Damage: $50 million (1958 USD)
- Areas affected: Japan
- IBTrACS
- Part of the 1958 Pacific typhoon season

Typhoon Ida, also known as the Kanogawa Typhoon (狩野川台風, Kanogawa Taifū), was the sixth-deadliest typhoon to hit Japan, as well as one of the strongest tropical cyclones on record. On September 20, Ida formed in the Western Pacific near Guam. It moved to the west and rapidly intensified into a 185 km/h (115 mph) typhoon by the next day. On September 22, Ida turned to the north and continued its quick rate of intensification. Two days later, the Hurricane Hunters observed a minimum barometric pressure of 877 mb (25.9 inHg), as well as estimated peak winds of 325 km/h (202 mph). This made Ida the strongest tropical cyclone on record at the time, although it was surpassed by Typhoon Nora 15 years later. Ida weakened as it continued to the north-northeast, and made landfall in Japan on southeastern Honshū with winds of 130 km/h (80 mph) on September 26. It became extratropical the next day, and dissipated on the September 28 to the east of the country.

Catastrophic damage was inflicted by the typhoon upon its landfall. Ida caused torrential flooding to southeastern Japan, resulting in over 1,900 mudslides. Damage was estimated at $50 million, and there were 1,269 fatalities, making it one of the deadliest Japanese typhoons. The typhoon was regarded as the worst to strike Japan since the 1934 Muroto typhoon. Following the storm, the United States military provided relief effort to the affected regions.

== Meteorological history ==
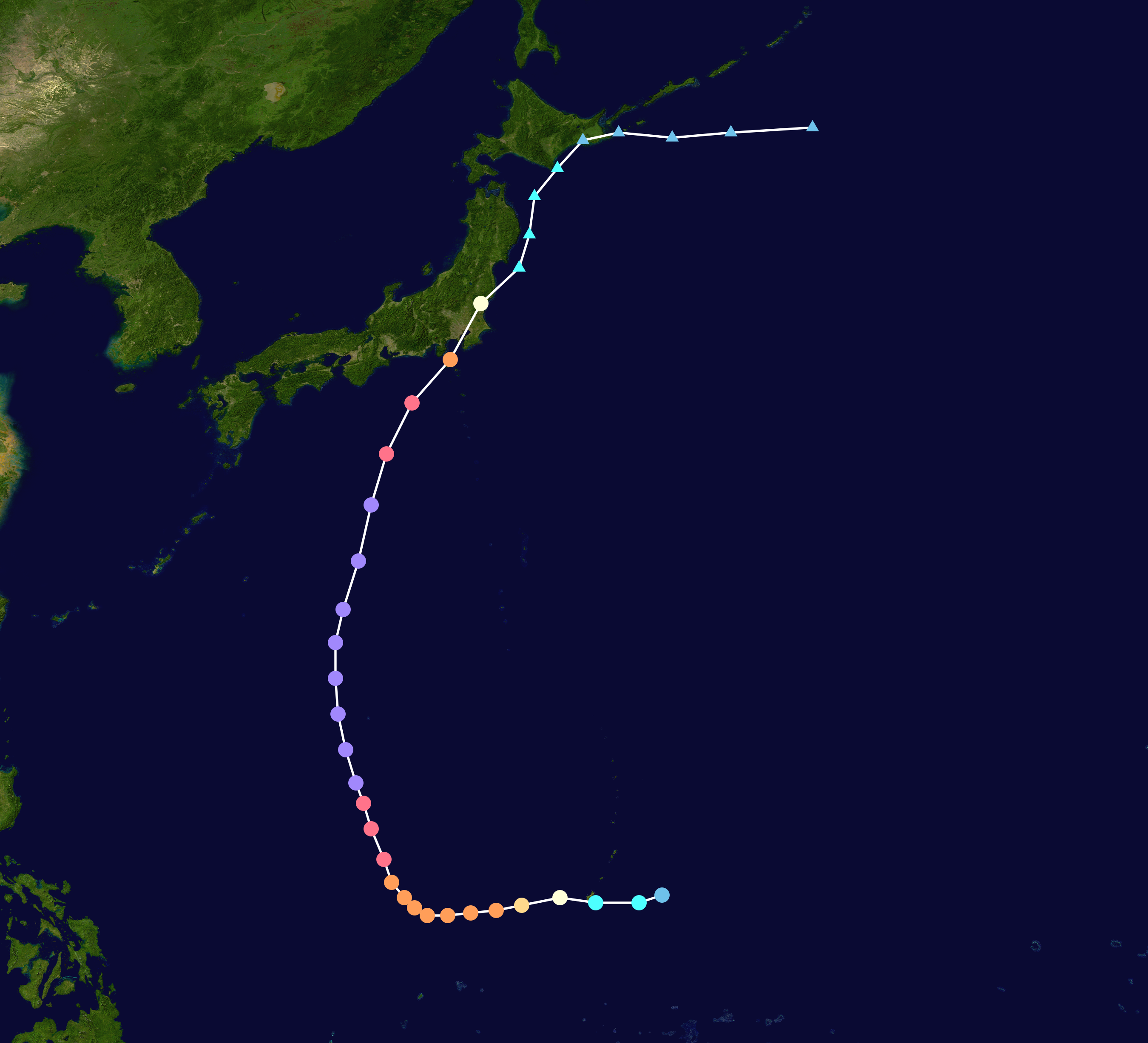
Map plotting the storm's track and intensity, according to the Saffir–Simpson scale Map key Saffir–Simpson scale Tropical depression (≤38 mph, ≤62 km/h) Tropical storm (39–73 mph, 63–118 km/h) Category 1 (74–95 mph, 119–153 km/h) Category 2 (96–110 mph, 154–177 km/h) Category 3 (111–129 mph, 178–208 km/h) Category 4 (130–156 mph, 209–251 km/h) Category 5 (≥157 mph, ≥252 km/h) Unknown Storm type Tropical cyclone Subtropical cyclone Extratropical cyclone, remnant low, tropical disturbance, or monsoon depression

Tropical Storm Ida formed east of Guam on September 20, 1958. The storm moved westward, crossing the island as it gradually intensified into a typhoon. On September 22, Ida began a motion to the north, following a path typical of September typhoons. Around that time, the Hurricane Hunters reported that the eye was obscured, and over the subsequent 24 hours the eyewall remained incomplete. However, over a 14-hour period beginning at 15:00 UTC on September 23, Typhoon Ida began undergoing rapid deepening, at times a rate of 5.8 mbar (0.17 inHg) per hour. The eye became increasingly well-defined, and near 05:00 UTC on September 24, a reconnaissance aircraft deployed a dropsonde in the typhoon about 600 mi (970 km) northwest of Guam. The instrument recorded a barometric pressure of 877 mbar (25.9 inHg), which made Ida the strongest tropical cyclone on record at the time as measured by pressure.

Most intense tropical cyclones
	Cyclone	Season	Basin	Pressure	
	Cyclone	Season	Basin	hPa	inHg
1	Tip	1979	W. Pacific	870	25.7
2	Patricia	2015	E. Pacific	872	25.7
3	June	1975	W. Pacific	875	25.8
3	Nora	1973	W. Pacific	875	25.8
5	Forrest	1983	W. Pacific	876	25.9
6	Ida	1958	W. Pacific	877	25.9
7	Rita	1978	W. Pacific	878	26.0
8	Kit	1966	W. Pacific	880	26.0
8	Vanessa	1984	W. Pacific	880	26.0
10	Nancy	1961	W. Pacific	882	26.4
10	Wilma	2005	Atlantic	882	26.4
Source: JMA Typhoon Best Track Analysis. National Hurricane Center Tropical Cyclone Reports.

Around the time of its lowest pressure, the Hurricane Hunters estimated flight-level winds of 345 km/h (214 mph). The reconnaissance flight observed a surface temperature in the eye of 33 °C (91 °F) with 50% humidity; such a warm and dry eye was rather unusual for being located over the open ocean. By less than 36 hours after its peak intensity, aircraft reported that the eye had become filled with clouds, which indicated weakening. Ida's winds gradually decreased, and the typhoon struck Japan in southeastern Honshu on September 26 with winds of 190 km/h (120 mph) and a minimum pressure of 949 millibars (28.0 inHg). The typhoon crossed the eastern portion of the country and emerged from Fukushima Prefecture into the Pacific Ocean. Early on September 27, Ida became extratropical, and its remnants moved through Sapporo and the Kuril Islands before dissipating late on September 28.

=== Records ===
When the Hurricane Hunters reported Ida's lowest pressure, the measurement was 10 mb (0.30 inHg) lower than the previous record of 887 mbar (26.2 inHg), set by a typhoon in 1927. Ida retained its status as the most intense typhoon until 1973, when Typhoon Nora attained the same minimum pressure. In November 1975, Typhoon June surpassed both and attained a minimum pressure of 875 mbar (25.8 inHg). Typhoon Tip in October 1979 became the strongest on record with a minimum pressure of 870 mbar (26 inHg), which remains the record.

== Impact ==
=== Japan ===
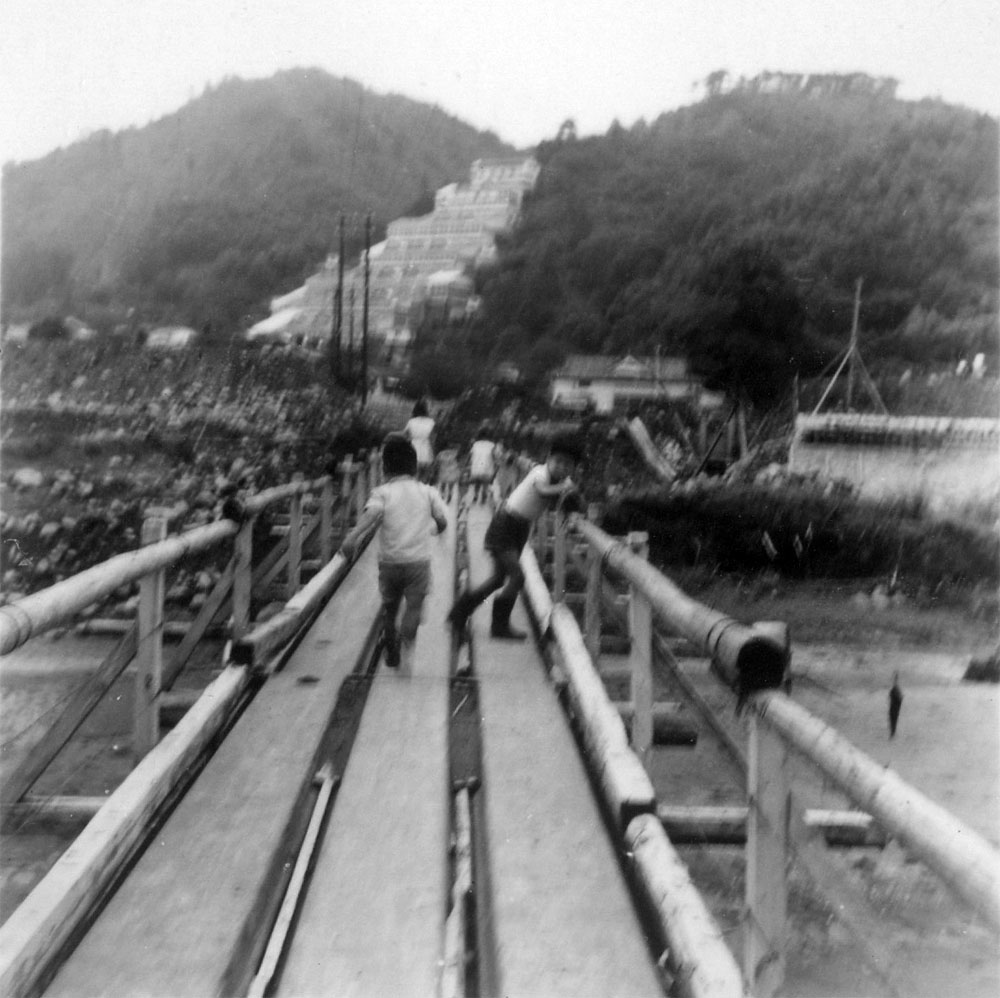
Damage from Ida in Izunokuni, Shizuoka

While Typhoon Ida was striking Japan, it produced heavy rainfall that reached 748.6 mm (29.47 in) on Mount Amagi on the Izu Peninsula. In the capital city of Tokyo, the storm dropped almost 430 mm (17 in) of rainfall, which was the highest daily total since record-keeping began in 1876. Across the country, the rains caused flooding along the Kano, Merugo, and Arakawa rivers; the flooding of the Kano River destroyed to villages along the Izu Peninsula. The rains resulted in at least 1,900 landslides, including 786 in the Tokyo area. There was a storm tide of 1.1 m (3.6 ft) in Chiba, which flooded 120,000 acres of rice fields. Along the coast, there were 32 ships that were missing or sunk, and another 20 were damaged. In addition to the rains, the typhoon produced winds of up to 160 km/h (99 mph), with gusts of 130 km/h (81 mph) recorded in Tokyo; however, wind damage was minor.

Significant typhoons with special names (from the Japan Meteorological Agency)
Name	Number	Japanese name
Ida	T4518	Makurazaki Typhoon (枕崎台風)
Louise	T4523	Akune Typhoon (阿久根台風)
Marie	T5415	Tōya Maru Typhoon (洞爺丸台風)
Ida	T5822	Kanogawa Typhoon (狩野川台風)
Sarah	T5914	Miyakojima Typhoon (宮古島台風)
Vera	T5915	Isewan Typhoon (伊勢湾台風)
Nancy	T6118	2nd Muroto Typhoon (第2室戸台風)
Cora	T6618	2nd Miyakojima Typhoon (第2宮古島台風)
Della	T6816	3rd Miyakojima Typhoon (第3宮古島台風)
Babe	T7709	Okinoerabu Typhoon (沖永良部台風)
Faxai	T1915	Reiwa 1 Bōsō Peninsula Typhoon (令和元年房総半島台風)
Hagibis	T1919	Reiwa 1 East Japan Typhoon (令和元年東日本台風)

A report by Time Magazine in early October 1958 referred to Ida as the worst Japanese typhoon in 24 years, since the 1934 Muroto typhoon. In the Tokyo area, the storm caused widespread power outages and severely disrupted the transportation system. During the storm, communications were severed with the Izu Peninsula, where damage was heaviest. Across the country, more than 520,000 homes were flooded, which is the most on record. As a result, the Japan Meteorological Agency gave Ida the special local name of the "Kanogawa Typhoon". The typhoon damaged 16,743 homes to some degree, including 2,118 that were destroyed and another 2,175 that were severely damaged. Although it was initially reported that the storm left about 500,000 people homeless, the total was later lowered to 12,000 people left homeless due to the storm. In addition, the typhoon destroyed more than 244 road or rail bridges. Overall damage was estimated at $50 million (1958 USD, $544.6 million in 2024), or 20.6 billion yen. Overall, the typhoon injured 1,138 people and killed a total of 1,269 people. This makes Ida the sixth-deadliest storm in the country, behind Typhoon Ruth in 1951, Typhoon Marie in 1954, Typhoon Ida in 1945, the 1934 Muroto typhoon, and Typhoon Vera in 1959. Included in the death toll were 381 people that were missing and presumed killed.

After the storm subsided, the United States military provided supplies and soldiers to assist in relief work. About 200 firemen along the Kano River assisted in relief efforts.

== See also ==
- Other storms of the same name
- Significant typhoons with special names
- Typhoon Alice (1958)
- Typhoon Hagibis (2019)
