= Typhoon Cora (1966) =

Pacific typhoon in 1966

Typhoon Cora 2nd Miyako-jima Typhoon
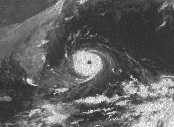
- Satellite image by Nimbus (1 September 1966)

Meteorological history
- Formed: 28 August 1966
- Dissipated: 7 September 1966

Typhoon
- 10-minute sustained (JMA)
- Lowest pressure: 918 hPa (mbar); 27.11 inHg

Category 5-equivalent super typhoon
- 1-minute sustained (SSHWS/JTWC)
- Highest winds: 280 km/h (175 mph)
- Lowest pressure: 917 hPa (mbar); 27.08 inHg

Overall effects
- Fatalities: 272
- Missing: 52
- IBTrACS
- Part of the 1966 Pacific typhoon season

Typhoon Cora, also known as the 2nd Miyako-jima Typhoon (第2宮古島台風) in Japan, was a typhoon that hit the Ryūkyū Islands in 1966.

== Meteorological history ==
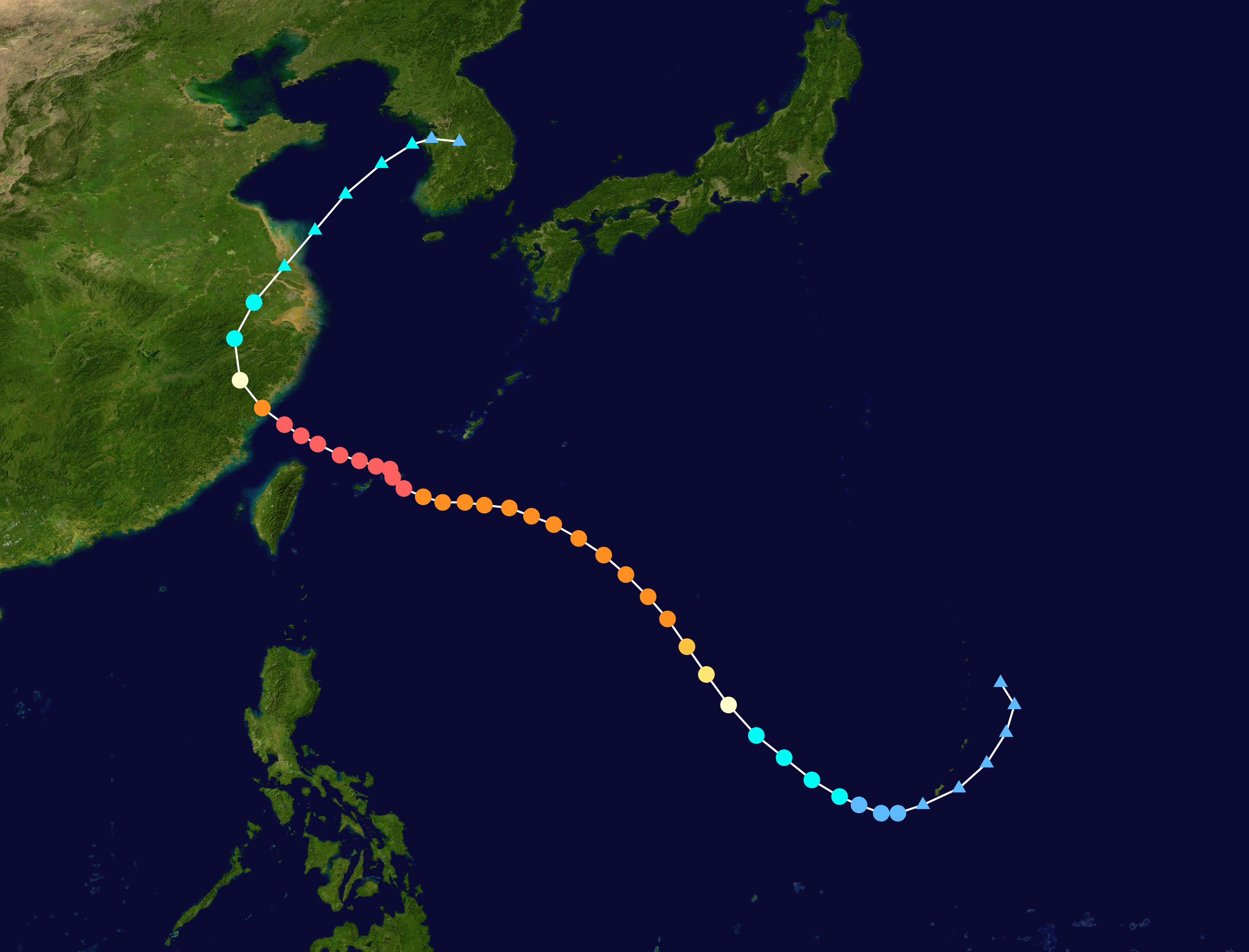
Map plotting the storm's track and intensity, according to the Saffir–Simpson scale Map key Saffir–Simpson scale Tropical depression (≤38 mph, ≤62 km/h) Tropical storm (39–73 mph, 63–118 km/h) Category 1 (74–95 mph, 119–153 km/h) Category 2 (96–110 mph, 154–177 km/h) Category 3 (111–129 mph, 178–208 km/h) Category 4 (130–156 mph, 209–251 km/h) Category 5 (≥157 mph, ≥252 km/h) Unknown Storm type Tropical cyclone Subtropical cyclone Extratropical cyclone, remnant low, tropical disturbance, or monsoon depression

At 18:00 UTC on 28 August, a tropical depression formed just to the east of the Northern Mariana Islands. Although initially drifting southeast, the depression began curving to the southwest early the next day. During the late night of 29 August, it passed over the south tip of Guam and over the Cocos Lagoon. Early in the day on 30 August, the depression slowed its course and began a gentle turn to the west-northwest. By 00:00 UTC on 31 August, the depression attained tropical storm intensity and started moving northwest. Steadily strengthening as it did so, Tropical Storm Cora attained typhoon intensity by 00:00 UTC on 1 September. At that time, Typhoon Cora began a period of rapid deepening: its central pressure dropped 45 millibars (1.3 inHg) in 24 hours, from 970 to 925 mb (28.6 to 27.3 inHg). In the same period, between 00:00 UTC on 1–2 September, Typhoon Cora increased its maximum sustained wind speed from 85 to 145 mph (137 to 233 km/h). Having intensified significantly, Typhoon Cora progressively decreased its forward speed and bent back to the west-northwest over the next 36 hours. During this period, Typhoon Cora attained peak winds equal to those of a minimal Super Typhoon on the Joint Typhoon Warning Center's classification scale. At 12:00 UTC on 3 September, it turned to the west and maintained its wind speed of 150 mph (240 km/h) for another 24 hours. On the night of 4 September, Typhoon Cora began yet another turn to the west-northwest and intensified into what is equivalent of a Category 5 super typhoon on the Saffir-Simpson Hurricane Scale; however, the classification did not exist until the scale was first devised in the 1970s and then used retroactively to rate past storms. Just before midnight UTC on 5 September, Typhoon Cora passed only 5 miles (8.0 km) southwest of Miyako-jima Island, its northern eyewall impacting the island for several hours. During this pass, the central pressure in Typhoon Cora dropped to 918 mb (27.1 inHg), the lowest observed in its life span. However, Typhoon Cora did not reach its maximum wind speed of 175 mph (282 km/h) for another 12 hours, until 12:00 UTC on 5 September.

After peaking at this intensity, Typhoon Cora continued moving west-northwest toward mainland China; around midnight UTC on 6 September, its eye passed 20 mi (32 km) southwest of the Senkaku Islands. Between 12:00 UTC on 5 September and 00:00 UTC on 6 September, Typhoon Cora briefly fluctuated in intensity, its winds alternating between 160–175 mph (257–282 km/h); however, it generally maintained its intensity and remained at Category 5 intensity for one more day, until 00:00 UTC on 7 September, after a total of 42 hours spent at that level. Sometime before 00:00 UTC on 7 September, Typhoon Cora made landfall on Fujian, China, with estimated sustained winds of 160 mph (260 km/h), making it one of only two Category 5 typhoons to make landfall in the People's Republic of China. After making landfall, Typhoon Cora quickly lost typhoon intensity and curved to the northeast. It passed near Jinhua, Hangzhou, and Suzhou; by the time it was nearest Suzhou, it was already a remnant low. On 8 September, the remnant low turned to the northeast, over the East China Sea, and approached the Korean Peninsula. Shortly after 06:00 UTC on 9 September, it struck South Chungcheong Province in the Republic of Korea. Dissipation took place inland, six hours later.

== Preparations and impact ==
Significant typhoons with special names (from the Japan Meteorological Agency)
Name	Number	Japanese name
Ida	T4518	Makurazaki Typhoon (枕崎台風)
Louise	T4523	Akune Typhoon (阿久根台風)
Marie	T5415	Tōya Maru Typhoon (洞爺丸台風)
Ida	T5822	Kanogawa Typhoon (狩野川台風)
Sarah	T5914	Miyakojima Typhoon (宮古島台風)
Vera	T5915	Isewan Typhoon (伊勢湾台風)
Nancy	T6118	2nd Muroto Typhoon (第2室戸台風)
Cora	T6618	2nd Miyakojima Typhoon (第2宮古島台風)
Della	T6816	3rd Miyakojima Typhoon (第3宮古島台風)
Babe	T7709	Okinoerabu Typhoon (沖永良部台風)
Faxai	T1915	Reiwa 1 Bōsō Peninsula Typhoon (令和元年房総半島台風)
Hagibis	T1919	Reiwa 1 East Japan Typhoon (令和元年東日本台風)

As the typhoon approached Okinawa Island, flights to the island were cancelled for five days, stranding about 1,000 U.S. Marines in South Vietnam. The Marines were due to arrive on Okinawa, their staging area, but instead were sent to a camp in Da Nang, part of South Vietnamese territory in 1966.

In the southern Ryukyu Islands, Typhoon Cora was considered the most destructive typhoon in at least 75 years. There, the powerful winds and waves of the storm destroyed 520 homes on the islands of Miyako-jima and Ishigaki. The worst damage occurred on Miyako-jima; the storm also damaged 1,400 homes, leaving 2,363 people homeless. The majority of these were wooden structures whose structures were compromised once their roof was torn off. Steel structures also sustained considerable damage while reinforced concrete buildings fared the best. On the island, a Japanese weather observatory recorded sustained winds of 118 knots (136 mph) (60.8 m/s (219 km/h)), with a peak gust of 166 kn (191 mph) (85.3 m/s (307 km/h)). The peak gust is still the official highest wind speed ever recorded in Japan. The lowest pressure on Miyako-jima island, 928.9 mb (27.43 inHg), was recorded at 10:01 a.m. local time on 5 September. In all, 296.1 millimetres (11.66 in) of rain fell during Typhoon Cora. Additionally, up to five five-ton ships were destroyed and four others reported damaged. The powerful storm, while at peak intensity near Miyako-jima, also destroyed one of two radar bases there, and significant damage to crops was reported; later estimates indicated 70% of the sugar cane on the island was destroyed. Total losses on Miyako-jima and Ishigaki reached $30 million (1966 USD). Only five injuries were reported after Cora.

Slowly moving by the southern Ryukyu Islands, Cora battered the region for more than 30 hours. The resulting effects rendered 6,000 residents homeless. The scale of damage varied across the island with Ueno-mura suffering the most extensive losses. Of the community's 821 homes, 90.1 percent was severely damaged or destroyed. A United States Air Force radar station was destroyed on the island. On nearby Ishigaki Island, where wind gusts reached 162 km/h (101 mph), 71 homes were destroyed while a further 139 were severely damaged.

On nearby Taiwan (then called Formosa), Typhoon Cora produced strong winds along the north coast of the island. Peak winds in Taipei reached 70 mph (110 km/h). Wind gusts up to 130 km/h (81 mph) caused notable damage in Taiwan, with 17 homes destroyed and 42 more damaged. A smaller island closer to the storm reported a peak gust of 226 km/h (140 mph). Heavy rains were generally confined to northern areas of the island, peaking at 405 mm (15.9 in). Three people were killed during Cora's passage while seventeen others sustained injury. Additionally, 5,000 persons were evacuated. Damage amounted to NT$4.2 million. Striking Fujian Province, China, on the heels of Typhoon Alice, Cora exacerbated damage in the region. Property damage was extreme with more than 21,000 homes destroyed and nearly 63,000 more damage. An estimated 265,000 people were severely affected by the storm. A total of 269 people perished during the storm while a further 2,918 were injured; 52 people were also listed missing. Tremendous flooding occurred as a result of the rains from Alice and Cora, damaging 190,000 hectares (470,000 acres) of crops which resulted in a loss of 195,000 kg (430,000 lb) in food production.

The JMA in Japan named the typhoon 2nd Miyako-jima Typhoon.

== See also ==
- Typhoon Sarah (1959) – the JMA named it Miyakojima Typhoon
- Typhoon Della (1968) – the JMA named it 3rd Miyakojima Typhoon
