= List of storms named Babe =

The name Babe has been used for seven tropical cyclones worldwide, one in the Atlantic Ocean and six in the Western Pacific Ocean.

In the Atlantic:

- Hurricane Babe (1977), made landfall in Louisiana as a Category 1 hurricane.

The name Babe was removed from use in the Atlantic (though not retired) when new lists including both female and male names were introduced in 1979.

In the Western Pacific:

- Tropical Storm Babe (1962) (T6218, 67W), landfall in South Vietnam
- Typhoon Babe (1965) (T6507, 09W)
- Tropical Storm Babe (1967) (T6732, 33W)
- Tropical Storm Babe (1971) (T7106, 06W)
- Tropical Storm Babe (1974) (T7403, 03W)
- Typhoon Babe (1977) (T7709, 10W, Miling), Category 4 Super typhoon that passed through the Ryukyu Islands and eventually it made landfall near Shanghai, China

The name Babe was removed from use in the Western Pacific (though not retired) when new lists including both female and male names were introduced in 1979.
