= Typhoon Marie (1954) =

Pacific typhoon in 1954

Typhoon Marie Tōya Maru Typhoon
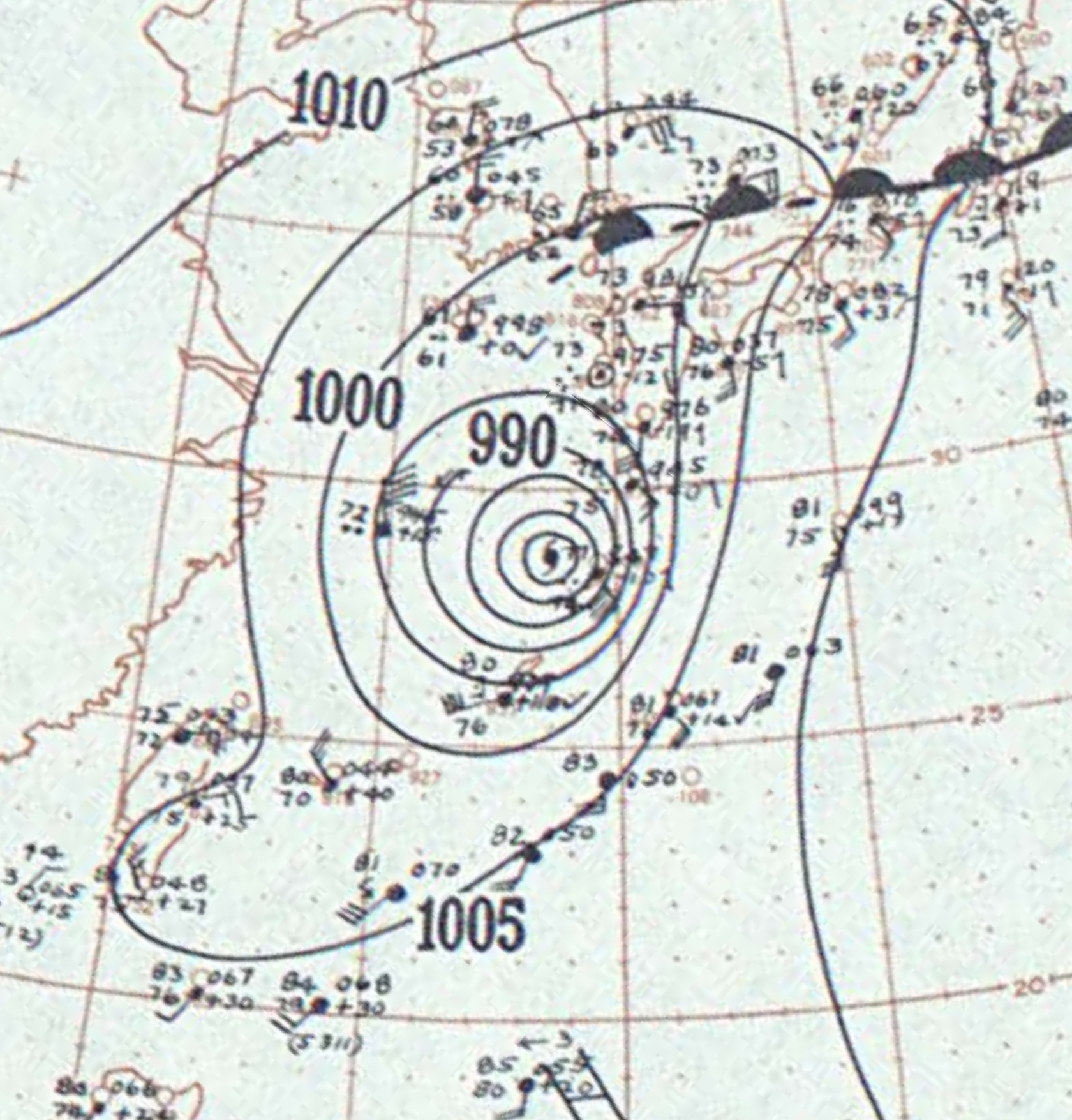
- Surface weather analysis Marie at peak intensity apporaching mainland Japan on September 25

Meteorological history
- Formed: September 19, 1954
- Dissipated: September 28, 1954

Typhoon
- 10-minute sustained (JMA)
- Lowest pressure: 956 hPa (mbar); 28.23 inHg

Category 1-equivalent typhoon
- 1-minute sustained (SSHWS/JTWC)
- Highest winds: 140 km/h (85 mph)

Overall effects
- Fatalities: 1,361
- Missing: 400
- Areas affected: Japan
- IBTrACS
- Part of the 1954 Pacific typhoon season

Typhoon Marie, as known as the Tōya Maru Typhoon (洞爺丸台風) in Japan, was a typhoon that hit Japan in September 1954. Marie did a great deal of damage to Hokkaido, and the Tōya Maru (洞爺丸) train ferry sank due to the high waves and windstorm caused by Marie. Because of it, JMA in Japan named the storm Tōya Maru Typhoon.

== Overview ==
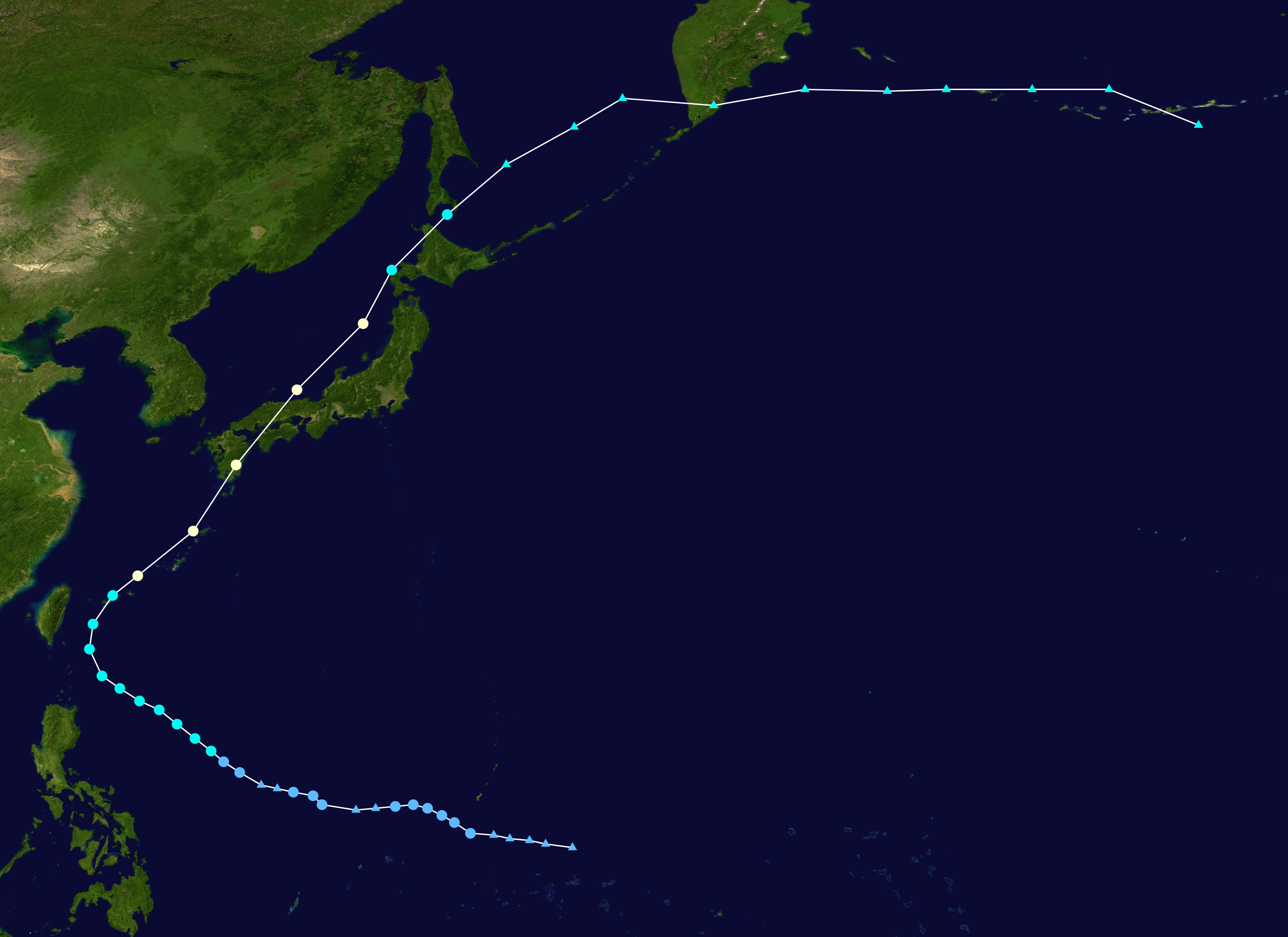
Map plotting the storm's track and intensity, according to the Saffir–Simpson scale Map key Saffir–Simpson scale Tropical depression (≤38 mph, ≤62 km/h) Tropical storm (39–73 mph, 63–118 km/h) Category 1 (74–95 mph, 119–153 km/h) Category 2 (96–110 mph, 154–177 km/h) Category 3 (111–129 mph, 178–208 km/h) Category 4 (130–156 mph, 209–251 km/h) Category 5 (≥157 mph, ≥252 km/h) Unknown Storm type Tropical cyclone Subtropical cyclone Extratropical cyclone, remnant low, tropical disturbance, or monsoon depression

On September 26, Typhoon Marie hit Japan. After passing Kyushu and Chugoku, Marie proceeded through the Sea of Japan northeast at a tremendous speed and hit Hokkaido.

Due to Marie, some Seikan ferries such as Tōya Maru that departed from Hakodate Port, suffered a gale and high waves. Tōya Maru sank, causing 1,139 people on it to die, and resulting in enormous damage.

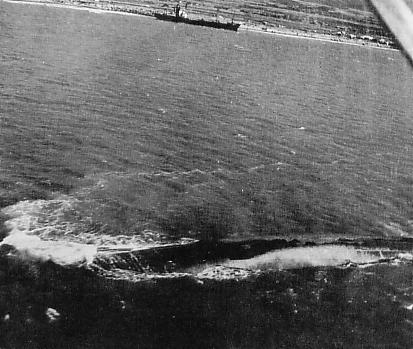
Overturned Tōya Maru

Also, a large fire broke out in Iwanai, Hokkaido, partly due to the effects of Marie. This fire was called Fire of Iwanai (岩内大火) in Japan.

== Name ==
JMA named Marie, which caused major damage mainly in Hokkaido, the Tōya Maru Typhoon, honoring the dead of the Tōya Maru.

Significant typhoons with special names (from the Japan Meteorological Agency)
Name	Number	Japanese name
Ida	T4518	Makurazaki Typhoon (枕崎台風)
Louise	T4523	Akune Typhoon (阿久根台風)
Marie	T5415	Tōya Maru Typhoon (洞爺丸台風)
Ida	T5822	Kanogawa Typhoon (狩野川台風)
Sarah	T5914	Miyakojima Typhoon (宮古島台風)
Vera	T5915	Isewan Typhoon (伊勢湾台風)
Nancy	T6118	2nd Muroto Typhoon (第2室戸台風)
Cora	T6618	2nd Miyakojima Typhoon (第2宮古島台風)
Della	T6816	3rd Miyakojima Typhoon (第3宮古島台風)
Babe	T7709	Okinoerabu Typhoon (沖永良部台風)
Faxai	T1915	Reiwa 1 Bōsō Peninsula Typhoon (令和元年房総半島台風)
Hagibis	T1919	Reiwa 1 East Japan Typhoon (令和元年東日本台風)
