= Typhoon Tip =

Pacific typhoon in 1979

Typhoon Tip (Warling)
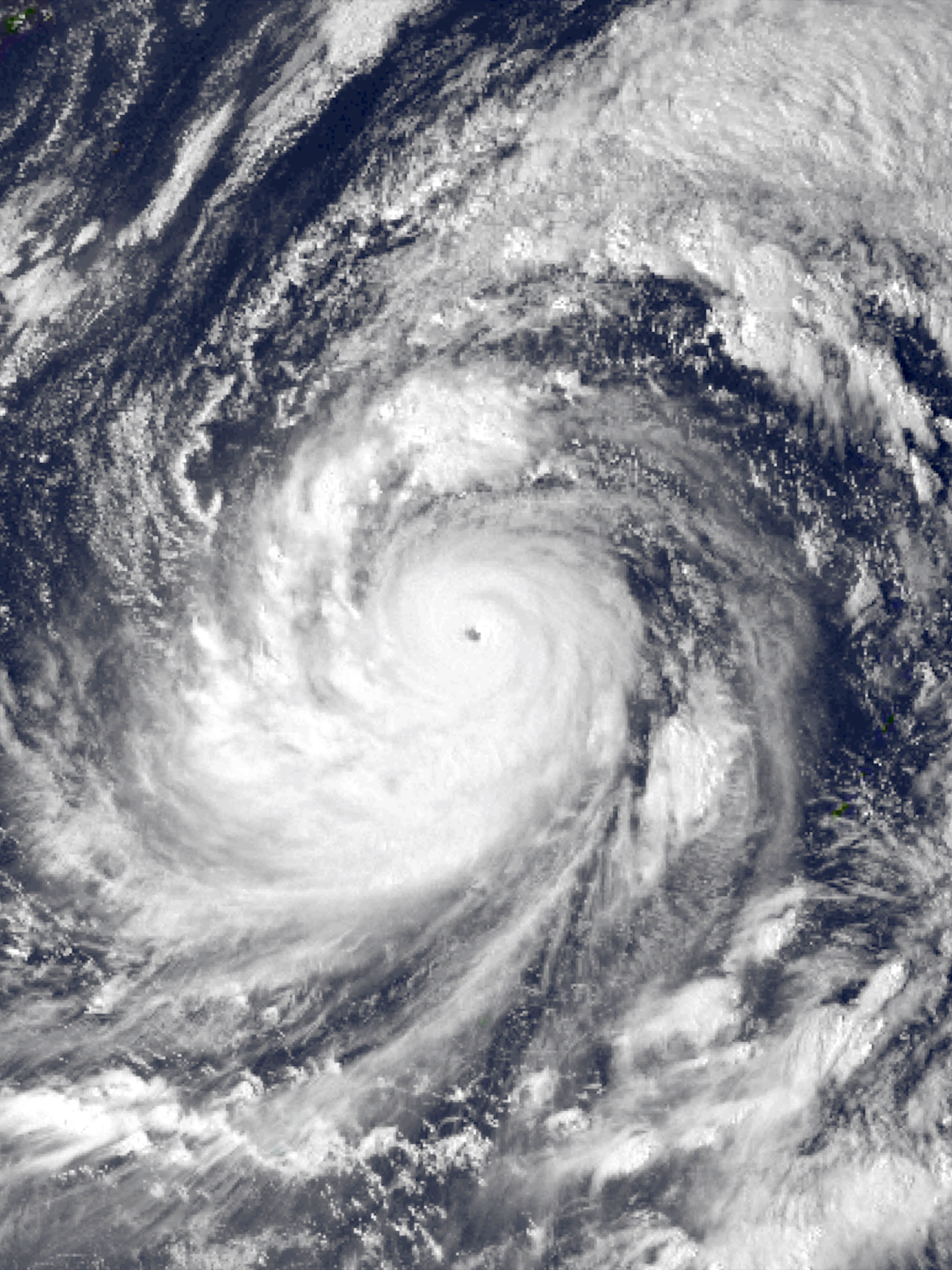
- Typhoon Tip at its record peak intensity on October 12

Meteorological history
- Formed: October 4, 1979
- Extratropical: October 19, 1979
- Dissipated: October 24, 1979

Violent typhoon
- 10-minute sustained (JMA)
- Highest winds: 260 km/h (160 mph)
- Lowest pressure: 870 hPa (mbar); 25.69 inHg (Record lowest worldwide)

Category 5-equivalent super typhoon
- 1-minute sustained (SSHWS/JTWC)
- Highest winds: 305 km/h (190 mph)
- Lowest pressure: 870 hPa (mbar); 25.69 inHg (Record lowest worldwide)

Overall effects
- Fatalities: 99 total
- Damage: $484 million (1979 USD)
- Areas affected: Guam; Philippines; Japan
- IBTrACS
- Part of the 1979 Pacific typhoon season

Typhoon Tip was the largest and most intense tropical cyclone ever recorded worldwide. The forty-third tropical depression, nineteenth tropical storm, twelfth typhoon, and third super typhoon of the 1979 Pacific typhoon season, Tip developed out of a disturbance within the monsoon trough on October 4 near Pohnpei in Micronesia. Initially, Tropical Storm Roger to the northwest hindered the development and motion of the system, although after the storm tracked farther north, Tip was able to intensify due to more favorable conditions within the region. After passing Guam, Tip rapidly intensified and reached peak sustained winds of 305 km/h (190 mph) (Note: All wind speeds in the article are maximum sustained winds sustained for one minute, unless otherwise noted.) and a worldwide record-low sea-level pressure of 870 hPa (25.69 inHg) on October 12. At its peak, Tip was the largest tropical cyclone on record, with a windfield diameter of 2,220 km (1,380 mi). The typhoon briefly entered the area of warning responsibility for PAGASA on October 13, which gave it the Filipino name Warling. Tip slowly weakened as it continued west-northwestward and later turned to the northeast, in response to an approaching trough. After its approach, Tip made landfall in southern Japan on October 19, and became an extratropical cyclone shortly after its landfall. The system's extratropical remnants continued moving east-northeastward, until they dissipated near the Aleutian Islands on October 24.

U.S. Air Force aircraft flew approximately 60 weather reconnaissance missions into the storm, making Tip one of the most closely observed tropical cyclones. Rainfall from the storm indirectly led to a fire that killed 13 United States Marines and injured 68 at Combined Arms Training Center, Camp Fuji in the Shizuoka Prefecture of Japan. Elsewhere in the country, the typhoon also caused widespread flooding and 42 deaths; offshore shipwrecks left 44 people killed or missing.

== Meteorological history ==
Map plotting the storm's track and intensity, according to the Saffir–Simpson scale Map key Saffir–Simpson scale Tropical depression (≤38 mph, ≤62 km/h) Tropical storm (39–73 mph, 63–118 km/h) Category 1 (74–95 mph, 119–153 km/h) Category 2 (96–110 mph, 154–177 km/h) Category 3 (111–129 mph, 178–208 km/h) Category 4 (130–156 mph, 209–251 km/h) Category 5 (≥157 mph, ≥252 km/h) Unknown Storm type Tropical cyclone Subtropical cyclone Extratropical cyclone, remnant low, tropical disturbance, or monsoon depression

At the end of September 1979, three circulations developed within the monsoon trough that extended from the Philippines to the Marshall Islands. The westernmost disturbance developed into a tropical depression on October 1, to the west of Luzon, which would later become Typhoon Sarah on October 7. On October 3, the disturbance southwest of Guam developed into Tropical Storm Roger, and later on the same day, a third tropical disturbance that would later become Typhoon Tip formed south of Pohnpei. Strong flow from across the equator was drawn into Roger's wind circulation, initially preventing significant development of the precursor disturbance to Tip. Despite the unfavorable air pattern, the tropical disturbance gradually organized as it moved westward. Due to the large-scale circulation pattern of Tropical Storm Roger, Tip's precursor moved erratically and slowly executed a cyclonic loop to the southeast of Chuuk. A reconnaissance aircraft flight into the system late on October 4 confirmed the existence of a closed low-level circulation, and early on October 5, the Joint Typhoon Warning Center (JTWC) issued its first warning on Tropical Depression Twenty-Three-W.

Most intense tropical cyclones
	Cyclone	Season	Basin	Pressure	
	Cyclone	Season	Basin	hPa	inHg
1	Tip	1979	W. Pacific	870	25.7
2	Patricia	2015	E. Pacific	872	25.7
3	June	1975	W. Pacific	875	25.8
3	Nora	1973	W. Pacific	875	25.8
5	Forrest	1983	W. Pacific	876	25.9
6	Ida	1958	W. Pacific	877	25.9
7	Rita	1978	W. Pacific	878	26.0
8	Kit	1966	W. Pacific	880	26.0
8	Vanessa	1984	W. Pacific	880	26.0
10	Nancy	1961	W. Pacific	882	26.4
10	Wilma	2005	Atlantic	882	26.4
Source: JMA Typhoon Best Track Analysis. National Hurricane Center Tropical Cyclone Reports.

While executing another loop near Chuuk, the tropical depression intensified into Tropical Storm Tip, though the storm failed to organize significantly due to the influence of Tropical Storm Roger. Reconnaissance aircraft provided the track of the surface circulation, since satellite imagery estimated the center was about 60 km (37 mi) from its true position. After drifting erratically for several days, Tip began a steady northwest motion on October 8. By that time, Tropical Storm Roger had become an extratropical cyclone, resulting in the southerly flow to be entrained into Tip. An area of a tropical upper tropospheric trough moved north of Guam at the time, providing an excellent outflow channel north of Tip. Initially, Tip was predicted to continue northwestward and make landfall on Guam, though instead, it turned to the west early on October 9, passing about 45 km (28 mi) south of Guam. Later that day, Tip intensified to attain typhoon status.

Owing to very favorable conditions for development, Typhoon Tip rapidly intensified over the open waters of the western Pacific Ocean. Late on October 10, Tip attained wind speeds equal to Category 4 strength on the Saffir–Simpson Hurricane Scale (SSHS), and it became a super typhoon on the next day. The central pressure dropped by 92 hPa (2.72 inHg) from October 9 to 11, during which the circulation pattern of Typhoon Tip expanded to a record diameter of 2,220 km (1,380 mi). Tip continued to intensify further, becoming a Category 5-equivalent super typhoon, and early on October 12, reconnaissance aircraft recorded a worldwide record-low pressure of 870 mbar (870.0 hPa; 25.69 inHg) with 1-minute sustained winds of 305 km/h (190 mph), when Tip was located about 840 km (520 mi) west-northwest of Guam. In its best track, the Japan Meteorological Agency listed Tip as peaking with 10-minute sustained winds of 160 mph (260 km/h). At the time of its peak strength, its eye was 15 km (9.3 mi) wide. Tip crossed the 135th meridian east on the afternoon of October 13, prompting the PAGASA to issue warnings on Typhoon Tip, assigning it the local name Warling.

After peaking in intensity, Tip weakened to 230 km/h (145 mph) and remained at that intensity for several days, as it continued west-northwestward. For five days after its peak strength, the average radius of winds stronger than 55 km/h (35 mph) extended over 1,100 km (684 mi). On October 17, Tip began to weaken steadily and decrease in size, recurving northeastward under the influence of a mid-level trough the next day. After passing about 65 km (40 mi) east of Okinawa, the typhoon accelerated to 75 km/h (45 mph). Tip made landfall on the Japanese island of Honshū with winds of about 130 km/h (80 mph) on October 19. It continued rapidly northeastward through the country and became an extratropical cyclone over northern Honshū a few hours after moving ashore. The extratropical remnant of Tip proceeded east-northeastward and gradually weakened, crossing the International Date Line on October 22. The storm was last observed near the Aleutian Islands of Alaska on October 24.

=== Records and meteorological statistics ===
Depictions of Typhoon Tip (left) and Cyclone Tracy, one of the smallest tropical cyclones ever recorded, superimposed on a map of the United States.

Typhoon Tip was the largest tropical cyclone on record, with a diameter of 1,380 mi (2,220 km)—almost double the previous record of 700 mi (1,130 km) in diameter set by Typhoon Marge in August 1951. At its largest, Tip was nearly half the size of the contiguous United States. The temperature inside the eye of Typhoon Tip at peak intensity was 30 °C (86 °F) and described as exceptionally high. With 10-minute sustained winds of 160 mph (260 km/h), Typhoon Tip is the strongest cyclone in the complete tropical cyclone listing by the Japan Meteorological Agency.

The typhoon was also the most intense tropical cyclone on record, with a pressure of 870 mbar (25.69 inHg), 5 mbar (0.15 inHg) lower than the previous record set by Super Typhoon June in 1975. The records set by Tip still technically stand, though with the end of routine reconnaissance aircraft flights in the western Pacific Ocean in August 1987, modern researchers have questioned whether Tip indeed remains the strongest. After a detailed study, three researchers determined that two typhoons, Angela in 1995 and Gay in 1992, registered higher Dvorak numbers than Tip, and concluded that one or both of the two may have therefore been more intense. Other recent storms may have also been more intense than Tip at its peak; for instance, satellite-derived intensity estimates for Typhoon Haiyan of 2013 indicated that its core pressure may have been as low as 858 mbar (25.34 inHg). Due to the dearth of direct observations and Hurricane hunters into these cyclones, conclusive data is lacking. In October 2015, Hurricane Patricia reached an estimated peak intensity of 872 millibars (25.8 inHg), with maximum 1-minute sustained winds of 345 km/h (215 mph), making Patricia the second-most intense tropical cyclone recorded worldwide. However, the NHC noted in their report on the cyclone that Patricia may have surpassed Tip at the time of its peak intensity, as it was undergoing rapid intensification; however, due to the lack of direct aircraft observations at the time of the storm's peak, this possibility cannot be determined.

== Impact ==
=== Guam and the Philippines ===
The typhoon produced heavy rainfall early in its lifetime while passing near Guam, including a total of 231 mm (9.1 in) at Andersen Air Force Base. Gusts of 125 km/h (80 mph) were measured during October 9 at the Naval Base Guam, as the center of the storm was positioned 70 km (43 mi) south of Agana. Tip caused a total loss of nearly US$1.6 million (1979 USD, US$6.93 million in 2024) across Guam. The outer rainbands of the large circulation of Tip produced moderate rainfall in the mountainous regions of the Philippine islands of Luzon and Visayas.

=== Japan ===
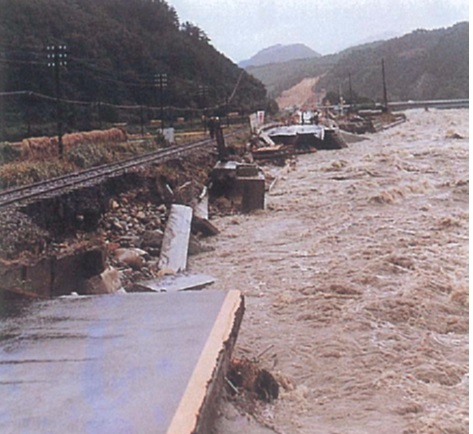
A damage on road collapse from heavy massive rain with flood swept in Sendai river in suburb in Tottori city, western Honshu, Japan on October 1979

Heavy rainfall from the typhoon breached a flood-retaining wall at Camp Fuji, a training facility for the United States Marine Corps near Yokosuka. Marines inside the camp weathered the storm inside huts situated at the base of a hill which housed a fuel farm. The breach led to hoses being dislodged from two rubber storage bladders, releasing large quantities of fuel. The fuel flowed down the hill and was ignited by a heater used to warm one of the huts. The resultant fire killed 13 Marines, injured 68, and caused moderate damage to the facility. The facility's barracks were destroyed, along with fifteen huts and several other structures. The barracks were rebuilt, and a memorial was established for those who lost their lives in the fire.

During recurvature, Typhoon Tip passed about 65 km (40 mi) east of Okinawa. Sustained winds reached 72 km/h (45 mph), with gusts to 112 km/h (70 mph). Sustained wind velocities in Japan are not known, though they were estimated at minimal typhoon strength. The passage of the typhoon through the region resulted in millions of dollars in damage to the agricultural and fishing industries of the country. Eight ships were grounded or sunk by Tip, leaving 44 fishermen dead or unaccounted for. A Chinese freighter broke in half as a result of the typhoon, though its crew of 46 were rescued. The rainfall led to over 600 mudslides throughout the mountainous regions of Japan and flooded more than 22,000 homes; 42 people died throughout the country, with another 71 missing and 283 injured. River embankments broke in 70 places, destroying 27 bridges, while about 105 dikes were destroyed. Following the storm, at least 11,000 people were left homeless. Tip destroyed apple, rice, peach and other crops. Five ships sank in heavy seas off the coast and 50-story buildings swayed in the capital, Tokyo. Transportation in the country was disrupted; 200 trains and 160 domestic flights were canceled. In total, damages associated with Tip in Japan were estimated as ¥105.7 billion (US$482.34 million in 1979 USD, US$2.09 billion in 2024). Tip was described as the most severe storm to strike Japan in 13 years.

== See also ==
- List of tropical cyclone records
- Hypercane
- Typhoon Hagibis - Another Category 5-equivalent Typhoon that took a similar path to Typhoon Tip.
- Hurricane Patricia - The strongest tropical cyclone recorded in terms of maximum sustained winds.
