= Typhoon Sinlaku (2002) =

Pacific typhoon in 2002

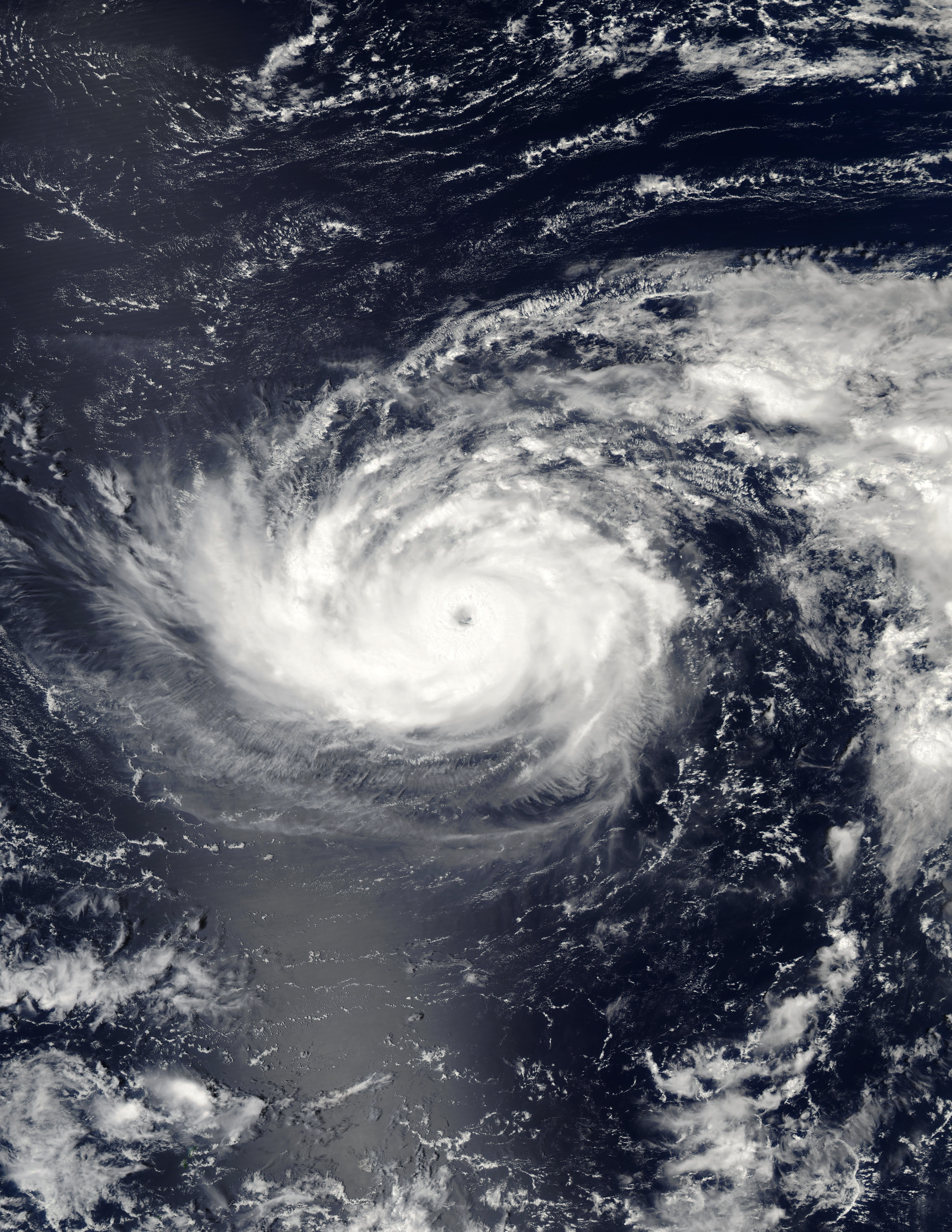
- Typhoon Sinlaku at peak intensity on August 31

Meteorological history
- Formed: August 27, 2002
- Dissipated: September 8, 2002

Typhoon
- 10-minute sustained (JMA)
- Highest winds: 150 km/h (90 mph)
- Lowest pressure: 950 hPa (mbar); 28.05 inHg

Category 3-equivalent typhoon
- 1-minute sustained (SSHWS/JTWC)
- Highest winds: 205 km/h (125 mph)
- Lowest pressure: 933 hPa (mbar); 27.55 inHg

Overall effects
- Fatalities: 30 total
- Damage: $723 million (2002 USD)
- Areas affected: Japan, Taiwan, China
- IBTrACS
- Part of the 2002 Pacific typhoon season

Typhoon Sinlaku (Note: The name Sinlaku (Kosraean: Sinlackuh, [sinlɛkʌ]) was contributed by the Federated States of Micronesia and refers to the goddess of nature and breadfruit of Kosrae.) was a damaging typhoon that affected Okinawa, Taiwan, and eastern China in early September 2002. The 16th named storm of the 2002 Pacific typhoon season, Sinlaku formed on August 27 northeast of the Northern Marianas Islands. After initially moving to the north, it began a generally westward motion that it maintained for the rest of its duration. Sinlaku strengthened into a typhoon and attained its peak winds on August 31. Over the next few days, it fluctuated slightly in intensity while moving over or near the Ryukyu Islands. On September 4, the typhoon's eye crossed over Okinawa. It dropped heavy rainfall and produced strong winds that left over 100,000 people without power. Damage on the island was estimated at $14.3 million. (Note: All damage totals are in 2002 United States dollars unless otherwise noted.)

After affecting Okinawa, Sinlaku threatened northern Taiwan, which was previously affected by two deadly typhoons in the previous year. Officials enacted many preparations, although damage ended up being minimal on the island. Two people were killed on Taiwan, however. Sinlaku weakened slightly before making its final landfall in eastern China near Wenzhou on September 7. There, the storm produced a record wind gust of 204 km/h (127 mph), and just south of the city, high waves destroyed several piers and a large boat. High rainfall and winds from Sinlaku destroyed 58,000 houses, and large areas of crops were destroyed. Damage in China was estimated at $709 million, and there were 28 deaths there.

== Meteorological history ==
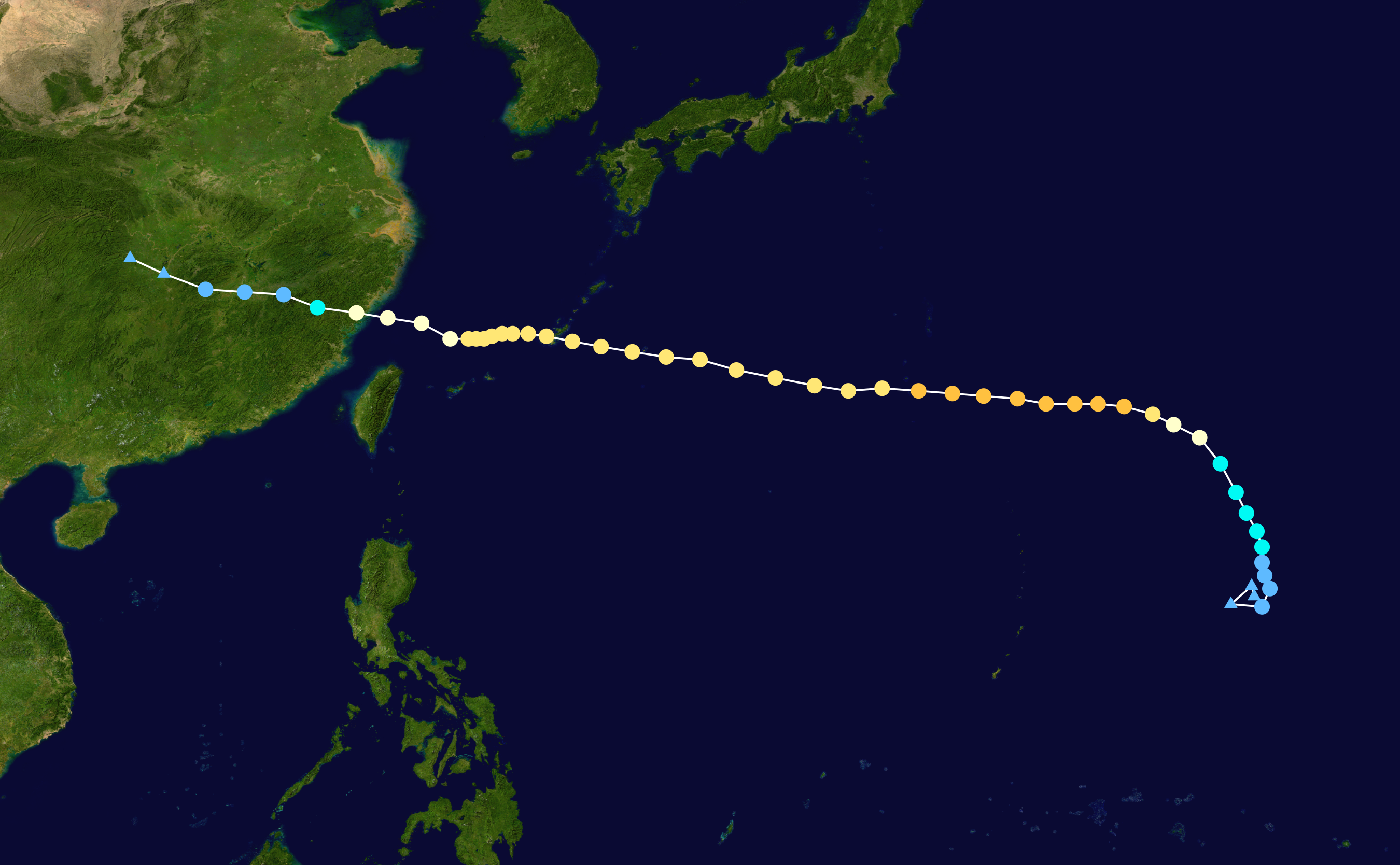
Map plotting the storm's track and intensity, according to the Saffir–Simpson scale Map key Saffir–Simpson scale Tropical depression (≤38 mph, ≤62 km/h) Tropical storm (39–73 mph, 63–118 km/h) Category 1 (74–95 mph, 119–153 km/h) Category 2 (96–110 mph, 154–177 km/h) Category 3 (111–129 mph, 178–208 km/h) Category 4 (130–156 mph, 209–251 km/h) Category 5 (≥157 mph, ≥252 km/h) Unknown Storm type Tropical cyclone Subtropical cyclone Extratropical cyclone, remnant low, tropical disturbance, or monsoon depression

The Joint Typhoon Warning Center (JTWC) (Note: The Joint Typhoon Warning Center is a joint United States Navy – United States Air Force task force that issues tropical cyclone warnings for the western Pacific Ocean and other regions.) began monitoring a tropical disturbance on August 26, noting that an area of convection had an associated circulation. With favorable conditions, the agency assessed a fair potential for development. On August 27, the Japan Meteorological Agency (JMA) (Note: The Japan Meteorological Agency is the official Regional Specialized Meteorological Center for the western Pacific Ocean.) classified the system as tropical depression south of the Japanese island of Minamitorishima, although the circulation was exposed from the convection. The next day, the JTWC initiated warnings on Tropical Depression 22W about 945 km (587 mi) northeast of Saipan, after the thunderstorms began wrapping into the center.

Initially, the depression moved generally northward through a weakness in the subtropical ridge, strengthening into Tropical Storm Sinlaku on August 29. The building ridge, located east of Japan, gradually turned the storm westward. As early as August 29, the JTWC reported that an eye feature was beginning to develop. After further intensification, Sinlaku strengthened, and the JMA upgraded it to a typhoon on August 31; the JTWC estimated Sinlaku attained typhoon status a day earlier.

Shortly after Sinlaku become a typhoon, the JMA estimated it attained peak 10 minute maximum sustained winds of 150 km/h (93 mph). Also on August 31, the JTWC estimated peak 1 minute winds of 205 km/h (127 mph). On September 1, Sinlaku began undergoing an eyewall replacement cycle, although cooler water temperatures caused by previous Typhoon Rusa prevented restrengthening. The typhoon turned more to the west-northwest on September 2, and without much change in intensity, it passed just south of Iwo Jima that day and very near the Japanese island of Minamidaitojima around 2130 UTC on September 3. The next day, Sinlaku also passed just south of Okinawa Island, although its large 110 km (68 mi) eye crossed over the southern portion of the island; the JTWC estimated the storm had winds of 175 km/h (109 mph) while passing near Okinawa. A trough passing north of Sinlaku slowed the typhoon's westward movement. Dry air in the region, and later increased wind shear caused a steady weakening trend. On September 6, Sinlaku passed a short distance north of Taiwan, and subsequently a west-northwest motion resumed. The JMA downgraded the typhoon to a severe tropical storm on September 7 in the East China Sea, although the JTWC maintained it as a typhoon. Around 1030 UTC that day, Sinlaku made landfall in east-central China near Wenzhou, a city near the border of Zhejiang and Fujian provinces. The storm weakened while progressing inland, although its circulation remained well-defined until dissipating on September 9.

== Preparations and impact ==
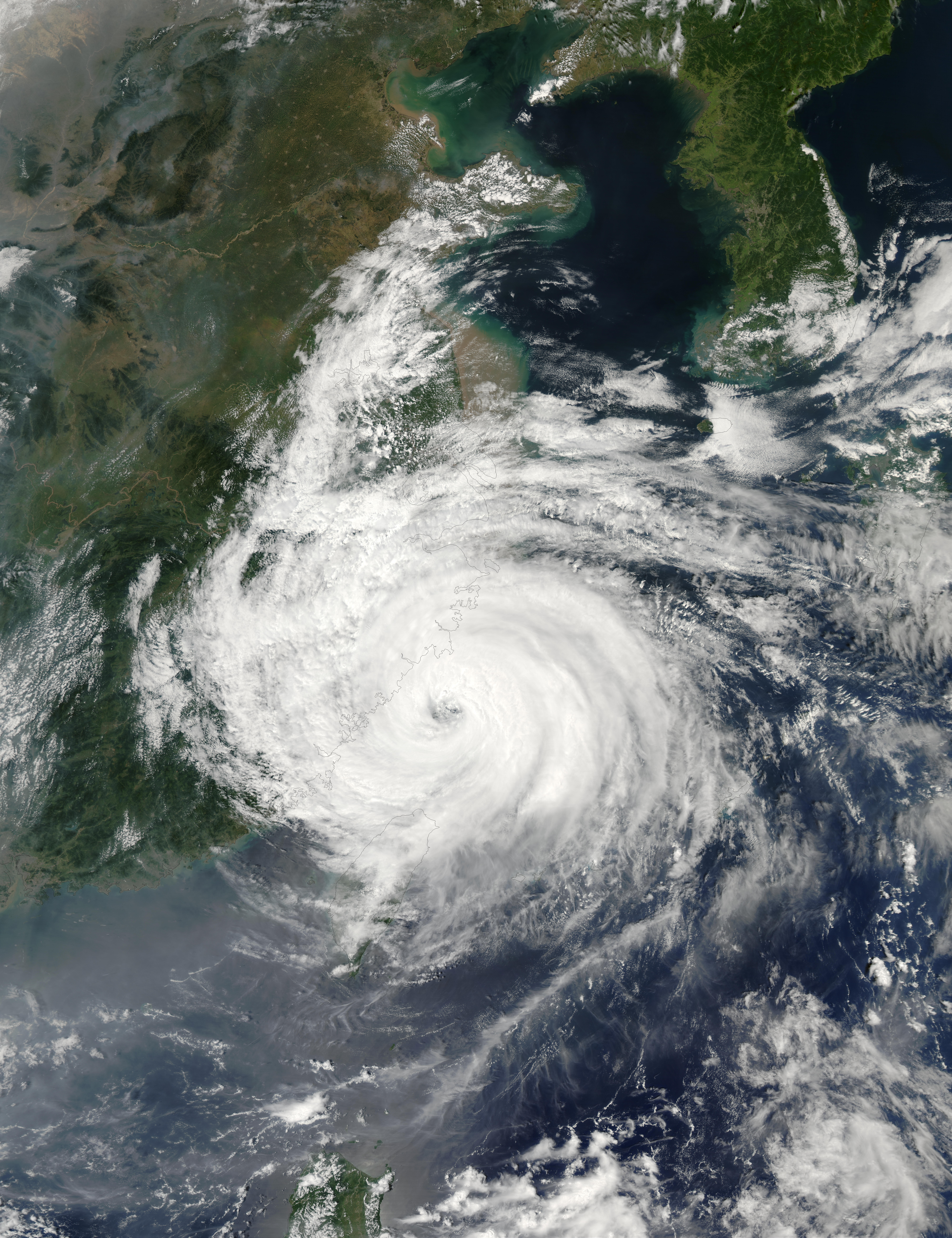
Typhoon Sinlaku approaching East China on September 7

=== Japan ===
Typhoon Sinlaku first affected Iwo Jima, producing sustained winds of 131 km/h (81 mph), with gusts to 183 km/h (114 mph). Residents on the small island of Minamidaitojima evacuated their homes to safer areas during the storm. Rainfall caused flooding on the island. Offshore Okinawa, a Philippine cargo ship went missing, prompting a rescue mission by the Japanese Coast Guard. The crew was rescued a day later, and no one was injured.

Before affecting the island, officials on Okinawa canceled 150 airplane flights and halted bus service. Schools ended early, and only essential personnel were reporting at Kadena Air Base. While striking Okinawa, Sinlaku dropped heavy rainfall, peaking at 453 mm (17.8 in) at two locations. Rainfall spread northward through the Amami Islands, reaching 315 mm (12.4 in) at Yoronjima. The highest hourly precipitation total was 56 mm (2.2 in), recorded at Naha, Okinawa. Sinlaku produced winds as strong as 122 km/h (76 mph), with gusts to 191 km/h (119 mph) on Okinawa. Gale-force winds affected the island for about 21 hours. During its passage, the typhoon destroyed 11 houses and damaged 231 others, and 45 houses were flooded. High winds knocked down power lines, which left 105,500 homes without electricity on Okinawa. Sinlaku injured 31 people, four of them severely, but there were no deaths in Japan. Insured damage in Japan totaled $14.3 million (¥1.7 billion 2002 JPY). (Note: The total was originally reported in Yen. Total converted via the Oanda Corporation website.) Sinlaku left about $3.6 million in damage to Kadena Air Base on Okinawa.

=== Taiwan ===
In Taiwan, the country's Central Weather Bureau issued storm warnings for coastal waters and for areas along the coast. Premier Yu Shyi-kun ordered various government agencies fully prepare for the typhoon, including the activation of a disaster contingency system. The typhoon caused the Taiwan Stock Exchange to close at its lowest level of the year, before the exchange was closed during the storm's passage. Officials also closed schools and government buildings in Taipei, and flights between northern and southern Taiwan were canceled. The typhoon caused a boat race to be delayed by one day. Passing north of Taiwan, Sinlaku dropped about 100 mm (3.9 in) of rainfall in the capital city of Taipei. A station in Ilan County reported a peak rainfall of 387 mm (15.2 in). The high rainfall filled two reservoirs to capacity, both of which had low levels in the previous month. The storm left 200 houses without water, and in Taoyuan County (now Taoyuan City), 700 houses lost power. Storm damage forced about 1,500 people to evacuate their houses. High waves lashed the island's northern coast, forcing hundreds of boats to remain at port. This included thousands of Chinese fishermen who stayed in special shelters, which represented a change in policy; in previous storms Taiwan officials did not allow Chinese fishermen to stay for fear of Chinese emigration to the island. Sinlaku killed two people, one who was swept away by high surf along Taiwan's east coast. However, damage was minor on the island, limited to downed tree branches in Taipei. After the storm, Taiwan residents complained that meteorologists overemphasized the threat of the storm, which was due to heavy damage from typhoons Nari and Toraji.

=== China ===
The threat of Typhoon Sinlaku prompted 640,000 people in eastern China to evacuate, including 48,000 people near Wenzhou who worked on aquaculture farms. About 100,000 troops were put on standby before the storm struck to assist in its aftermath. Eight flights were canceled due to the storm. Upon making landfall, the typhoon dropped heavy rainfall along its path, including a 24‑hour total of 215 mm (8.5 in) where it moved ashore. Several cities reported over 100 mm (3.9 in) in a 12‑hour period. The rainfall caused the Huangpu River to rise to above-normal levels, which prompted officials to close 1,000 floodgates to prevent flooding in Shanghai. In Wenzhou, Sinlaku produced a peak wind gust of 204 km/h (127 mph), which was the highest gust in the city on record. High waves just south of the city, estimated at 16.2 m (53 ft), wrecked five fishing piers and a large boat. Typhoon-force wind gusts were observed along the coast of Fujian and Zhejiang provinces. About 58,000 houses were damaged or destroyed in the two provinces; this included 3,800 destroyed houses in Wenzhou where the storm struck. The high winds downed trees onto power lines, leaving areas without power. About 97,000 hectares (240,000 acres) of crop fields were wrecked. Many schools and businesses were closed during the storm. Overall damage was estimated at $709 million (¥5.88 billion 2002 CNY), (Note: The total was originally reported in Chinese yuan. Total converted via the Oanda Corporation website.) and there were 28 deaths in the country; most of the deaths were caused by collapsing houses. Officials distributed food and thousands of tents and blankets to residents who lost their homes.

== See also ==
- Other tropical cyclones named Sinlaku
- Typhoon Sinlaku (2008) – typhoon of the same name in 2008 that also affected Taiwan.
- Tropical Storm Toraji (2013) – formed in Taiwan and brought few tornadoes.
- Typhoon Fitow (2013) – hit in the same area which brought flash floods.
