= List of storms named Sinlaku =

The name Sinlaku (Kosraean: Sinlackuh, [sinlɛkʌ]) has been used for five tropical cyclones in the western North Pacific Ocean. The name was contributed by the Federated States of Micronesia and refers to the goddess of nature and breadfruit of Kosrae.

- Typhoon Sinlaku (2002) (T0216, 22W) – struck China
- Typhoon Sinlaku (2008) (T0813, 15W, Marce) – struck Taiwan and approached Japan
- Tropical Storm Sinlaku (2014) (T1421, 22W, Queenie) – struck Philippines and Vietnam
- Tropical Storm Sinlaku (2020) (T2003, 04W) – a weak storm that struck southern China and northern Vietnam
- Typhoon Sinlaku (2026) (T2604, 04W) – an exceptionally strong and long-lived Category 5 typhoon which became the third strongest typhoon to hit the Northern Mariana Islands.

Preceded by Nuri	Pacific typhoon season names Sinlaku	Succeeded by Hagupit
