= Tropical Storm Sinlaku (2014) =

Pacific tropical storm in 2014

Tropical Storm Sinlaku (Queenie)
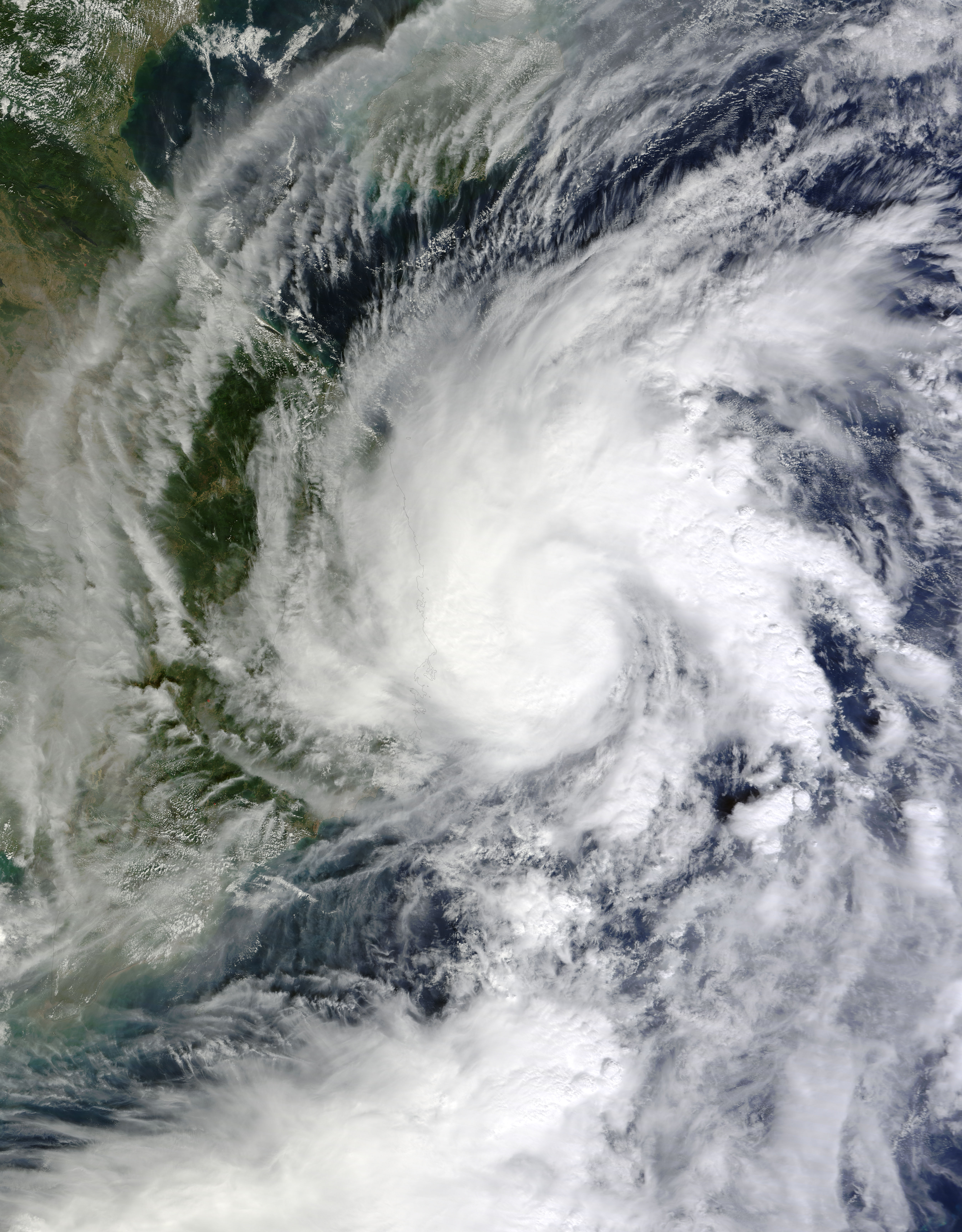
- Tropical Storm Sinlaku at peak intensity approaching Vietnam on November 29

Meteorological history
- Formed: November 26, 2014
- Dissipated: November 30, 2014

Tropical storm
- 10-minute sustained (JMA)
- Highest winds: 85 km/h (50 mph)
- Lowest pressure: 990 hPa (mbar); 29.23 inHg

Tropical storm
- 1-minute sustained (SSHWS/JTWC)
- Highest winds: 100 km/h (65 mph)
- Lowest pressure: 982 hPa (mbar); 29.00 inHg

Overall effects
- Casualties: 4 dead, 8 missing
- Damage: $7.56 million (2014 USD)
- Areas affected: Palau, Philippines, Vietnam, Cambodia, Laos
- IBTrACS /
- Part of the 2014 Pacific typhoon season

Tropical Storm Sinlaku, (Note: The name Sinlaku (Kosraean: Sinlackuh, [sinlɛkʌ]) was contributed by the Federated States of Micronesia and refers to the goddess of nature and breadfruit of Kosrae.) known in the Philippines as Tropical Storm Queenie, was a weak tropical cyclone which affected the Philippines and Vietnam in late November 2014. The twenty-first named storm of the annual Pacific typhoon season, Sinlaku formed as a tropical disturbance east of Mindanao on November 25. The disturbance became a tropical depression on the next day while moving westward, before making landfall in northeastern Mindanao. The depression struck multiple islands in Visayas and Palawan on November 27, before emerging into the South China Sea. Early on November 28, the depression became Tropical Storm Sinlaku while turning west-northwest. Sinlaku strengthened slightly and made landfall in south-central Vietnam on the next day. The storm weakened quickly after landfall, and dissipated early on November 30.

Sinlaku first affected the Philippines as a tropical depression. PSWS were issued over Mindanao, Visayas, and Palawan. Classes in the regions were suspended in advance of the storm. Flights and sea transport were cancelled, resulted in over 4,200 people being stranded. The government evacuated thousands of people in those vulnerable areas. Sinlaku brought strong winds and heavy rains to Mindanao and Visayas. Bohol and Cebu was the hardest-hit province which suffered the most damage. Most of the casualties also occurred there. Sinlaku killed four people, injured two, and eight others went missing. Damage on infrastructure was Php2.66 million (US$60,000).

Sinlaku then struck Vietnam as a high-end tropical storm, also bringing strong winds and heavy rains to the south-central region. Boats were asked to seek shelter in advance of the storm. Military people were mobilized to prepare for any rescue. Downed trees blocked the roads in Quy Nhon. Embarkments in Phú Yên province were destroyed by high waves. The province also reported some minor flooding and power outages. Phú Yên province and Bình Định province suffered from extensive crop damage. Across the country, nearly 500 houses were damaged or destroyed. No casualties were reported, though Sinlaku caused a damage of VND160 billion (US$7.5 million).

== Meteorological history ==
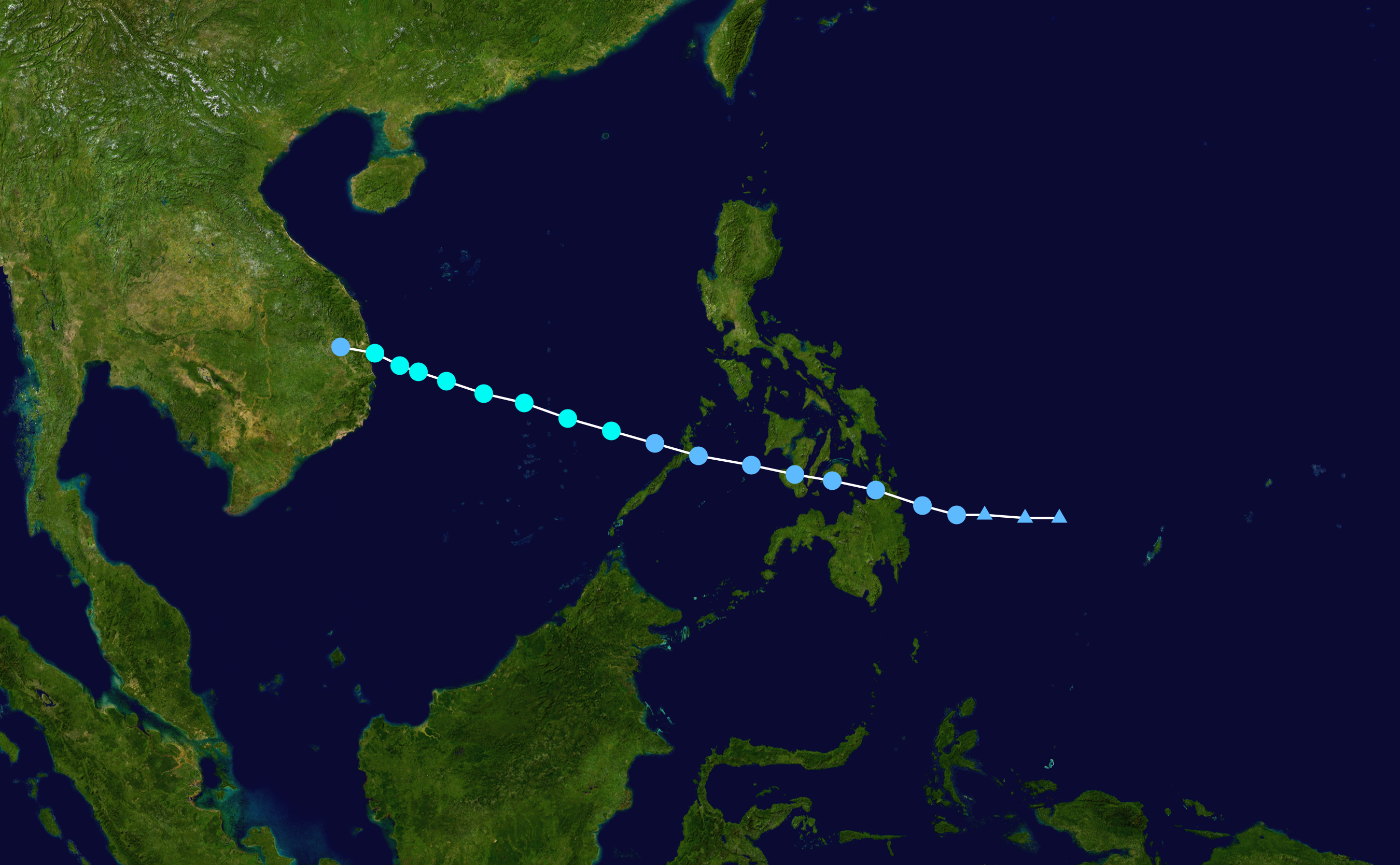
Map plotting the storm's track and intensity, according to the Saffir–Simpson scale Map key Saffir–Simpson scale Tropical depression (≤38 mph, ≤62 km/h) Tropical storm (39–73 mph, 63–118 km/h) Category 1 (74–95 mph, 119–153 km/h) Category 2 (96–110 mph, 154–177 km/h) Category 3 (111–129 mph, 178–208 km/h) Category 4 (130–156 mph, 209–251 km/h) Category 5 (≥157 mph, ≥252 km/h) Unknown Storm type Tropical cyclone Subtropical cyclone Extratropical cyclone, remnant low, tropical disturbance, or monsoon depression

On November 25, a tropical disturbance formed to the east of Mindanao. The Philippine Atmospheric, Geophysical and Astronomical Services Administration (PAGASA) assigned the local name Queenie and began issuing warnigns to the system. At 00:00 UTC November 26, the Japan Meteorological Agency (JMA) upgraded the disturbance to a tropical depression. The Joint Typhoon Warning Center (JTWC) issued a Tropical Cyclone Formation Alert (FCFA) a few hours later, as banding features began to form over the center. At 09:00 UTC, the JTWC upgraded it to a tropical depression, and designated it as 21W. The system moved westward as steered by a subtropical ridge to its north. At 6 p.m. PST (10:00 UTC), Queenie made landfall in Tandag, Surigao del Sur. Queenie made the second landfall at 1:25 a.m. PST November 27 (17:25 UTC November 26) in Loay, Bohol, before striking Oslob, Cebu shortly afterwards. The system made the fourth landfall in Bais, Negros Oriental at 5:15 a.m. PST November 27 (21:15 UTC November 26), and emerged into the Sulu Sea. Despite land interaction, the convection only weakened slightly, and the center remained well-defined. Queenie made the fifth landfall over northern Palawan late on November 27, before emerged into the South China Sea.

After multiple landfalls in the Philippines, the center became ill-defined and only isolated deep convection persisted over the center. However, good poleward outflow and moderate wind shear allowed the system to gradually strengthen. It turned west-northwest along the southwestern edge of a subtropical ridge. Despite remained poorly organized, the convection increased over the northern part of the center, which promoted the JMA upgraded the system to a tropical storm, and named it Sinlaku at 00:00 UTC November 28, and the JTWC followed suit three hours later. Sinlaku left the Philippine Area of Responsibility (PAR) later that day, and the PAGASA issued its final warning to the system. Spiral banding wrapped into the center, as benefited from decreasing wind shear and good poleward outflow, while most of the deep convection was over the northeast quadrant of the center. Sinlaku continued to strengthen, and attained peak intensity at 00:00 UTC November 29, with sustained winds of 85 km/h (50 km/h) and a barometric pressure of 990 hPa (29.23 inHg), though operationally Sinlaku peaked as a severe tropical storm at 12:00 UTC. As Sinlaku continued to move west-northwest, wind shear increased slightly and the deep convection was sheared to the west. At 10:15 p.m. ICT (15:15 UTC), Sinlaku made landfall in northern Phú Yên province, near Sông Cầu. Sinlaku weakened immediately after landfall, convection became shallow, and the JTWC issued the final warning to the system later that day. At 06:00 UTC November 30, the JMA downgraded Sinlaku to a tropical depression, and the system dissipated just six hours later.

== Preparations and impact ==
=== Philippines ===
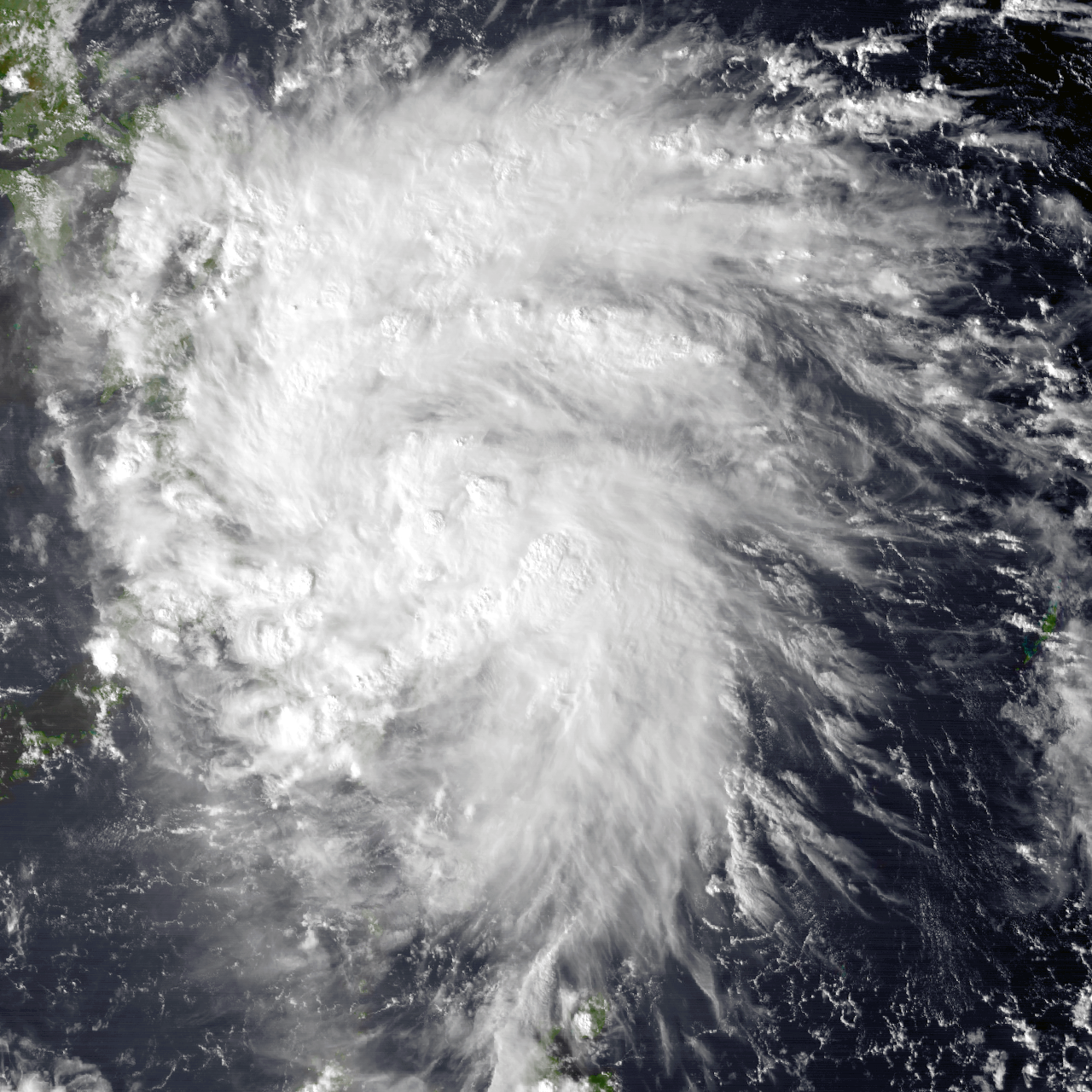
Tropical Depression Sinlaku approaching Mindanao on November 26

Shortly after being classified as a tropical depression, the PAGASA issued the PSWS #1 for provinces in Eastern Visayas, Central Visayas, Caraga, Davao Region, Northern Mindanao, and the Zamboanga Peninsula. As Sinlaku moved westward, the PSWS #1 extended to provinces in Central Visayas and Palawan on November 27. The PAGASA gradually lifted the PSWS as Sinlaku began to move away from the country. All the PSWS were cancelled on November 28, after Sinlaku exited the PAR. School classes in Cebu, Misamis Oriental, Cagayan de Oro, Compostela Valley, and Tagum were suspended on November 26 in advance of Sinlaku. Classes and works were also suspended in Dinagat Islands on that day. Fishermen and small boats were urged not to go out in Eastern Visayas and Mindanao. At least 500 people were stranded in ports of Western Visayas due to transport cancellation. A total of 4,229 people were stranded in different ports across the country.

Despite remained weak while hitting the Philippines, Sinlaku still brought strong winds and rains to the south-central part of the country. Rains caused flash flood in Tandag, Cagwait, San Miguel and Tago, Surigao del Sur. 25 families in Butuan and 274 people in Surigao City were evacuated. Heavy rains in Davao City triggered flooding and inundated roads in the city. In Cagayan de Oro, flooding forced 500 people to evacuate. 296 people in Talisayan and 70 people in Tagoloan were evacuated in advance of the storm. 35 people were rescued from their house as they were trapped by floodwaters. Multiple towns in Bohol suffered from power outages. Strong winds and heavy rains battering Jagna and Cortes. People lived in coastal regions were evacuated. A crewman from a cargo ship drowned in Jagna, after being knocked out by strong winds and fell to the sea. In President Carlos P. Garcia, 2,000 kg (4,400 lb) of seaweeds were destroyed by Sinlaku. Strong winds and heavy rains also downed trees and blocked roads in Cebu. Landslides and power outages were reported in the province. In Argao, floodwaters were chest-deep, which prompted 100 people to evacuate, while floodwaters in Malabuyoc reached waist-deep, also led to evacuation of people who lived there. A boy climbed a coconut tree to flee from the flooding, though his mother was found dead after the floods. Another man drowned in Liloan. A fisherman was missing off the coast of Oslob. Over 2,000 people were evacuated in Dumaguete and Tayasan, Negros Oriental, while 2,600 Girl Scouts evacuated from a campsite in Silay, Negros Occidental. Sinlaku killed four people, injured two, and eight others were missing across the country. 3,742 houses were damaged by the storm, in which 343 of them were destroyed. Infrastructural damage amounted to Php2.66 million (US$60,000).

=== Vietnam ===
Sinlaku brought strong winds and heavy rains to the south-central coast of Vietnam. The regions experienced strong breeze winds of 39–49 km/h (24–30 mph), with gusts reaching gale-force. Waves of 2–4 m (6.6–13.1 ft) also affecting the region. In Khánh Hòa province, the provincial government held an urgent meeting on November 29 to prepare for the storm. The government asked 624 boats carrying 3,600 people to find shelters, while 56 boats carrying 500 people in Trường Sa district had been shifted south to flee Sinlaku. Citizens and tourists were urged not to swim at the beach in Nha Trang, as waves became stronger. The government of Phú Yên province mobilized 3,866 military people and 150 rescue teams to prepare for any rescue. The military distributed 5,000 sandbags to those flood-prone regions in the province.

Strong winds from Sinlaku knocked 15 trees downed and blocked roads in Quy Nhon. Over 100 workers were mobilized to remove the tree debris. A fishing boat was caught by strong winds and high waves off the Lý Sơn Island, but savers were unable to rescue them due to adverse weather. The Maritime Search and Rescue Coordination Center rescued 2 crewmen from the Cosco Prince Rupert, a container ship from Hong Kong. Phú Yên province suffered from minor flooding and power outages. Hundreds of meters of embankments were damaged by high waves and collapsed. 542 ha (1,340 acres) of rice and 274 ha (680 acres) of crops were flooded or damaged in the province. In Bình Định province, 2,137 ha (5,280 acres) of rice seedling were flooded, while 170 t (370,000 lb) of rice seedlings were damaged. Preliminary damage from the two provinces was calculated at VND90 billion (US$4.2 million). Across the country, 151 houses were collapsed after the storm while 340 others were damaged. Ten fishing vessels were damaged. No fatalities and injures were reported, though the total loss of Sinlaku reached VND160 billion (US$7.5 million).

== See also ==
- Other tropical cyclones named Sinlaku
- Other tropical cyclones named Queenie
- Typhoon Lingling (2001)
- Tropical Storm Chanthu (2004)
- Typhoon Mirinae (2009)
- Typhoon Damrey (2017)
- Tropical Storm Matmo (2019)
- Tropical Storm Etau (2020)
