= List of storms named Hagupit =

The name Hagupit (Tagalog: hagupit, [hɐ.ɣʊ.ˈpɪt̚], ha-goo-PIT) has been used to name five tropical cyclones in the western North Pacific Ocean. The name was contributed by the Philippines and means "lashing" or "whipping" in Tagalog.

- Tropical Storm Hagupit (2002) (T0218, 23W) – made landfall west of Macau
- Typhoon Hagupit (2008) (T0814, 18W, Nina) – a strong Category 4 typhoon that made landfall in Guangdong province, China
- Typhoon Hagupit (2014) (T1422, 22W, Ruby) – a Category 5 super typhoon that traversed the Philippines
- Typhoon Hagupit (2020) (T2004, 03W, Dindo) – a moderate Category 1 typhoon that made landfall in Zhejiang, China
- Tropical Storm Hagupit (2026) (T2605, 05W, Caloy) – a very long-lived yet quite weak tropical storm that minimally affected Yap.

Preceded by Sinlaku	Pacific typhoon season names Hagupit	Succeeded by Jangmi
