= Typhoon Herb =

Pacific typhoon in 1996

Typhoon Herb (Huaning)
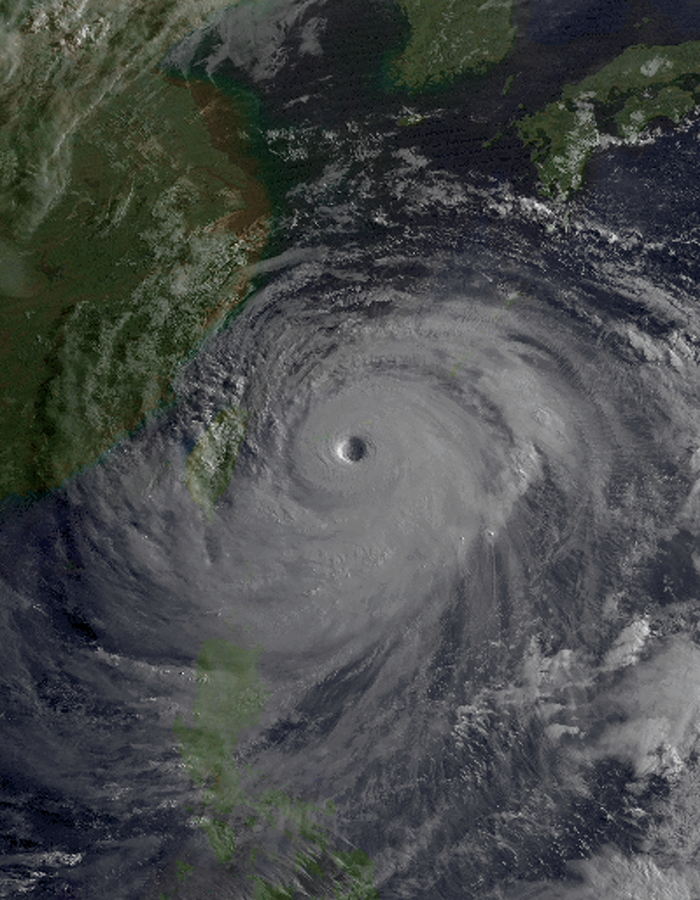
- Herb at peak intensity approaching Taiwan on July 30

Meteorological history
- Formed: July 21, 1996
- Dissipated: August 3, 1996

Very strong typhoon
- 10-minute sustained (JMA)
- Highest winds: 175 km/h (110 mph)
- Lowest pressure: 925 hPa (mbar); 27.32 inHg

Category 5-equivalent super typhoon
- 1-minute sustained (SSHWS/JTWC)
- Highest winds: 260 km/h (160 mph)
- Lowest pressure: 898 hPa (mbar); 26.52 inHg

Overall effects
- Fatalities: 830 total
- Missing: 306
- Damage: $5 billion (1996 USD)
- Areas affected: Ryūkyū Islands; Taiwan; China
- IBTrACS
- Part of the 1996 Pacific typhoon season

Typhoon Herb, known in the Philippines as Super Typhoon Huaning, was a deadly and destructive tropical cyclone that became the strongest and largest typhoon of that year’s Pacific typhoon season. Herb struck the Ryūkyū Islands, Taiwan and the People's Republic of China, causing major damage. The name Herb was used in the Western Pacific naming list for the first time after the list had been revised earlier in 1996. Despite the damages and number of casualties, the name “Herb” was not retired following the season.

== Meteorological history ==
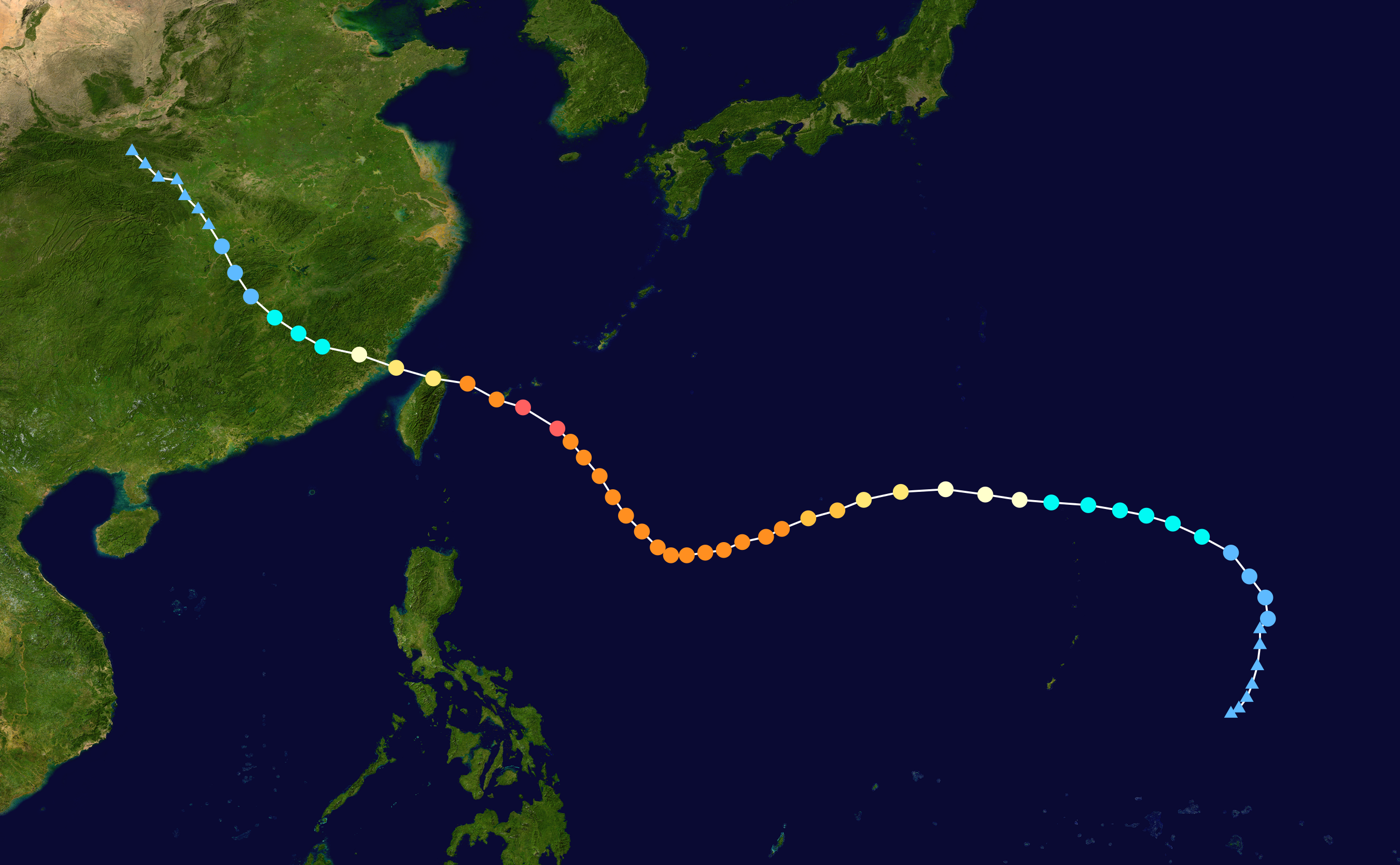
Map plotting the storm's track and intensity, according to the Saffir–Simpson scale Map key Saffir–Simpson scale Tropical depression (≤38 mph, ≤62 km/h) Tropical storm (39–73 mph, 63–118 km/h) Category 1 (74–95 mph, 119–153 km/h) Category 2 (96–110 mph, 154–177 km/h) Category 3 (111–129 mph, 178–208 km/h) Category 4 (130–156 mph, 209–251 km/h) Category 5 (≥157 mph, ≥252 km/h) Unknown Storm type Tropical cyclone Subtropical cyclone Extratropical cyclone, remnant low, tropical disturbance, or monsoon depression

The active monsoon trough that spawned Typhoons Frankie (08W) and Gloria (09W) consolidated into a third area well east of the other two to develop Tropical Depression 10W near Saipan on July 23. It moved northward at first, then westward in response to the subtropical ridge to its north. Tropical Depression 10W intensified into a tropical storm and was named Herb on July 24. Tropical Storm Herb moved west, growing in size and strengthening to typhoon status on July 25 before rapidly intensifying into a Category 4 48 hours later. Herb slightly weakened while it underwent a Fujiwhara interaction with Typhoon Gloria. Shortly afterward Herb began to intensify again, and became a Category 5 super typhoon on July 30, reaching its peak intensity with a barometric pressure of 925 hPa (27.3 inHg) and 10-minute sustained winds of 175 km/h (109 mph; 49 m/s). Herb also became the largest typhoon in July and one of the largest typhoons since 1977.

Herb made its first landfall on the island of Taketomi, in the Ryūkyū Islands, before its second landfall in northern Taiwan as a Category 4 on July 31. The eye of the storm passed directly over the capital, Taipei. Herb weakened as it crossed Taiwan and the Taiwan Strait, to make landfall in China as a strong Category 2. Herb rapidly weakened over the country and dissipated on August 3.

== Impact ==
Wettest tropical cyclones and their remnants in Taiwan Highest-known totals
Precipitation			Storm	Location	Ref.
Rank	mm	in	Storm	Location	Ref.
1	3,060	120.47	Morakot 2009	Alishan, Chiayi	
2	2,319	91.30	Nari 2001	Wulai, New Taipei	
3	2,162	85.12	Flossie 1969	Beitou, Taipei	
4	1,987	78.23	Herb 1996	Alishan, Chiayi	
5	1,933	76.10	Gaemi 2024	Maolin, Kaoshiung	
6	1,774	69.84	Saola 2012	Yilan City	
7	1,725	67.91	Krathon 2024	Beinan, Taitung	
8	1,700	66.93	Lynn 1987	Taipei	
9	1,672	65.83	Clara 1967	Dongshan, Yilan	
10	1,611	63.43	Sinlaku 2008	Heping, Taichung	

=== Ryūkyū Islands ===
Prior to the typhoon's arrival in the southern Ryūkyū Islands, officials issued storm warnings for most islands and canceled 76 flights. On July 31, the eye of Typhoon Herb passed roughly 16 to 20 km (9.9 to 12.4 mi) southwest of Iriomote Island. On the island, a barometric pressure of 927.1 mbar (hPa; 27.38 inHg) was measured. On Yonaguni, a maximum wind gust of 244 km/h (152 mph) was also measured. Widespread damage took place across the southern Ryūkyū Islands, with losses reaching ¥667 million (US$6.2 million). (Note: The total was originally reported in Yen. Total converted via the Oanda Corporation website.) On Ishigaki Island, one home was destroyed and eighteen others were damaged. Extensive losses to agriculture, fisheries, and forestry took place across the region as well. Losses on Ishigaki alone reached ¥630 million (US$5.9 million). In Okinawa, large swells up to 4 m (13 ft) flooded low-lying areas, leaving minor damage.

=== Taiwan ===
In Taiwan, heavy rain from Herb caused flooding and major damage. In Taiwan, at least 51 people were killed and 22 went missing. Herb is the fourth wettest known tropical cyclone to impact the country.

=== Mainland China ===
In China, the code name of the typhoon was "9608", and over 13,000 people were injured or killed, including 779 deaths. Total damage to agriculture and property totaled US$5 billion (1996 dollars).

== See also ==
- Tropical cyclones in 1996
- List of the wettest tropical cyclones
- Typhoon Haitang (2005)
- Typhoon Longwang (2005)
- Typhoon Soulik (2013)
- Typhoon Kong-rey (2024)
