= Typhoon Nuri (2008) =

Pacific typhoon in 2008

Typhoon Nuri (Karen)
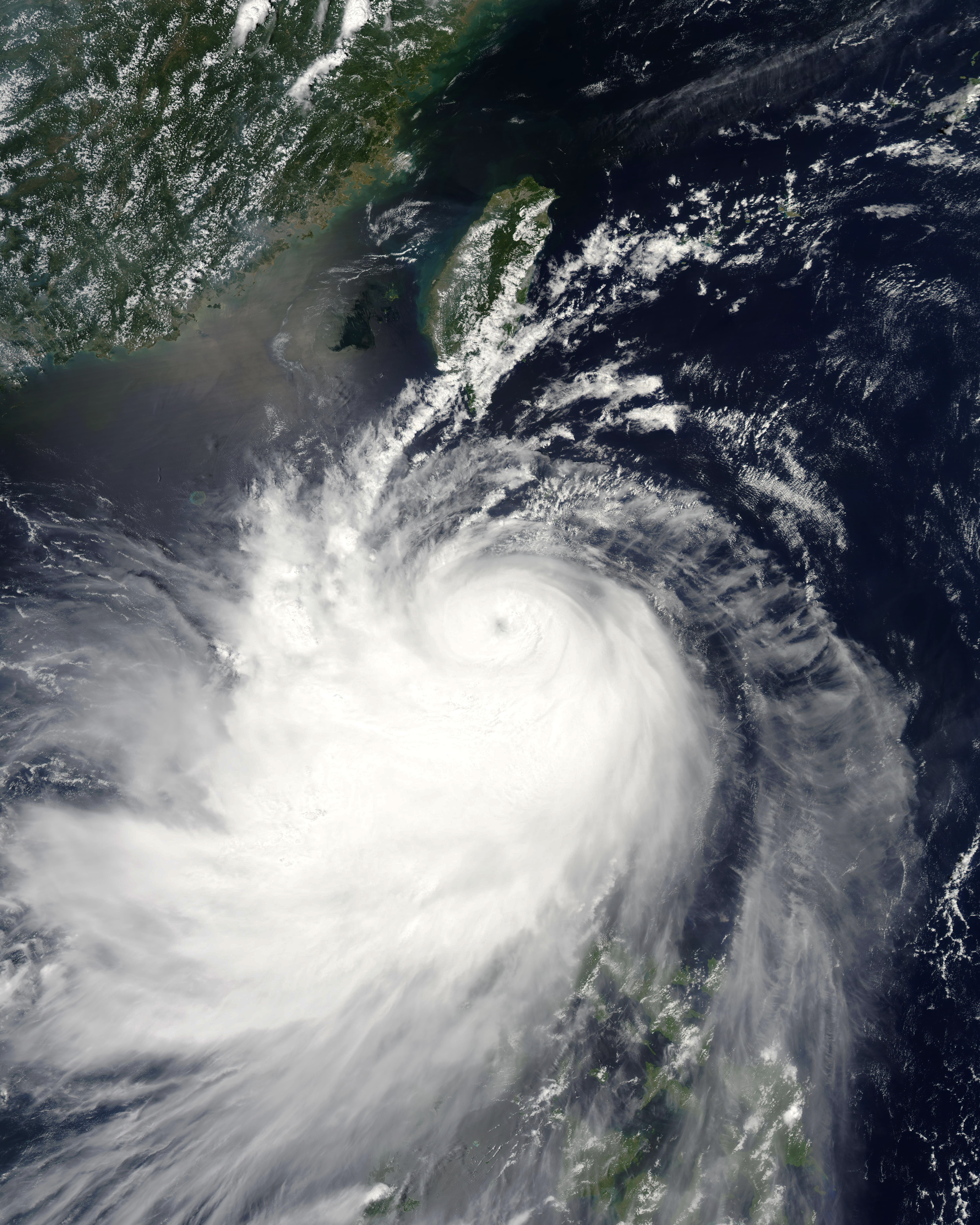
- Typhoon Nuri at peak intensity just north of Luzon on August 20

Meteorological history
- Formed: August 17, 2008
- Dissipated: August 23, 2008

Typhoon
- 10-minute sustained (JMA)
- Highest winds: 140 km/h (85 mph)
- Lowest pressure: 955 hPa (mbar); 28.20 inHg

Category 3-equivalent typhoon
- 1-minute sustained (SSHWS/JTWC)
- Highest winds: 185 km/h (115 mph)
- Lowest pressure: 948 hPa (mbar); 27.99 inHg

Overall effects
- Fatalities: 20 direct
- Missing: 23
- Damage: $85 million (2008 USD)
- Areas affected: Philippines, Mainland China, Hong Kong
- IBTrACS
- Part of the 2008 Pacific typhoon season

Typhoon Nuri, (Note: The name Nuri (Malay: nuri, [nuri]) was contributed by Malaysia and means parrot in Malay.) known in the Philippines as Typhoon Karen, was the twelfth named storm and the seventh typhoon recognised by the Japan Meteorological Agency (JMA). It was the thirteenth tropical depression, the twelfth tropical storm and the eighth typhoon of the 2008 Pacific typhoon season, as per the Joint Typhoon Warning Center (JTWC). The name Karen was assigned by PAGASA to a tropical depression for the second time, the other time being in 2004 to Typhoon Rananim.

Typhoon Nuri formed as a tropical depression on August 17 with the JMA then designating it as Tropical Storm Nuri the next day. It reached typhoon status later that day. Nuri then made landfall in the Philippines as a typhoon on August 20 leaving at least 10 people dead and 11 injured. Nuri then emerged into the South China Sea the next day and started moving towards Southern China. As Nuri moved closer towards Hong Kong, the Hong Kong Observatory issued its Increasing Gale or Storm Signal No. 9 for the first time since Typhoon Dujuan in 2003. It then made a direct hit on Hong Kong as a typhoon. The JMA issued its final warning on August 23 as Typhoon Nuri was moving into Southern China.

== Meteorological history ==
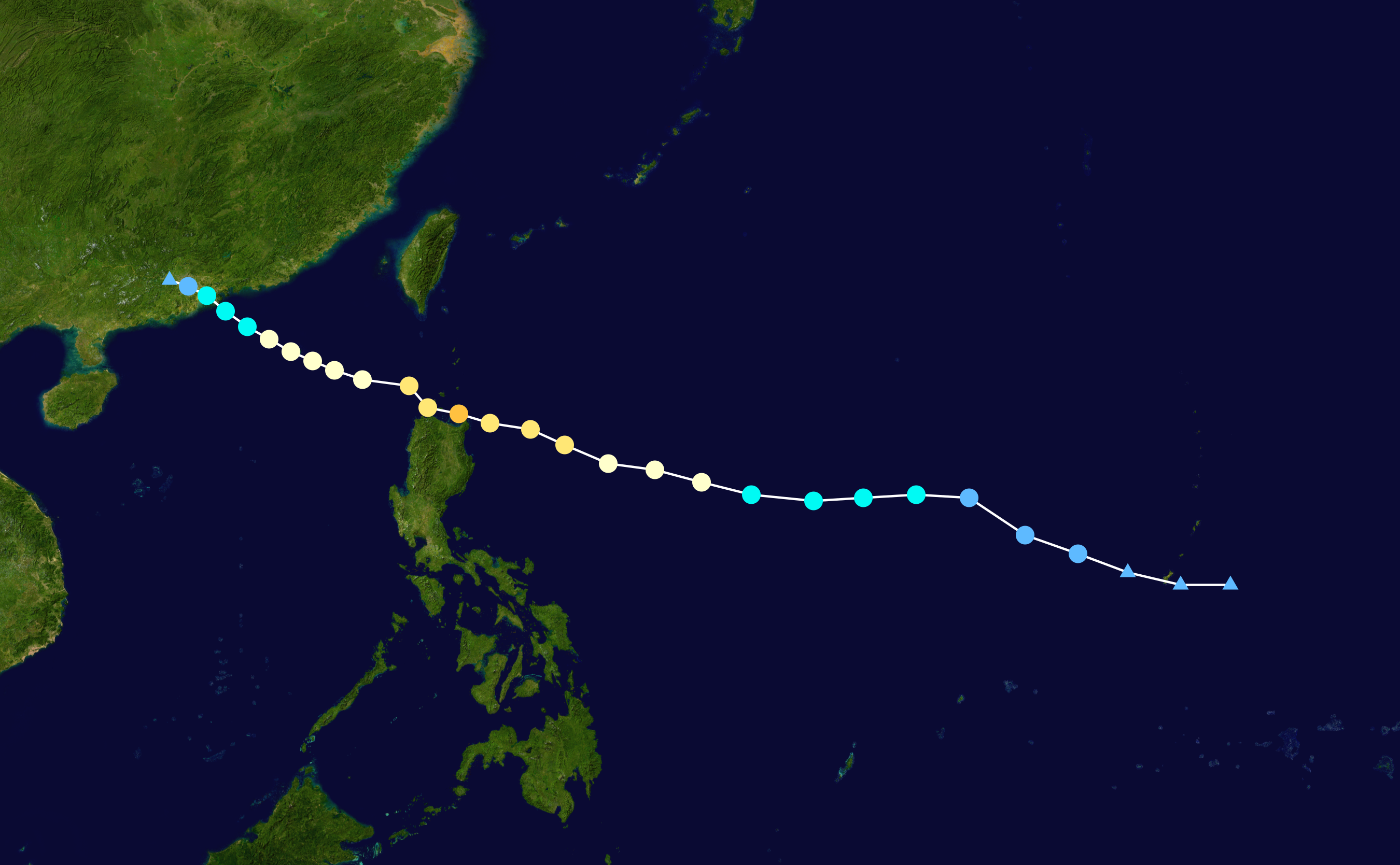
Map plotting the storm's track and intensity, according to the Saffir–Simpson scale Map key Saffir–Simpson scale Tropical depression (≤38 mph, ≤62 km/h) Tropical storm (39–73 mph, 63–118 km/h) Category 1 (74–95 mph, 119–153 km/h) Category 2 (96–110 mph, 154–177 km/h) Category 3 (111–129 mph, 178–208 km/h) Category 4 (130–156 mph, 209–251 km/h) Category 5 (≥157 mph, ≥252 km/h) Unknown Storm type Tropical cyclone Subtropical cyclone Extratropical cyclone, remnant low, tropical disturbance, or monsoon depression

Early on August 16 a tropical disturbance developed in the northwestern Pacific Ocean to the northeast of Guam. It was initially forecast that it would not develop into a tropical cyclone by the Joint Typhoon Warning Center, but later that day the JTWC forecast for it to become a tropical cyclone within 24 hours and so issued a Tropical Cyclone Formation Alert. On August 17 the disturbance became more organized and intensified into a tropical depression when it was located to the east of the Philippines. The JTWC designated it as 13W. Later that day both the JMAand PAGASA identified the tropical depression and started to issue full advisories on the depression with PAGASA assigning the name Karen to the depression.

The depression then rapidly intensified into a tropical storm with the JTWCupgrading it that day whilst the JMA and PAGASA did so the day after. When the JMA designated the depression as a tropical storm it was assigned the name Nuri and the international designation of 0810 by the RSMC in Tokyo. This rapid intensification continued with the JMA designating it as a severe tropical storm on August 18; then they, along with JTWC and PAGASA, upgraded it to a typhoon.

Late on August 19 Nuri made its first landfall on the coast of Cagayan Province in northern Luzon. Nuri then entered the Babuyan Channel early the next day and started to move northwestwards towards the southeastern coast of China. On August 21 PAGASA released its final advisory on Typhoon Karen (Nuri) as Nuri moved out of its area of responsibility and moved towards Hong Kong. The JMA then downgraded Nuri to a severe tropical storm with the JTWC also downgrading Nuri to a tropical storm later that day. The JMA did not downgrade Nuri to a tropical storm until the next morning when Nuri had made a rare direct hit on Hong Kong. The JTWC then issued its final advisory on Nuri and the JMA then downgraded Nuri to a weak tropical depression early the next day and issued its last full advisory on Nuri just as it was moving into China.

== Preparations ==
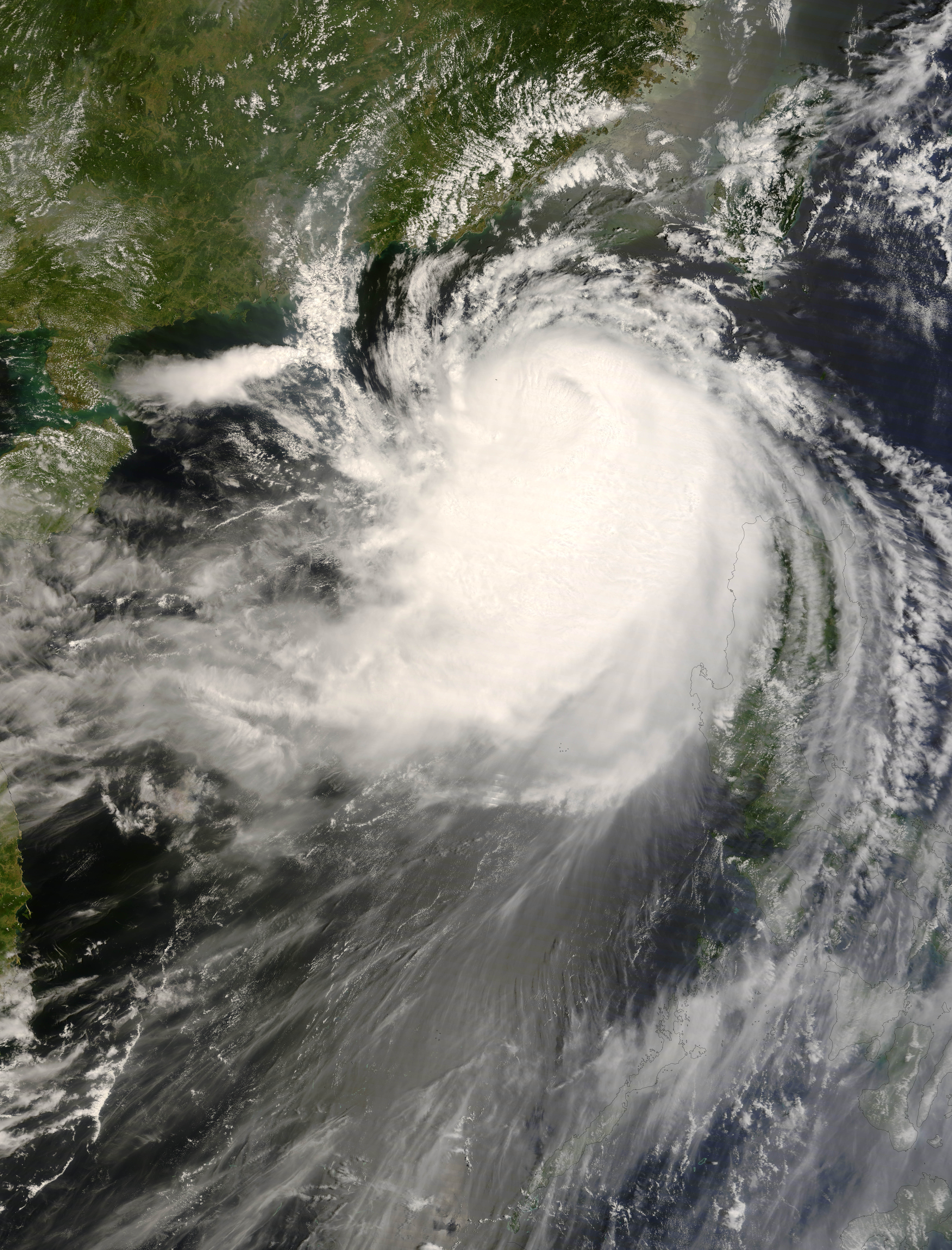
Typhoon Nuri approaching Guangdong on August 21

=== Philippines ===
PAGASA issued Public Storm Warning Signals 1 to 3 all across Northern and Central Luzon. The areas initially issued of Storm Signal number 1 are the Cagayan and Isabela provinces. However, as the storm tracked nearer to Cagayan, more areas were put under storm signals 1, 2 and 3. PAGASA issued warnings on Karen until 21 August.

On August 19 the National Disaster Coordinating Council (NDCC) proclaimed suspension of classes on the 19th and 20 August for the following regions: Central Luzon, Ilocos region and National Capital Region as PAGASA had forecast that these regions would be affected by Typhoon Karen (Nuri).

=== Hong Kong ===
On August 20 as Typhoon Nuri moved away from the Philippines towards southern China, The Hong Kong Observatory (HKO) issued the Standby Signal No. 1 as Typhoon Nuri was centred within 800 kilometres of Hong Kong. Late the next day the HKO issued the Strong Wind Signal No. 3 as Typhoon Nuri had tracked closer towards Hong Kong. On August 22, the HKO issued the Northwest Gale or Storm Signal No. 8 at 07:40 (HKT). Later that day at 13:40 (HKT) the HKO hoisted the Increasing Storm Signal No. 9 at 13:40 (HKT). The HKO then warned that they would be forced to hoist their first Hurricane Signal No. 10 since Typhoon York in 1999 if Nuri maintained its strength.

However, as Nuri had weakened slightly, the HKO did not need to issue their highest wind signal. The HKO kept the Increasing Storm Signal No. 9 stayed in force for 11 hours, which is longer than any other No. 9 signals on record. Before they lowered it to the Southwest Gale or Storm Signal No. 8 on August 23 which was in force for 2 hours before it was downgraded to the Strong Wind Signal No. 3 and was downgraded to the Standby Signal No. 1 signal at 09:40 (HKT). All signals were cancelled at 11.15 am (HKT).

== Impact ==
=== Philippines ===
In the Philippines, Typhoon Karen (Nuri) killed twelve people, wounded thirteen and left seventeen missing. Karen also had adverse effects on 297,823 people in 947 barangays in nine provinces. Damage to property caused by the typhoon in Ilocos, Cagayan and Cordillera regions amounted to more than PHP 518.7 million, of which PHP 136.6 million were damaged infrastructure and PHP 382.1 million were agricultural damages. There was also an old woman in Baguio that has been trapped in the leftover debris of a landslide. The rains the storm brought even forced Malacaňang to suspend classes all over Metro Manila, which were by then left unsuspended despite the heavy rain there that morning. However, overall damage was still felt over northern Luzon, especially in the provinces of Cagayan and Ilocos Norte.

=== Hong Kong ===
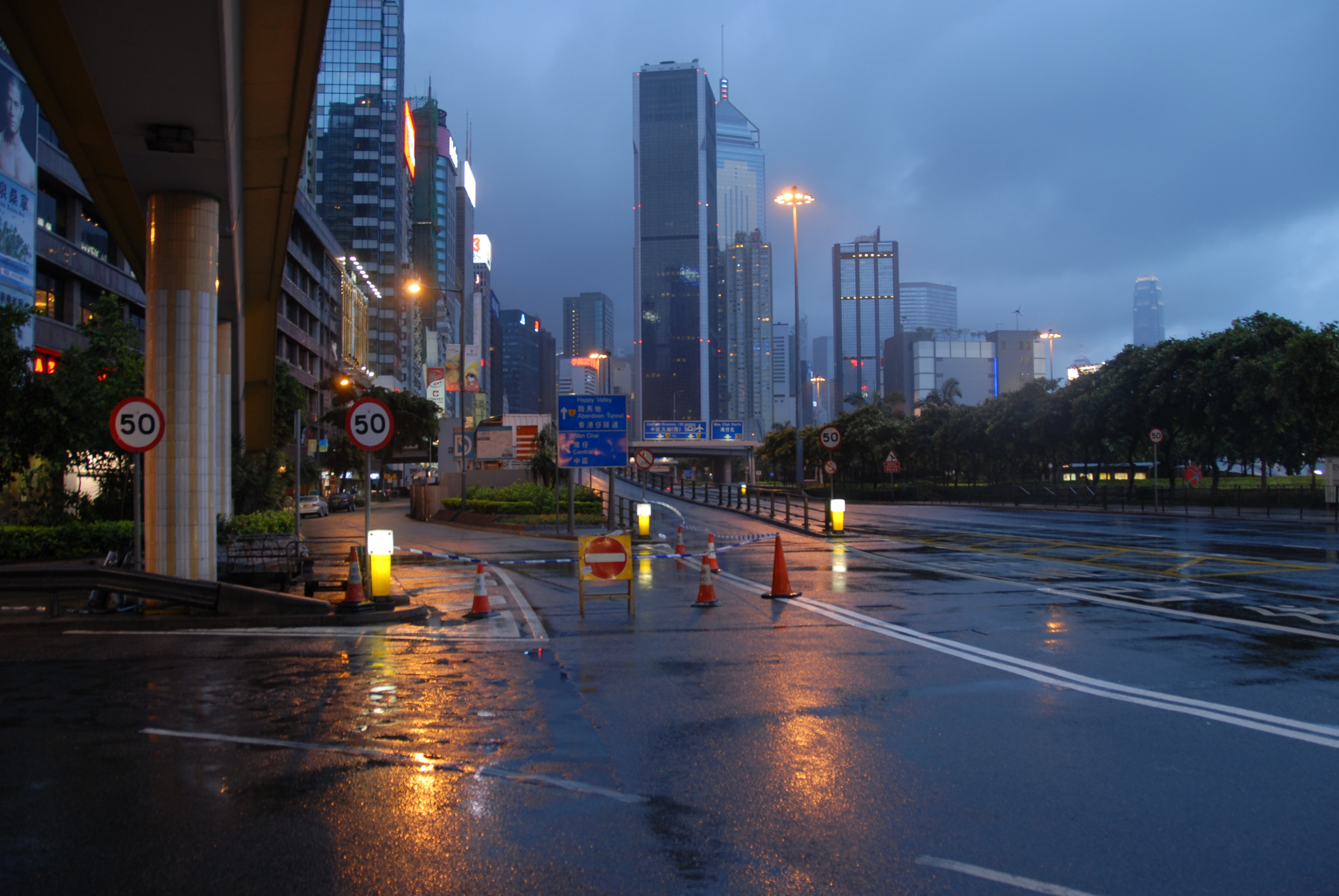
Hong Kong during Nuri's passage

Typhoon Nuri caused about $380 (2008 USD) in damage when it passed through Hong Kong on August 22, 2008. Nuri caused two deaths in Hong Kong as well as injuring 112 people. There were 122 reports of fallen or damaged trees, & two reports of roofs being blown off as well as eight reports of collapsed scaffolding. At the Hong Kong International Airport over 590 flights were diverted to other airports, delayed or canceled.

=== China ===
Within China Typhoon Nuri is reported to have affected more than 900,000 people as well as 53,000 hectares of crops within China's Guangdong Province. Nuri caused $58 Million (2008 USD) damage when it weakened into an area of low pressure over China's Guangdong Province. Nuri also caused four deaths within Guangdong.

== See also ==
- Other tropical cyclones named Nuri
- Other tropical cyclones named Karen
- Typhoon Ellen (1983)
- Typhoon Kai-tak (2012)
- Typhoon Krosa (2013)
- Typhoon Kalmaegi (2014)
- Tropical Storm Nida (2016)
- Typhoon Mangkhut (2018)
- Tropical Storm Kompasu (2021)
- Tropical Storm Ma-on (2022)
- Typhoon Doksuri (2023)
- Typhoon Yinxing (2024)
- Tropical Storm Wipha (2025)
