= Typhoon Lynn =

Pacific typhoon in 1987

Typhoon Lynn (Pepang)
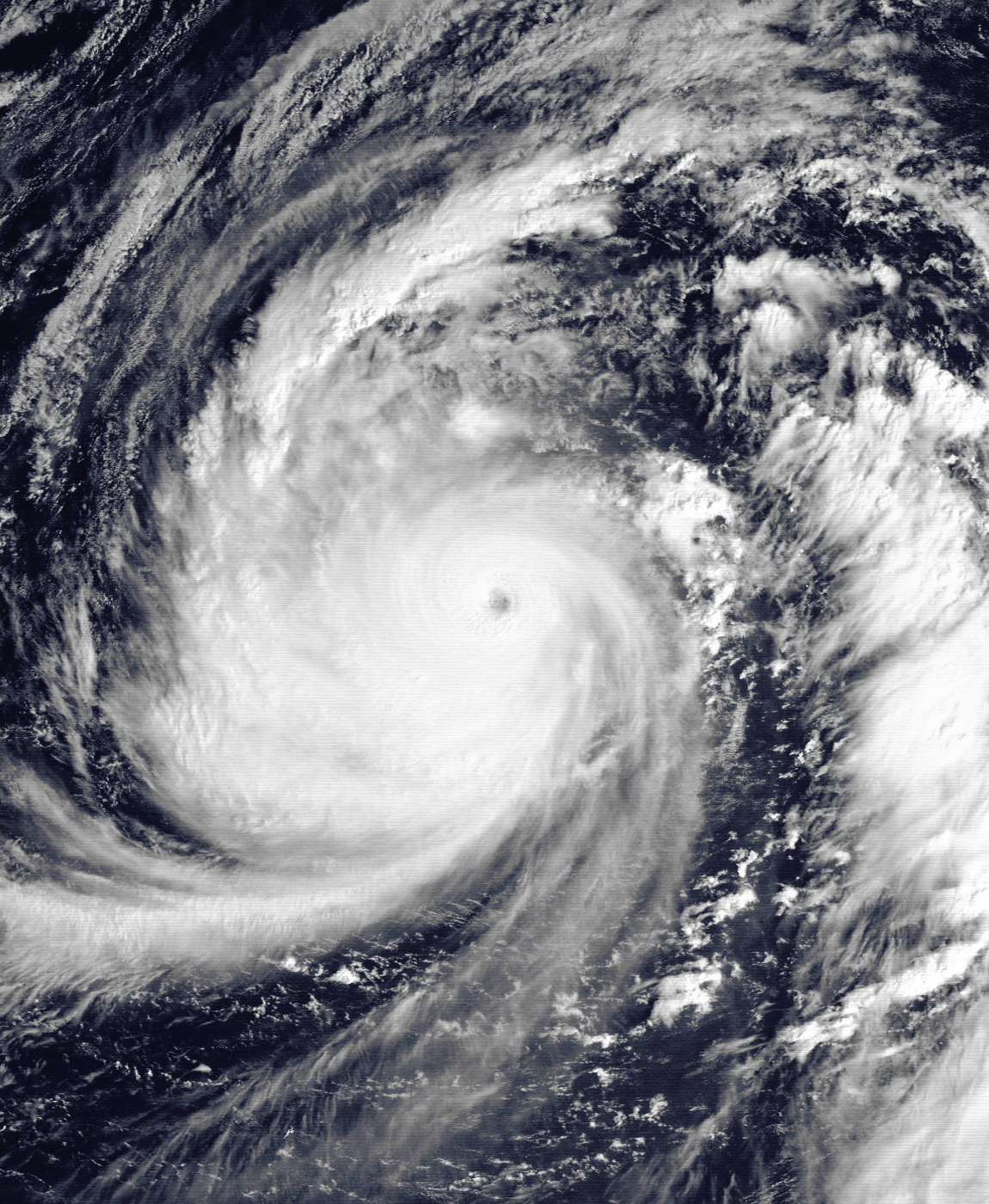
- Typhoon Lynn at peak intensity on October 20

Meteorological history
- Formed: October 14, 1987
- Dissipated: October 28, 1987

Violent typhoon
- 10-minute sustained (JMA)
- Highest winds: 195 km/h (120 mph)
- Lowest pressure: 920 hPa (mbar); 27.17 inHg

Category 5-equivalent super typhoon
- 1-minute sustained (SSHWS/JTWC)
- Highest winds: 260 km/h (160 mph)
- Lowest pressure: 898 hPa (mbar); 26.52 inHg

Overall effects
- Fatalities: 49 total
- Damage: $32.3 million
- Areas affected: Mariana Islands, Philippines, Taiwan, China
- IBTrACS
- Part of the 1987 Pacific typhoon season

Typhoon Lynn, more commonly known in the Philippines as Super Typhoon Pepang, was a typhoon that was responsible for the worst flooding in Taiwan in 40 years. Typhoon Lynn originated from an area of disturbed weather in the central north Pacific in mid-October 1987. On October 15, the system was upgraded into a tropical storm. Moving west-northwest, it slowly deepened over the next few days, though the intensification process briefly stopped on October 15. Two days later, Lynn was upgraded into a typhoon, while passing northwest of Guam. Lynn maintained low-end typhoon strength until October 19, when the storm began to rapidly intensify. On October 21, Lynn attained its peak intensity while tracking towards the west. Weakening then commenced soon after Lynn interacted with Luzon. However, the core of the typhoon remained well offshore both the Philippines and Taiwan. On October 25, Lynn weakened to a severe tropical storm. Three days later, it dissipated, though its remains later brought rain to China.

While passing near Guam, power was knocked out and 40 residents were evacuated. Throughout the Mariana Islands, 15 families were rendered homeless and damage totaled $2 million (1987 USD). After brushing Luzon, seven people perished, over 30,000 homes were damaged, 100 houses were destroyed, and 7,000 individuals were left homeless. Damage in the Philippines totaled to $25.3 million. Even though Lynn passed a bit south of Taiwan, the storm brought widespread damage to the nation. Nine children were swept away and killed on a field trip, while another 72 survived and were evacuated. In Taipei, 13 persons perished and 2,230 people were rescued. Lynn was considered the worst tropical cyclone to affect the city in four decades. Nationwide, 168,000 people lost power and 42 casualties occurred.

== Meteorological history ==
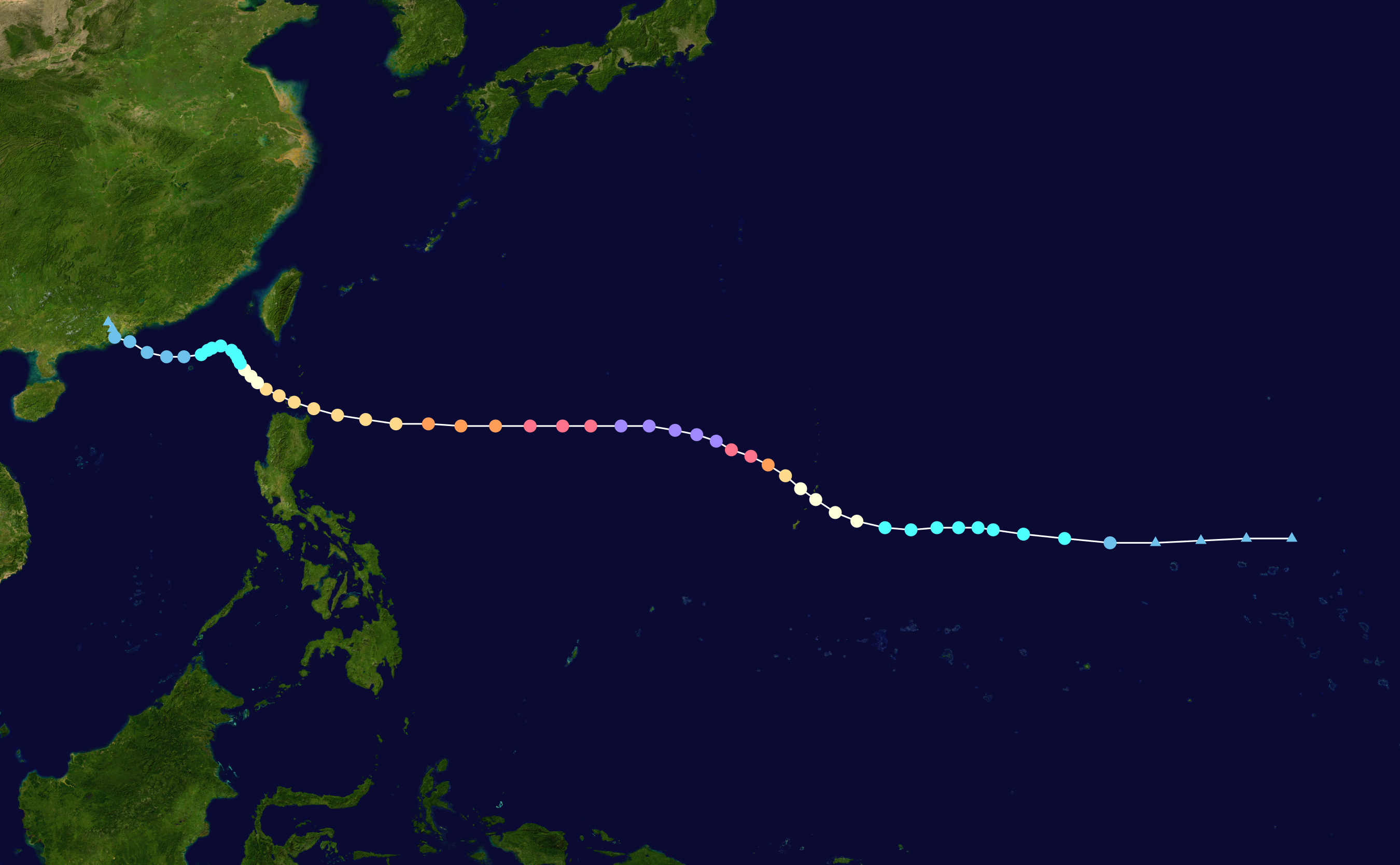
Map plotting the storm's track and intensity, according to the Saffir–Simpson scale Map key Saffir–Simpson scale Tropical depression (≤38 mph, ≤62 km/h) Tropical storm (39–73 mph, 63–118 km/h) Category 1 (74–95 mph, 119–153 km/h) Category 2 (96–110 mph, 154–177 km/h) Category 3 (111–129 mph, 178–208 km/h) Category 4 (130–156 mph, 209–251 km/h) Category 5 (≥157 mph, ≥252 km/h) Unknown Storm type Tropical cyclone Subtropical cyclone Extratropical cyclone, remnant low, tropical disturbance, or monsoon depression

Typhoon Lynn originated from a broad, poorly organized area of convection situated within the monsoon trough roughly 370 km (230 mi) north-northeast of the Marshall Islands in the middle of October 1987. The Joint Typhoon Warning Center (JTWC) started monitoring the system on October 14, and later that day, the Japan Meteorological Agency (JMA) followed suit. (Note: The Japan Meteorological Agency is the official Regional Specialized Meteorological Center for the western Pacific Ocean.) Following an increase in convection and outflow, the JTWC issued a Tropical Cyclone Formation Alert (TCFA) for the system at 0300 UTC on October 15 about 670 km (415 mi) north-northwest of Pohnpei of the eastern Carolina Islands at the time. Three hours later, the JTWC classified the system as Tropical Storm Lynn based on Dvorak estimates of 65 km/h (40 mph). At midday, the JMA followed suit and upgraded the system into a tropical storm.

Tracking along the southern periphery of a subtropical ridge, the cyclone decelerated. Lynn gradually intensified, though this process briefly halted on October 17. (Note: Wind estimates from the JMA and most other basins throughout the world are sustained over 10 minutes, while estimates from the United States-based Joint Typhoon Warning Center are sustained over 1 minute. 10 minute winds are about 1.14 times the amount of 1 minute winds.) Early the next day, the JMA reported that Lynn had deepened into a severe tropical storm. Shortly thereafter, radar data and satellite imagery revealed the formation of an eye 37 km (23 mi) in diameter, and thus the JTWC upgraded Lynn into a typhoon, though post-storm analysis noted that Lynn could have been a typhoon before then. Also around this time, the JMA designated Lynn as a typhoon. At midday, Lynn made its closest approach to Guam, passing around 150 km (95 mi) northeast of the island. Three hours later, Lynn passed 28 km (17 mi) southwest of Tinian before proceeding west-northwest.

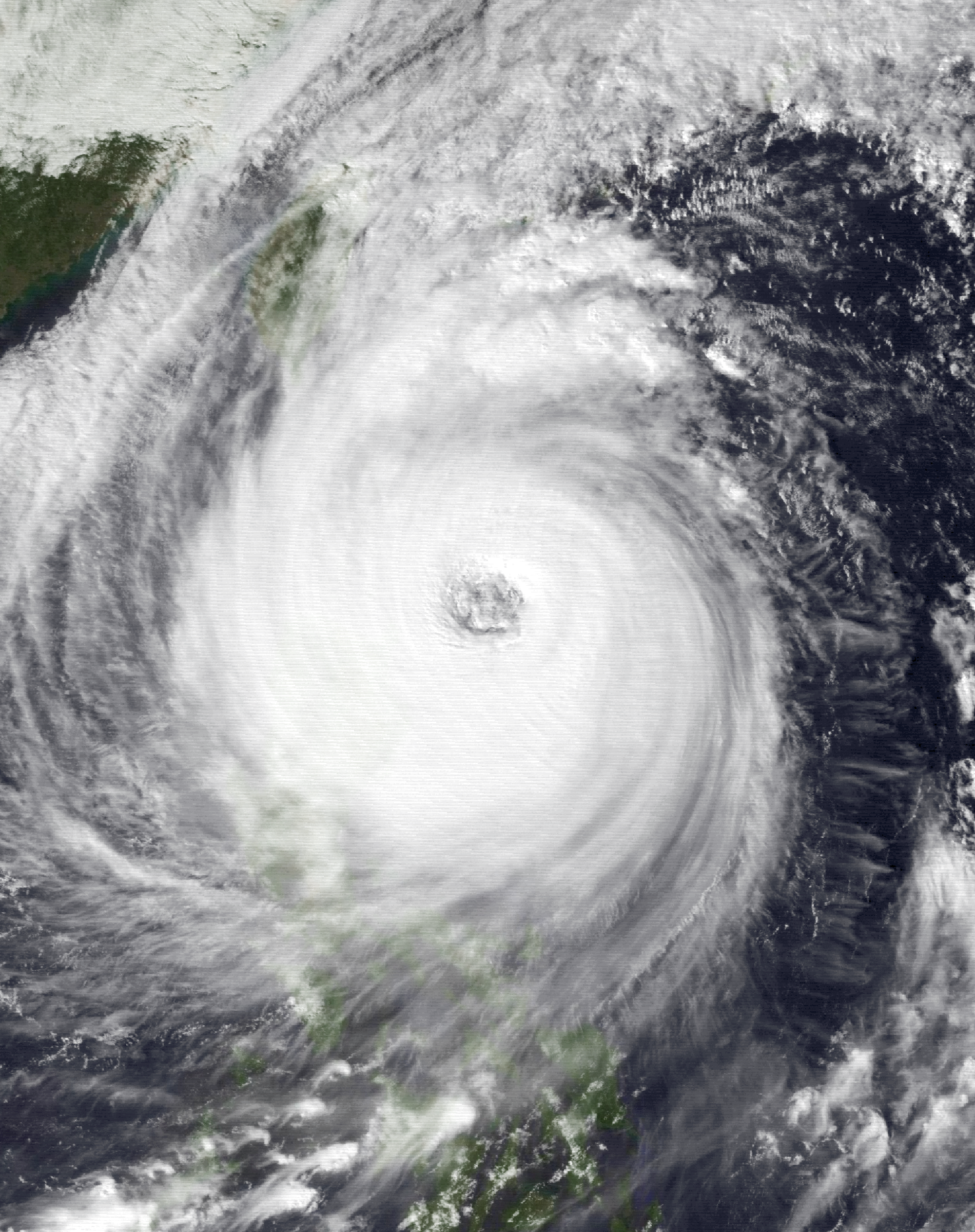
Lynn near the Philippines on October 23

After moving away from the Mariana Islands, Lynn initially maintained its intensity, but on August 19, it began to rapidly intensify. Later that day, the JTWC upgraded Lynn to a super typhoon and early on August 20, Typhoon Lynn attained winds of 185 km/h (115 mph) according to the JMA. After leveling off in intensity for roughly 24 hours, the JMA estimates that Lynn reached its peak intensity of 195 km/h (120 mph) and a minimum barometric pressure of 920 mbar (27 inHg). At 0000 UTC on August 21, the JTWC indicated that Lynn reached its peak intensity of 255 km/h (160 mph), equivalent to a Category 5 hurricane on the Saffir-Simpson hurricane wind scale. According to the JTWC, Typhoon Lynn was the third typhoon in 1987 to attain such intensity. Meanwhile, the Philippine Atmospheric, Geophysical and Astronomical Services Administration (PAGASA) also monitored the storm and assigned it with the local name Pepang.

Shortly after attaining maximum intensity, Lynn began to track westward while steadily weakening. Initially, the JTWC predicted Lynn to take a more west-northwesterly course, but the European Center for Medium-Range Weather Forecasting (ECMWF) correctly predicted Lynn to move due west due to a subtropical ridge situated north of the cyclone. On October 22, the JMA indicated that Lynn leveled off in intensity, though at 0000 UTC on October 23, the cyclone deteriorated slightly. Roughly 24 hours later, the JMA reduced the intensity of Lynn to 145 km/h (90 mph); by this time, the typhoon entered the Luzon Straits. Over the next two days, Lynn interacted with mountainous terrain of the Philippines; however, at its closest approach, the core of the system remained over 200 km (120 mi) offshore. Meanwhile, the weakening process accelerated, and on October 25, the JMA reported that Lynn was no longer a typhoon. Furthermore, the storm exited PAGASA's warning zone. Increased wind shear took toll on Lynn, and the next day, satellite imagery indicated that all of the storm's deep convection was confined north-northeast of the center. At 0000 UTC on October 27, the JTWC ceased watching the system, though the JMA continued tracking it until the morning of August 28. The remnants of the storm later brought showers to China.

== Impact ==
Wettest tropical cyclones and their remnants in Taiwan Highest-known totals
Precipitation			Storm	Location	Ref.
Rank	mm	in	Storm	Location	Ref.
1	3,060	120.47	Morakot 2009	Alishan, Chiayi	
2	2,319	91.30	Nari 2001	Wulai, New Taipei	
3	2,162	85.12	Flossie 1969	Beitou, Taipei	
4	1,987	78.23	Herb 1996	Alishan, Chiayi	
5	1,933	76.10	Gaemi 2024	Maolin, Kaoshiung	
6	1,774	69.84	Saola 2012	Yilan City	
7	1,725	67.91	Krathon 2024	Beinan, Taitung	
8	1,700	66.93	Lynn 1987	Taipei	
9	1,672	65.83	Clara 1967	Dongshan, Yilan	
10	1,611	63.43	Sinlaku 2008	Heping, Taichung	

=== Mariana Islands ===
Although the eye of Lynn passed just offshore Guam, it brought violent conditions to the island. There, a maximum sustained wind speed of 67 km/h (42 mph) and a peak wind gust of 105 km/h (65 mph) was recorded in Agana. Moreover, 154.4 mm (6.08 in) of rain fell at a nearby air force base. Power was briefly knocked out for the entire island, though by October 20, electricity had been restored to most of the island. Around 40 residents were evacuated to shelter along low-lying areas. Several homes sustained serious damages while many others suffered roof damage. The banana and papaya crops were largely destroyed by the typhoon, but damage to other crops was minimal. No one in Guam was injured by Lynn.

After passing near Saipan, winds of 80 km/h (50 mph) and gusts of 121 km/h (75 mph) were observed. All commercial flights to and from the island, as well as all schools and government offices, were cancelled on both October 19 and 20. Both Saipan and Rota experienced island-wide power outages on the evening of October 18. Saipan bore the most significant effects from the cyclone; four people were hurt and two homes were destroyed. Several homes and office buildings on the island were also damaged. Elsewhere, around 10 families fled to shelter as a result of strong winds. Although damage in Rota was minor, the island of Tinian received considerable damage and all of the island's 2,000 residents were briefly left without electricity. Heavy rains resulted in flooding that destroyed several dwellings and deluged many more.

Throughout the Mariana Islands, agriculture damage was estimated at $2 million (1987 USD) and 15 families were displaced from their homes. Roughly 100 people sought help from the Red Cross. A few weeks later, the Northern Marianas Islands were declared a major disaster area by the Federal Emergency Management Agency (FEMA).

=== Philippines ===
On October 23, most of Luzon was placed under weather alerts. Due to the threat of both storm surge and high waves, low-lying residents were advised to evacuate their homes. A total of five towns were flooded in Cagayan and Ilocos Norte provinces, while Lynn triggered landslides in Benguet. In the mountain resort of Baguio City, communication and power lines sustained damage and many roads outside of Manila were destroyed; over 200 homes were damaged and 100 others were demolished. Nationwide, 79 people were hurt and 31,557 homes were partially damaged, while 18,396 were "totally" damaged. Furthermore, around 6,000 were rendered homeless and seven fatalities occurred. Damage totaled $25.3 million, mostly due to public infrastructure and agriculture. (Note: All Philippine currencies are converted to United States Dollars using Philippines Measuring worth with an exchange rate of the year 1987.)

=== Taiwan ===
In preparation for Lynn, typhoon warnings were issued. Despite not striking the country directly, Typhoon Lynn brought torrential rains to much of the island from October 24–26, including a maximum of 1,700 mm (67 in) in Taipei. Two fourth graders and seven third graders were swept out to sea due to 20 ft (6.1 m) waves while on a field trip in Maopitou, a scenic spot in Kenting National Park. However, on October 24, the bodies of two girls and a boy were found near Hengchun while the remaining were presumed dead. The other 72 students on the trip were safely evacuated. Elsewhere, a 31-year-old man was killed due to falling debris in Hualien. Two people were killed and four others were buried in Keelung, where several cargo containers were swept offshore. Damage in Keelung totaled $5 million. In Pingtung, 30,000 houses were flooded. Across northern Taiwan, nine people were killed. In Taipei, torrential rains deluged the city and resulted in landslides that destroyed numerous dwellings and took 13 lives. Citywide, 2,230 people were rescued by police, while after supply in the capital was cut by 75%. In all, Lynn was considered the worst system to affect Taipei in 40 years.

Throughout the island, domestic flights and train service was cancelled. At the northern port of Ilan, about 60 fishing boats were lost. Three fishermen were rescued after their boat capsized. A total of 168,000 people lost power at some point during the storm's passage, though by October 27 power was restored to all but 88,000. Overall, 42 people were killed nationwide.

== See also ==
- List of wettest tropical cyclones
- Typhoon Zeb
- Typhoon Ruby (1988)
- Typhoon Yutu
