= Typhoon Saola (2012) =

Pacific typhoon in 2012

Typhoon Saola (Gener)
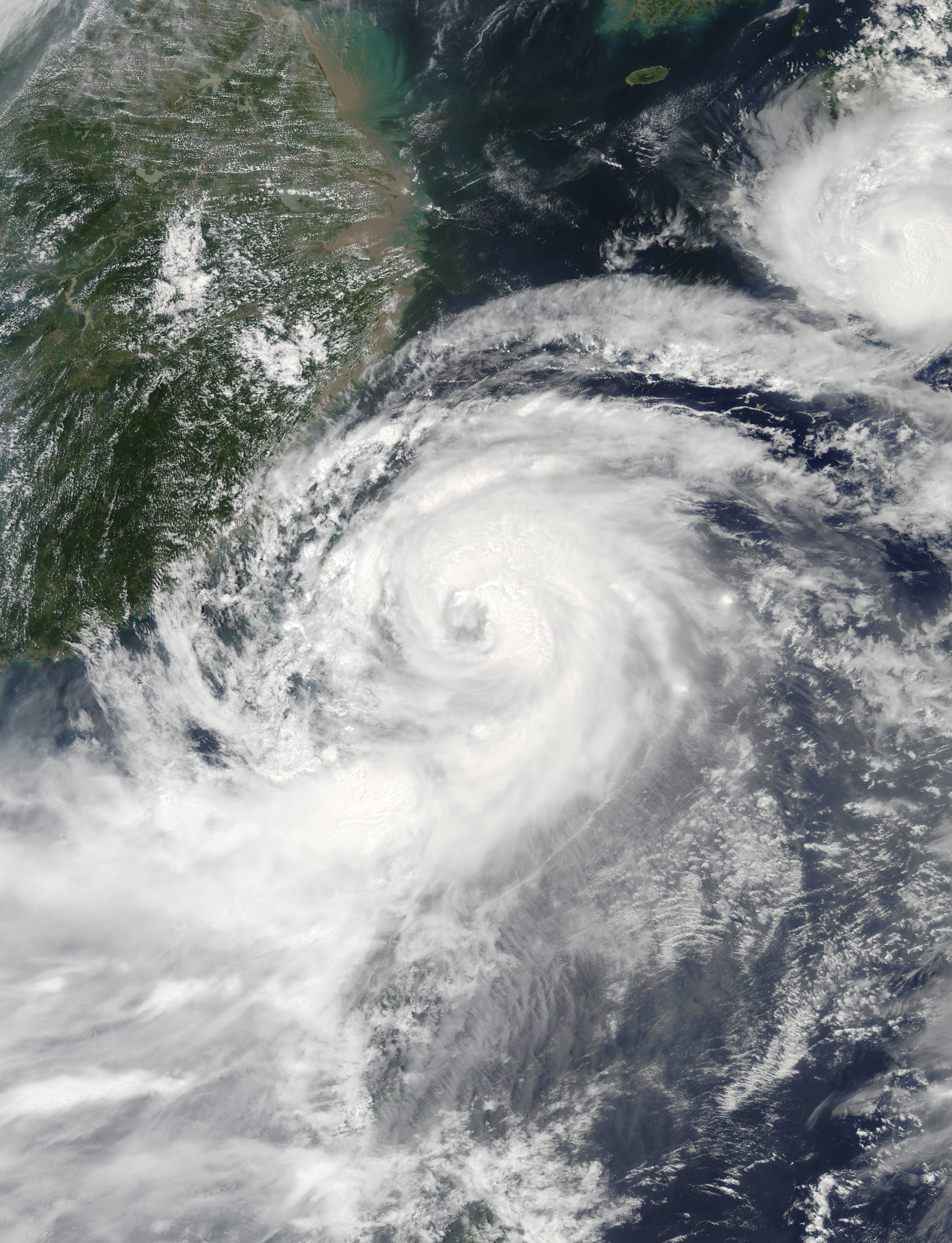
- Typhoon Saola at peak intensity on August 1 with Typhoon Damrey to the north

Meteorological history
- Formed: July 26, 2012
- Dissipated: August 5, 2012

Typhoon
- 10-minute sustained (JMA)
- Highest winds: 130 km/h (80 mph)
- Lowest pressure: 960 hPa (mbar); 28.35 inHg

Category 2-equivalent typhoon
- 1-minute sustained (SSHWS/JTWC)
- Highest winds: 165 km/h (105 mph)
- Lowest pressure: 956 hPa (mbar); 28.23 inHg

Overall effects
- Fatalities: 85 total
- Damage: $2.73 billion (2012 USD)
- Areas affected: Philippines, Taiwan, Ryukyu Islands, China
- IBTrACS
- Part of the 2012 Pacific typhoon season

Typhoon Saola, (Note: The name Saola (Vietnamese: sao la, [saːw˧˧ laː˧˧]) was contributed by Vietnam and refers to the saola (Pseudoryx nghetinhensis) in Vietnamese.) known in the Philippines as Typhoon Gener, was a strong tropical cyclone affecting the Philippines, Taiwan and China in late-July 2012. It was the ninth named storm and the fourth typhoon of the 2012 Pacific typhoon season.

== Meteorological history ==
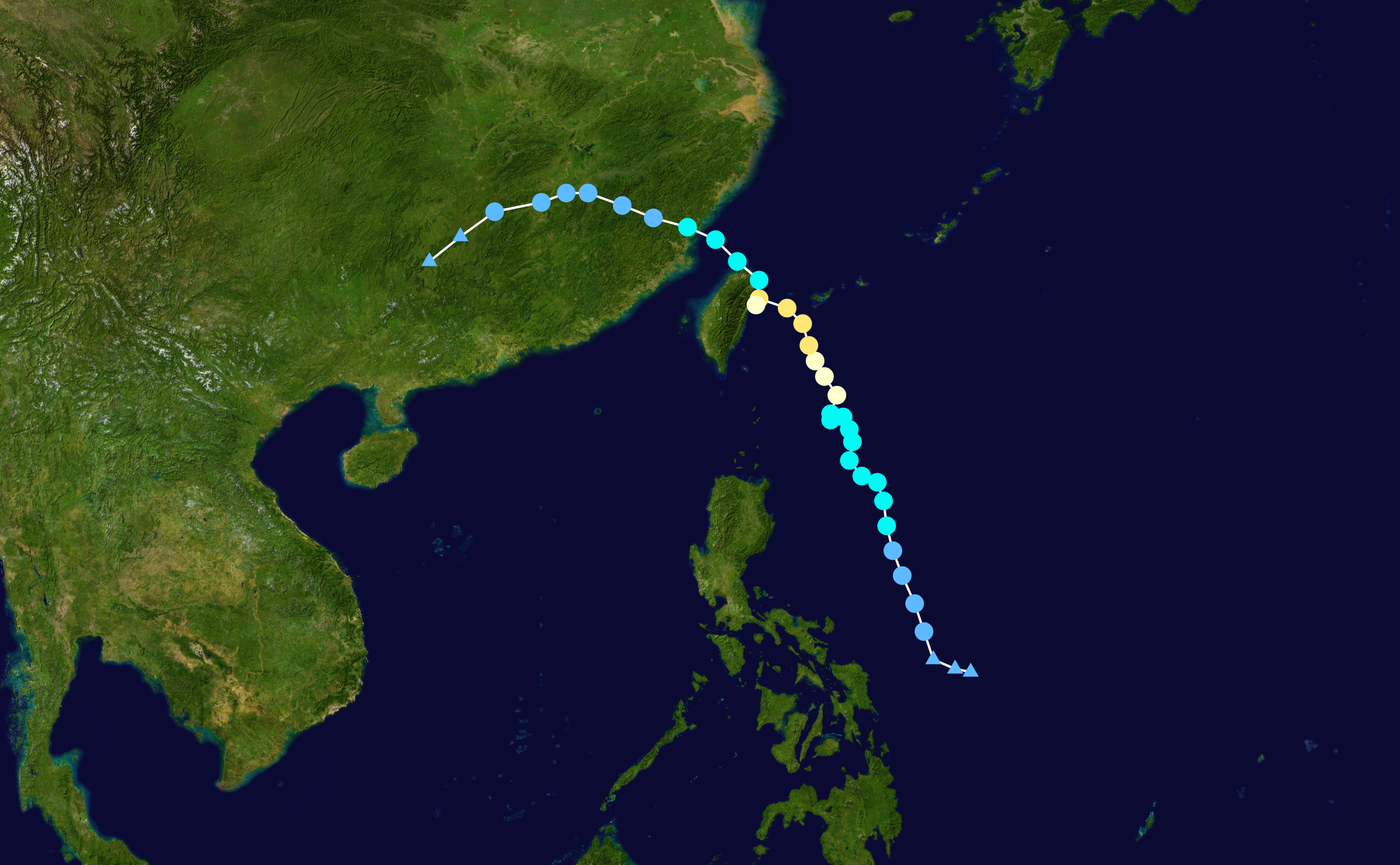
Map plotting the storm's track and intensity, according to the Saffir–Simpson scale Map key Saffir–Simpson scale Tropical depression (≤38 mph, ≤62 km/h) Tropical storm (39–73 mph, 63–118 km/h) Category 1 (74–95 mph, 119–153 km/h) Category 2 (96–110 mph, 154–177 km/h) Category 3 (111–129 mph, 178–208 km/h) Category 4 (130–156 mph, 209–251 km/h) Category 5 (≥157 mph, ≥252 km/h) Unknown Storm type Tropical cyclone Subtropical cyclone Extratropical cyclone, remnant low, tropical disturbance, or monsoon depression

On July 26, the Japan Meteorological Agency (JMA) reported that a tropical depression had developed within an area of strong vertical windshear in the monsoon trough about 1,000 kilometres (620 mi) to the southeast of Manila in the Philippines. During that day the shear relaxed before during the next day, the Joint Typhoon Warning Center (JTWC) issued a Tropical Cyclone Formation Alert on the system.

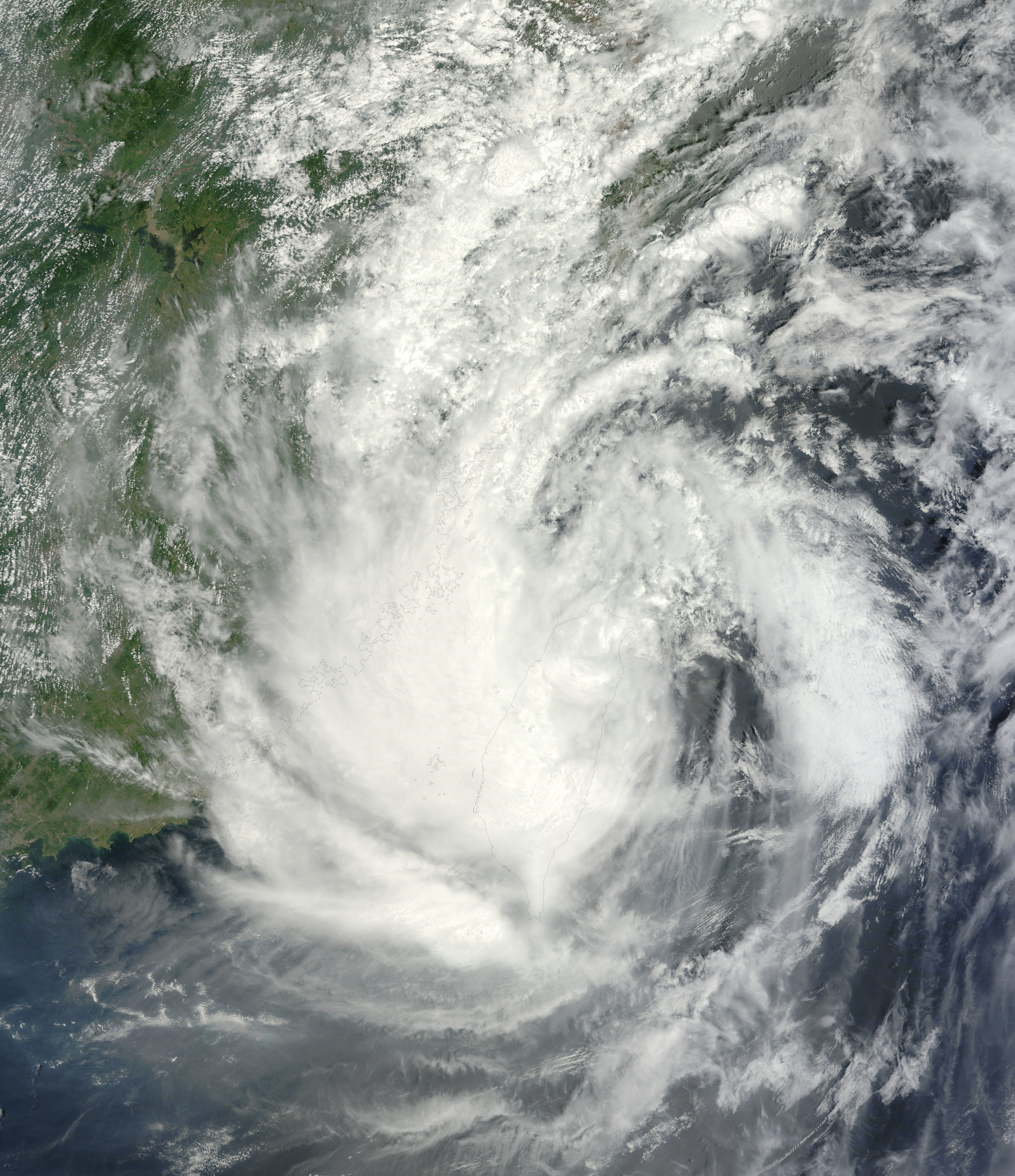
Severe Tropical Storm Saola over Taiwan

Early on July 28, the JTWC upgraded the system to a tropical depression, whilst the JMA upgraded it to a tropical storm and named it Saola. Soon, the Philippine Atmospheric, Geophysical and Astronomical Services Administration (PAGASA) upgraded the system to a tropical depression and named it Gener. Later that day, the JTWC upgraded Saola to a tropical storm. Early on July 29, the JMA upgraded Saola to a severe tropical storm. On July 30, the JTWC upgraded Saola to a category 1 typhoon, as it started to develop an eye-like feature, but soon downgraded it to a tropical storm late on the same day. On July 31, the JTWC upgraded Saola to a category 1 typhoon again. Late on the same day, the JMA upgraded Saola to a typhoon, and the JTWC soon upgraded it to a category 2 typhoon early on the next day. The Central Weather Bureau (CWB) reported that Typhoon Saola made landfall over Xiulin, Hualien in Taiwan at 19:20 UTC on August 1 (03:20 TST on August 2). However, Saola later moved counterclockwise and arrived the ocean soon, whilst the JMA downgraded it to a severe tropical storm early on August 2 due to strong land interaction. At 06Z on the same day, Saola passed over Cape San Diego, the easternmost point of Taiwan. Late on August 2, the JMA downgraded Saola to a tropical storm, before it made landfall over Fuding in Fujian, China at 22:50 UTC (06:50 CST on August 3). On August 3, the JMA downgraded Saola to a tropical depression, after the JTWC issued a final warning on the system. The system continued to weaken into a weak low pressure area over Jiangxi, China on August 4. The weak, remnant low later drifted south west to the Gulf of Tokin, and regenerated slightly on August 7.

== Preparations and impact ==
=== Philippines ===
Wettest tropical cyclones and their remnants in Taiwan Highest-known totals
Precipitation			Storm	Location	Ref.
Rank	mm	in	Storm	Location	Ref.
1	3,060	120.47	Morakot 2009	Alishan, Chiayi	
2	2,319	91.30	Nari 2001	Wulai, New Taipei	
3	2,162	85.12	Flossie 1969	Beitou, Taipei	
4	1,987	78.23	Herb 1996	Alishan, Chiayi	
5	1,933	76.10	Gaemi 2024	Maolin, Kaoshiung	
6	1,774	69.84	Saola 2012	Yilan City	
7	1,725	67.91	Krathon 2024	Beinan, Taitung	
8	1,700	66.93	Lynn 1987	Taipei	
9	1,672	65.83	Clara 1967	Dongshan, Yilan	
10	1,611	63.43	Sinlaku 2008	Heping, Taichung	

Saola caused widespread rains in the Philippines due to the enhancement of the southwest monsoon. On July 29, domestic and international flights throughout the country were delayed and cancelled. Small fishing crafts were advised to not engage in the water as a gale warning was issued by PAGASA. The NDRRMC alerted their agency as the storm is expected to bring heavy rains. Seaports were also advised to cancel their trips. Flooding is imminent as different dams are expected to reach its critical level and possibly release huge millimeters of water. About three roads in northern Luzon were impassable due to floods and landslides. About sixty families in Rodriguez, Rizal were evacuated due to severe flooding in the area. Early on July 30, classes were suspended from pre-school to tertiary level as strong winds and severe rainfall were recorded throughout Metro Manila and nearby provinces.

In all, 54 fatalities were confirmed in the Philippines, with three others went missing and 35 people were injured. Almost 950,000 people were affected by Saola. More than 9,300 houses were damages. Damage from the storm amounted to ₱728 million (US$17.3 million), more than half of them was due to agricultural losses.

=== Taiwan ===
As the storm made landfall in Taiwan, almost the entire island suspended services as high winds and rains triggered flooding in several locations. Almost 70 inches fell in some areas, ranking Saola within the top 5 wettest cyclones to ever hit the island. Authorities ordered schools and business to shut, with the exception of few major factories. Financial markets were also closed, and would remain until 3 August. Taiwanese Army soldiers rescued more than 1,000 people from remote mountainous villages in the north and east. Two passenger boarding bridges collapsed at Taoyuan International Airport, which serves Taipei, slightly damaging a China Airlines aircraft and forcing the company to scrap the flight. More than 200 international and domestic flight were reportedly cancelled because of the storm.

At least six people were killed and two were missing in Taiwan as of 2 August, in addition to 16 injured. Agricultural losses across the island reached NT$1.02 billion (US$34 million).

=== China ===
In Fujian Province, a total of 9,708 homes were destroyed and 36,726 more were damaged. Preliminary damage was estimated at ¥1.02 billion (US$160 million). In Hubei Province, over 135,000 people were displaced by the floods and left in need of assistance across the province. In total, 25 people were killed in China, and total economic losses were counted to be CNY17.15 billion (US$2.68 billion).

== See also ==
- List of wettest tropical cyclones
- Typhoon Gaemi (2024)
- Typhoon Nesat (2017)
- Typhoon Matmo (2014)
- Typhoon Fitow (2013)
- Typhoon Jangmi (2008)
- Typhoon Morakot
