= List of storms named Jangmi =

The name Jangmi (Korean: 장미, [t͡ɕa̠ŋmi]) has been used for five tropical cyclones in the western North Pacific Ocean. The variant Changmi was used in 2002 before the spelling was corrected by the ESCAP/WMO Typhoon Committee. The name was contributed by South Korea and means rose in Korean.

- Tropical Storm Changmi (2002) (T0219) – was not recognized by the JTWC.
- Typhoon Jangmi (2008) (T0815, 19W, Ofel) – made landfall in Nan'ao, Yilan, Taiwan; strongest storm of the annual season.
- Tropical Storm Jangmi (2014) (T1423, 23W, Seniang) – a deadly late-season storm that struck the Philippines.
- Tropical Storm Jangmi (2020) (T2005, 05W, Enteng) – affected South Korea.
- Severe Tropical Storm Jangmi (2026) (T2606, 06W, Domeng) – a strong severe tropical storm that affected Japan.

Preceded by Hagupit	Pacific typhoon season names Jangmi	Succeeded by Mekkhala
