= Typhoon Sinlaku (2008) =

2008 typhoon

Typhoon Sinlaku (Marce)
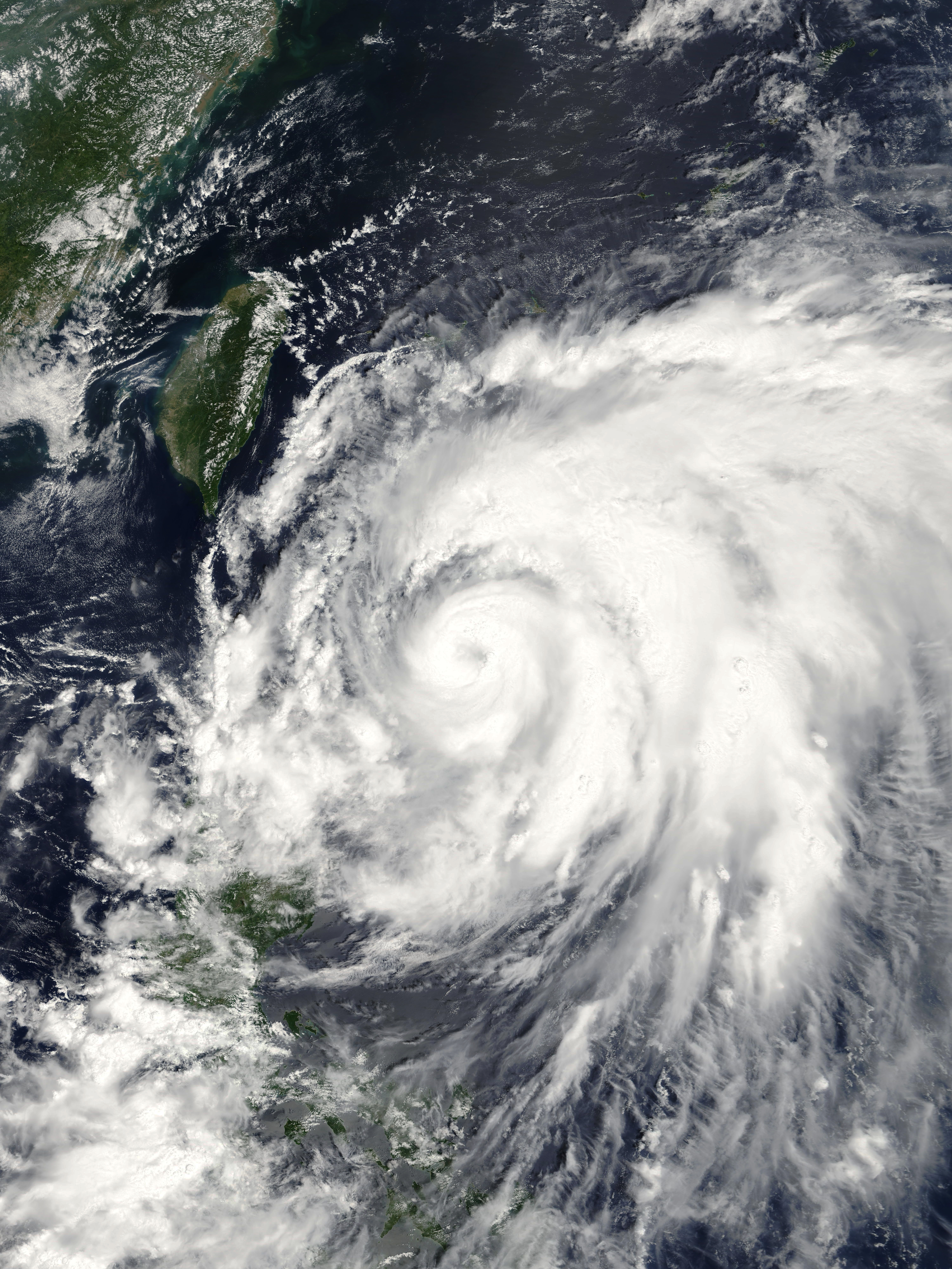
- Typhoon Sinlaku near peak strength on September 10

Meteorological history
- Formed: September 8, 2008
- Extratropical: September 21, 2008
- Dissipated: September 25, 2008

Very strong typhoon
- 10-minute sustained (JMA)
- Highest winds: 185 km/h (115 mph)
- Lowest pressure: 935 hPa (mbar); 27.61 inHg

Category 4-equivalent typhoon
- 1-minute sustained (SSHWS/JTWC)
- Highest winds: 230 km/h (145 mph)
- Lowest pressure: 929 hPa (mbar); 27.43 inHg

Overall effects
- Fatalities: 14
- Missing: 10
- Damage: $1.1 billion (2008 USD)
- Areas affected: Philippines, Taiwan, China, Japan
- IBTrACS
- Part of the 2008 Pacific typhoon season

Typhoon Sinlaku, (Note: The name Sinlaku (Kosraean: Sinlackuh, [sinlɛkʌ]) was contributed by the Federated States of Micronesia and refers to the goddess of nature and breadfruit of Kosrae.) known in the Philippines as Typhoon Marce, was a typhoon which affected the Philippines, Taiwan, China and Japan in mid September 2008. It was recognised as the 13th named storm and the ninth typhoon of the 2008 Pacific typhoon season by the Japan Meteorological Agency.

== Meteorological history ==
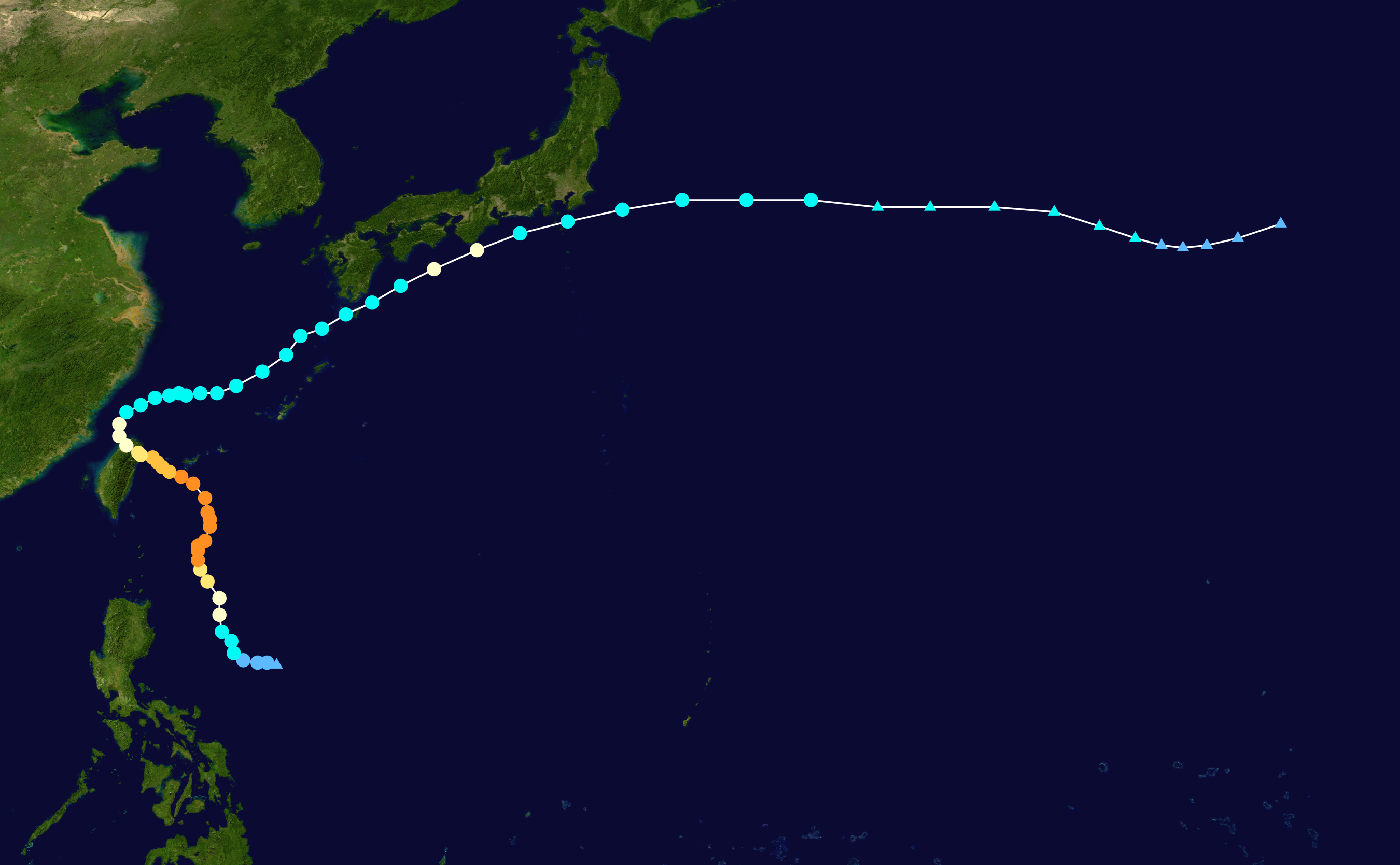
Map plotting the storm's track and intensity, according to the Saffir–Simpson scale Map key Saffir–Simpson scale Tropical depression (≤38 mph, ≤62 km/h) Tropical storm (39–73 mph, 63–118 km/h) Category 1 (74–95 mph, 119–153 km/h) Category 2 (96–110 mph, 154–177 km/h) Category 3 (111–129 mph, 178–208 km/h) Category 4 (130–156 mph, 209–251 km/h) Category 5 (≥157 mph, ≥252 km/h) Unknown Storm type Tropical cyclone Subtropical cyclone Extratropical cyclone, remnant low, tropical disturbance, or monsoon depression

On September 7, 2008, a tropical disturbance formed to the northeast of Manila in the Philippines. It was initially forecasted not to intensify into a tropical depression within 24 hours. However it was upgraded to a tropical depression early the next morning with both PAGASA & the JMA designating it as a minor tropical depression with PAGASA naming the depression as Marce. Meanwhile, the Joint Typhoon Warning Center (JTWC) issued a Tropical Cyclone Formation Alert on the developing depression. Later that day PAGASA upgraded the depression to a tropical storm whilst the JMA started to issue full advisories on the depression. That afternoon the JTWC designated the depression as Tropical Depression 15W. During that evening the depression had intensified into a tropical storm and was named Sinlaku by the JMA. The JTWC also upgraded the depression to a tropical storm that evening.

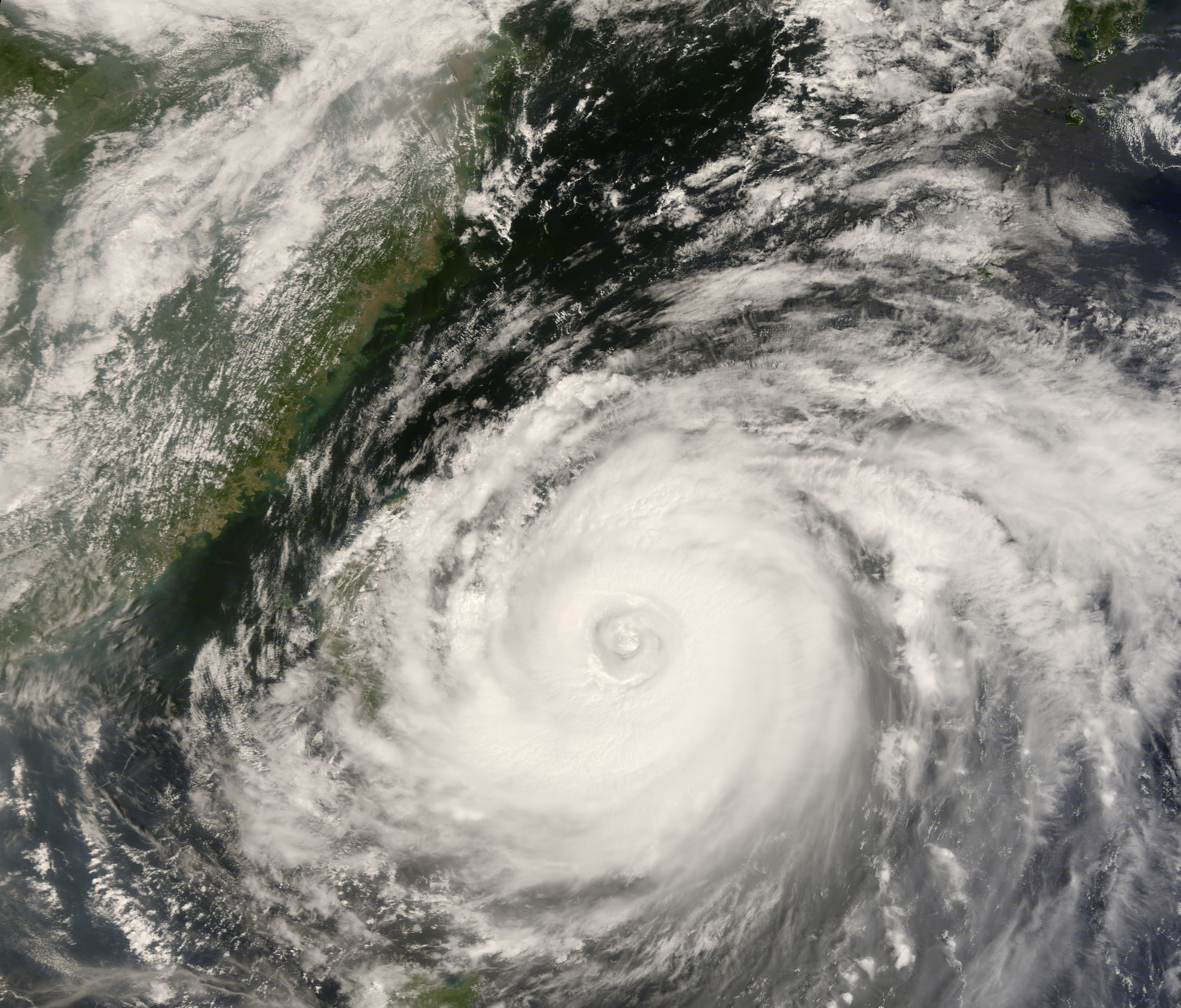
Typhoon Sinlaku approaching Taiwan on September 12

Early on September 9 the JMA upgraded Sinlaku to a Severe Tropical Storm. Whilst during that afternoon the JTWC reported that Sinlaku had intensified into a Typhoon, the JMA then upgraded Sinlaku to a typhoon later that day. The JTWC then reported Sinlaku had intensified into a category two typhoon. During the next day Sinlaku continued to intensify and reached its maximum 1 minute sustained winds of 125 knots which made it a Category 4 typhoon. It stayed at this intensity until the next day when it started to weaken as it went through an eye wall replacement cycle. Sinlaku then struggled to come out of its eye wall replacement cycle and as a result weakened into a Category 3 typhoon. The weakening trend continued until on September 13 Typhoon Sinlaku made landfall on Taiwan as a Category 2 typhoon. It moved towards the North West through Taiwan and then turned towards the north east and moved back into the South China Sea and started moving slowly towards Japan.

Early on September 14, the JMA downgraded Sinlaku to a severe tropical storm. Meanwhile, the JTWC were reporting that Sinlaku was a weak Category 1 typhoon. Later that day PAGASA issued their final advisory on Sinlaku as Sinlaku moved out of its area of responsibility. Late the next day the JTWC downgraded Sinlaku to a Tropical storm and then early on September 16 the JMA then downgraded Sinlaku into a tropical storm whilst Sinlaku moved closer to Japan. On September 17 Sinlaku strengthened into a severe tropical storm whilst the JTWC reported that Sinlaku had regained Typhoon strength, However, later that day the JTWC downgraded Sinlaku to a Tropical storm again. However early the next day the JTWC reported that Sinlaku had once again regained Typhoon intensity however the JTWC downgraded Sinlaku to a tropical storm. Early on September 20, the JTWC issued its final advisory on Tropical Storm 15W as the storm became extratropical. Later that day the JMA, downgraded Sinlaku to a tropical storm. Early on September 21 the JMA downgraded Sinlaku to an extra tropical low as it moved further away from Japan.

== Preparations ==
=== Philippines ===
PAGASA's Public Storm Warnings
Signals No.1 & 2	Signal No.1
Babuyan	Polillo Island
Batanes islands	CAR
Cagayan	Cagayan Valley
Isabela	Aurora

On September 8 PAGASA started to issue Public Storm warnings on Typhoon Marce (Sinlaku). Pagasa immediately hoisted Public Storm warning 1 over parts of Luzon including the Bicol, Isabela, Aurora & Cagayan Regions. Later that day PAGASA hoisted further Signal one's for other parts of Luzon and raised the Public storm warning from No.1 to No.2 for Cagayan & Isabela Early the next day PAGASA downgraded Signal No.2 to No.1 for Isabela & hoisted Signal No.2 for Babuyan as well as downgrading some of the No.1 signals for other parts of Luzon Later that day PAGASA downgraded the signal from No.2 to No.1 for Cagayan and further downgraded some of the other signals. They then kept these signals in place until late on September 10 when they downgraded the signal for Babuyan Island. Late the next day they downgraded all of the signals except for Batanes Island which remained under Signal No.1, until early the next day when PAGASA removed the signal.

=== Taiwan ===
On September 10 the Central Weather Bureau (CWB) issued warnings for heavy rain in north Taiwan. then on September 11 the CWB decided to issue sea warnings which meant that ships that were sailing within the Bashi Channel had to take extra precautions. Land Warnings were then issued the next morning as Sinlaku moved closer to Taiwan.

=== Japan ===
On September 9 the JMA started to issue Storm warnings for Naha on Okinawa and the seas south of Okinawa. Later that day the JMA upgraded the storm warnings to Typhoon warnings whilst Sinlaku moved further north During the next day the Joint Typhoon Warning Center raised the Tropical Cyclone Condition of Readiness (TCCOR) from TCCOR 4 to TCCOR 3 for Okinawa which meant that wind speeds greater than 50 knots were possible within 48 hours. The JMA kept these issuing the typhoon warnings until September 14 when they downgraded it to a Storm warning The JTWC kept the TCCOR in force until September 15 when they lowered TCCOR 3 to TCCOR 4 which meant that wind speeds greater than 50 knots were possible within 72 hours. the JMA also upgraded their storm warnings to typhoon warnings however these typhoon warnings were downgraded to storm warnings later that day Late on September 17 as Sinlaku moved closer to Japan the JMA added the Moji & Yokohama areas to the warnings Early on September 19 the JMA added Otaru and Kushiro to the storm warnings Later that day the JMA revised their storm warnings by removing the warnings for Kushiro, Moji, Naha & Otaru.

== Impact ==
Wettest tropical cyclones and their remnants in Taiwan Highest-known totals
Precipitation			Storm	Location	Ref.
Rank	mm	in	Storm	Location	Ref.
1	3,060	120.47	Morakot 2009	Alishan, Chiayi	
2	2,319	91.30	Nari 2001	Wulai, New Taipei	
3	2,162	85.12	Flossie 1969	Beitou, Taipei	
4	1,987	78.23	Herb 1996	Alishan, Chiayi	
5	1,933	76.10	Gaemi 2024	Maolin, Kaoshiung	
6	1,774	69.84	Saola 2012	Yilan City	
7	1,725	67.91	Krathon 2024	Beinan, Taitung	
8	1,700	66.93	Lynn 1987	Taipei	
9	1,672	65.83	Clara 1967	Dongshan, Yilan	
10	1,611	63.43	Sinlaku 2008	Heping, Taichung	

Sinlaku brought torrential and almost endless rain over most of Luzon from September 8 to the 11th. It caused floods especially in the province of Zambales, forcing some people to evacuate. At least 12 people were killed and another 10 were reported as missing in Taiwan. Two others were found in a river as officials searched for the missing. They're considered to have been killed by an event related to Sinlaku. A large section of a 2,000 ft bridge collapsed with five people on it after heavy rain caused supports to break. Three other bridges were washed out. Three people were killed after a large landslide over a tunnel caused it to collapse. The storm caused at least $22.2 million in damages to agriculture. About 120,000 residences lost power during the storm. During the storm, 1,000 people were evacuated from low-lying areas which were at risk from flooding.

== See also ==
- Other tropical cyclones named Sinlaku
- Other tropical cyclones named Marce
- Tropical cyclones in 2008
- List of the wettest tropical cyclones
- Typhoon Tembin (2012)
- Typhoon Phanfone (2014)
- Typhoon Gaemi (2024)
