= List of storms named Nuri =

The name Nuri (Malay: nuri, [nu.ri]) has been used for four tropical cyclones in the western North Pacific Ocean. The name was contributed by Malaysia and means parrot in Malay. It replaced Rusa (Malay: rusa, [ru.sa]), which means deer in Malay, after it was retired following the 2002 Pacific typhoon season.

- Typhoon Nuri (2008) (T0812, 13W, Karen) – affected the Philippines, Hong Kong and China during August 2008.
- Typhoon Nuri (2014) (T1420, 20W, Paeng) – the third most intense tropical cyclone in 2014; later affected Alaska as a strong extratropical storm.
- Tropical Storm Nuri (2020) (T2002, 02W, Butchoy) – made landfall in the Philippines and affected Southern China.
- Tropical Storm Nuri (2026) (T2603, 03W) – weak and short-lived storm that stayed out to sea

Preceded by Penha	Pacific typhoon season names Nuri	Succeeded by Sinlaku
