= Kosraean language =

Oceanic language spoken in Micronesia

Kosraean
- Native to: Federated States of Micronesia
- Region: Kosrae
- Native speakers: 9,000 (2001)
- Language family: Austronesian: Malayo-Polynesian; Oceanic; Micronesian; Micronesian Proper; Nuclear Micronesian; Kosraean

Official status
- Official language in: Federated States of Micronesia

Language codes
- ISO 639-2: kos
- ISO 639-3: kos
- Glottolog: kosr1238
- ELP: Kosraean
- Map showing the distribution of the Micronesian languages; Kosraean-speaking region is shaded green.

- Kosraean is classified as Severely Endangered by the UNESCO Atlas of the World's Languages in Danger.

Kosraean (/koʊˈʃaɪən/ koh-SHY-ən; sometimes rendered Kusaiean) is the language spoken on the islands of Kosrae (Kusaie), a nation-state of the Federated States of Micronesia, Caroline Islands. In 2001 there were approximately 8,000 speakers in Micronesia, and 9,060 in all countries.

Kosraean features possessive classes such as "sihk" for "mine" when referring to dwellings, and "nihmuhk" for "mine" when referring to drinks.

== Introduction ==
=== History ===
Kosrae is the easternmost island in the Federated States of Micronesia. The island was under nominal Spanish sovereignty since 1668, but it was not effectively occupied until 1885. The Spaniards converted the local population to Christianity and had control over the island until 1898 when the Spaniards lost the Spanish–American War to the United States. Spain sold the Caroline islands (of which Kosrae is a part) to Germany for 25 million pesetas. Thus, it came under German control, until they were defeated in World War I, at which time the island then fell under the Empire of Japan's control. This colonization by a variety of countries resulted in many of the Kosraean people being bilingual. Evidence of this can be seen today, as some of them are still able to speak Japanese. After the end of World War II, administration of the island was passed to the United States until 1986 when they became independent.

=== Population ===
According to Ethnologue, there are approximately 8,000 native Kosraean speakers found in Micronesia (6.2% of the population). There are also additional Kosraean communities found outside of Micronesia. The native language of people of Kosrae is officially known as Kosraean.

Like many indigenous languages in Micronesia, schoolchildren often use Kosraean for instructions between grades 1–3 and later use both Kosraean and English in grades 4–5.

=== Classification ===
Kosraean is classified as, Austronesian, Malayo-Polynesian, Central-Eastern Malayo-Polynesian, Eastern Malayo-Polynesian, Oceanic, Central-Eastern Oceanic, Remote Oceanic, Micronesian, Micronesian Proper, Kusaiean.

== Phonology ==
=== Consonants ===
	Labial		Dental			Post-alveolar			Velar		
	nor.	vel.	nor.	vel.	rnd.	nor.	vel.	rnd.	nor.	vel.	rnd.
Stop	p ⟨p⟩	pˠ ⟨pw⟩	t ⟨t⟩	tˠ ⟨tw⟩	tʷ ⟨to⟩				k ⟨k⟩	kˠ ⟨kw⟩	kʷ ⟨ko⟩
Fricative	f ⟨f⟩	fˠ ⟨fw⟩	s ⟨s⟩	sˠ ⟨sw⟩	sʷ ⟨so⟩	ʂ ⟨sr⟩	ʂˠ ⟨srw⟩	ʂʷ ⟨sro⟩			
Nasal	m ⟨m⟩	mˠ ⟨mw⟩	n ⟨n⟩	nˠ ⟨nw⟩	nʷ ⟨no⟩				ŋ ⟨ng⟩	ŋˠ ⟨ngw⟩	ŋʷ ⟨ngo⟩
Approximant	w ⟨w⟩	wˠ ⟨wo⟩	l ⟨l⟩	lˠ ⟨lw⟩	lʷ ⟨lo⟩	j ⟨y⟩	jˠ ⟨yw⟩	jʷ ⟨yo⟩			
Flap						ɽ ⟨r⟩	ɽˠ ⟨rw⟩	ɽʷ ⟨ro⟩			

=== Vowels ===
	Front	Central	Back
High	i ⟨i⟩ iː ⟨ii⟩	ɨ ⟨ih⟩ ɨː ⟨iih⟩	u ⟨u⟩ uː ⟨uu⟩
Mid	e ⟨e⟩ eː ⟨ee⟩	ə ⟨uc⟩ əː ⟨uuc⟩	o ⟨o⟩ oː ⟨oo⟩
Low-mid	ɛ ⟨ac⟩ ɛː ⟨aac⟩	ʌ ⟨uh⟩ ʌː ⟨uuh⟩	ɔ ⟨oh⟩ ɔː ⟨ooh⟩
Low	æː ⟨ah⟩	aː ⟨a⟩	ɒ͡ɑ ⟨oa⟩

A half-rounded, double back-vowel sound is phonemically written as /oa/, and phonetically pronounced as [ɒ͡ɑ]. When occurring in an elongated position, the [ɑ] is elongated as [ɒɑː].

Vowel length is not marked in the orthography.

=== Historical sound changes ===
Kosraean reflexes of Proto Oceanic consonants
Proto-Oceanic	*mp	*mp,ŋp	*p	*m	*m,ŋm	*k	*ŋk	*ŋ	*y	*w	*t		*s,nj	*ns,j	*j	*nt,nd	*d,R	*l	*n	*ɲ
Proto-Micronesian	*p	*pʷ	*f	*m	*mʷ	*k	*x	*ŋ	*y	*w	*t	*T	*s	*S	*Z	*c	*r	*l	*n	*ɲ
Kosraean	*p	*f	*∅^{1}	*m	*w,m^{2}	*k	*k,∅^{3}	*ŋ	*∅	*∅	*t,s^{4}	*s	*t,s^{5}	*∅	*s	*sr	*l,r^{3}	*l	*n	*∅

^{1} See Jackson 1983:329–330 for explanation of apparent exceptions.
^{2} At the end of a word.
^{3} Before /u/, but with rare exceptions.
^{4} Before /e/ or /i/.
^{5} In loans only.

=== Orthography ===
Kosraean uses the Latin alphabet as its writing system, as it had not been documented in written form prior to Lee's dictionary in the 1970s. On the whole, the Kosraean vowel system includes many more vowels than can be represented by the basic Latin writing system, and this means that the spelling of words can be complicated and not accurately reflective of the language's phonology. In his 1976 Kosraean-English dictionary, Lee included a pronunciation guide in order to account for the discrepancies between the usage of letters for certain sounds in English versus in Kosraean.

== Grammar ==
=== Basic word order ===
The main word order in Kosraean is SVO, but can sometimes change with the different kind of sentences said. Lee (1975) presented the following sentence Kosreaen:

Mwet ah tuh ahsack ik ah
people DET PST catch fish DET
the people caught the fish

For interrogative sentences, which are used to ask questions, the word order stays relatively the same, but can change as well. Lee (1975) writes a question in Kosraean "Kuh kom mas?", which means "Are you sick?" But when the sentence includes an interrogative word such as the word "fuhkah" which means "how", then the structure can change. For example, "kuh kom mas" means "are you ok", but when you include the word "fuhkah" at the end of the sentence, "Kuh kom fuhka", it means "How are you?". So there are a couple of ways you could interpret an interrogative sentence in Kosraean, but most of the sentences are in SVO form.

=== Reduplication ===
Reduplication is a major feature of Kosraean. Lee (1975), states that there are two types of reduplication: complete reduplication, when an entire word is repeated, and partial reduplication, when only part of the word is repeated. Reduplication in Kosraean uses two distinct morphemes: a prefix and a suffix.

Reduplication manifests differently depending on the consonant and vowel structure of the word. For example: the complete reduplication of CV:C word "fact" (fat) results in "factfact", translating to "very fat". This can also be seen in the word "lahs" (coral), which becomes "lahs-lahs", meaning "lots of coral".

The complete reduplication of V:C words differ. Lee (1975) states that "when monosyllabic words of the V:C shape undergo complete reduplication, the glide y appears before the second syllable in some words". The word "af" (rain), reduplicates to "af-yaf", which translates to "rainy". Complete reduplication commonly indicates an increase in quantity or significance over the base form of the word.

As for partial reduplication, Lee (1975) states that "when a monosyllabic word undergoes partial reduplication, the first consonant and the vowel are repeated". For example, the partially reduplicated form of "fosr" (smoke), is "fo-fosr" which means "to emit smoke". Multi-syllable words are slightly more complex. The two-syllable "fule" becomes "ful-fu-le".

=== Verbs ===
Lee (1975) states that verbs in Kosraean are structurally either simple, complex, or compound verbs. Simple verbs consist of a single free morpheme, complex verbs consist of one free morpheme combined with one or more bound morphemes, and compound verbs are a combination of more than one free morpheme which may or may not be combined with bound morphemes. According to Lee (1975), "The verbs in Kusaiean can be classified into transitive and intransitive verbs." Lee (1975) states that one way to tell if a verb is transitive or intransitive is to combine it with the passive suffix -yuhk. Lee (1975) determined that "The passive suffix can be used with transitive verbs, but not with intransitive verbs."

=== Adjectives ===
According to Lee (1975) adjectives in Kosraean have two major uses. Lee (1975) states that the first major use is to "modify nouns in terms of the kind, state, condition, or quality." The second major use is similar to that of intransitive verbs in Kosraean, and the adjective serves a "predicate like function". Lee (1975) also states that "The distinction between adjectives and intransitive verbs is not easy to draw."

=== Determiners ===
Lee (1975) found that structurally, there are two types of determiners in Kosraean, referred to as "simple" and "compound". Simple determiners in Kosraean include "ah" meaning "the", "uh" meaning "this" or "these", "an" meaning "that" or "those", and "oh" meaning "that" or "those over there". According to Lee (1975) compound determiners can be further broken up into two separate categories. The first category is "made up of the numeral se 'one' and the simple determiners. The second category is "made up of the morpheme ng, whose meaning is not clear, and the simple determiners."

== Vocabulary ==
Indigenous Vocabulary:

- "fosr"= smoke
- "pysre"= to steal
- "in-sifac"= head
- "infohk"= earth
- "tuhram"= bird

Basic Kosraean sentences:

- "Lotu wo" = good morning
- "Fong wo" = good night
- "Kulo" = thank you
- "Kom fuhkah" = how are you?
- "muta" = goodbye
- "Su inec an?" = what is your name?
- "Inek pa..." = my name is...
- "Awok" = yes
- "Mo" = no

Due to the language's contact with other languages and cultures through colonization, there are many loanwords in the lexicon, especially from English and Japanese. These borrowed words have been altered in order to fit with the phonology of Kosraean. Some examples include:

- kacluhn. N. gallon [Eng.]
- kacm. N. camp [Eng.]
- nappa. N. cabbage [Jpn.]
- paka. ADJ. out of order, missing, run-down [Jpn.]

== Endangerment ==
=== Materials ===
There are not too many materials or resources on the Kosraean Language, but there are a few books and sources online people can research from. There are a couple YouTube videos on the Kosraean people and language, and some singing in the language. Lee Ki Dong wrote the Kosraean Reference Grammar, and the Kosraean-English Dictionary. Elizabeth Baldwin translated the Bible into then Kusaie in 1928, and the American Bible Society printed it in 1953.

=== Vitality ===
Intergenerational transmission is key to the survival of a language, as a language needs younger generations to pass on the language to the next generation and so forth. Kosraean is used as the primary language on the island, with English being the second official language and usually only used as a Lingua Franca or in official business contexts.
