= List of retired Pacific typhoon names =

This is a list of all Pacific typhoons that have had their names retired from the international list of tropical cyclone names used in the Western Pacific Ocean. Since tropical cyclones started to be named in the basin after World War II a total of 96 typhoon names have been retired. Those typhoons that have their names retired tend to be exceptionally destructive storms. Several names were removed or altered naming list for various reasons other than retirement.

== History ==
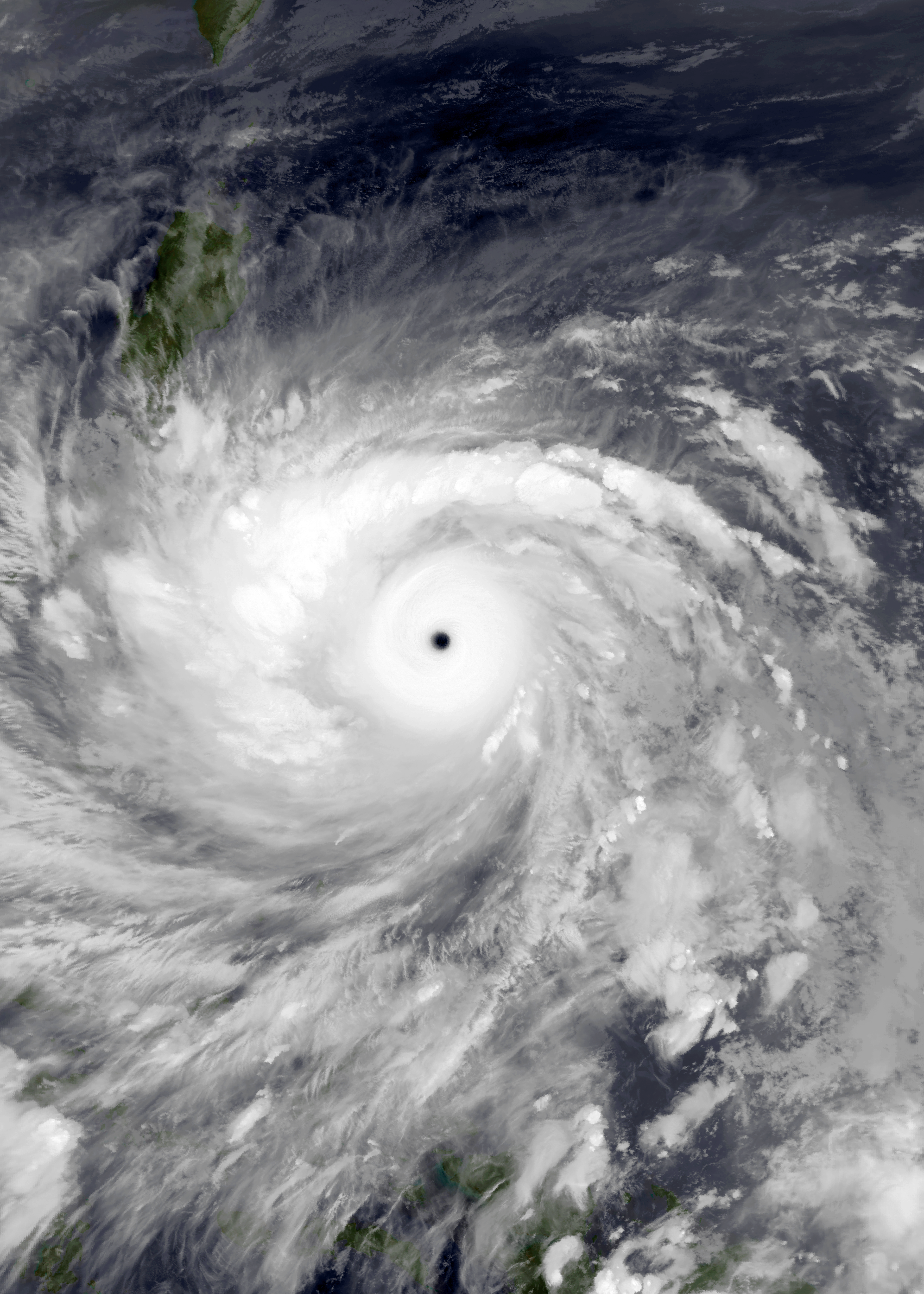
Typhoon Haiyan at peak intensity

During the latter stages of World War II, forecasters with the United States Armed Forces started to informally name tropical cyclones that occurred over the Pacific Ocean, after their wives and sweethearts. In 1945, after the practice had become popular among forecasters who found that it reduced confusion during map discussions, the USAAF formalised the scheme and started to publicly assign female names to systems in the Northern Hemisphere and male names to tropical cyclones that occurred in the Southern Hemisphere. Over the next few years, the names were chosen by the 2143 Air Weather Wing and were assigned to systems when they were first established as a typhoon by warning centres in Guam, Japan or the Philippines. During 1959, in an effort to reduce redundancy and improve communications, the United States Armed Forces consolidated its various typhoon warning centres into a Joint Typhoon Warning Center (JTWC), which took over the warning responsibilities on 1 May 1959. During the 1960s, the names Karen, Lucille and Ophelia were retired after Karen had impacted Guam, Lucille had killed 300 people in the Philippines and Ophelia had travelled over 5,000 mi (8,045 km). In 1963, the Philippine Weather Bureau started to use Filipino women's nicknames ending in "Ng" from A to Y to name all tropical cyclones that occurred within its self-defined area of responsibility, regardless of whether the JTWC had named it.

In October 1974, a United States reconnaissance aircraft and its crew of six went missing while it was investigating Typhoon Bess; as a result, the JTWC intended to replace the name with Bonnie. In August 1978, the JTWC initially named another tropical cyclone "Bess" before changing the system's name to "Bonnie" in subsequent warnings. After the 1979 tropical cyclone conference, the JTWC started to use a new list of tropical cyclone names that contained both male and female names, as well as the name Bess. At the 1983 tropical cyclone conference, the names Hazen and Pamela were retired after they had caused severe impacts to the Mariana Islands, while Bess was retired again after the 54th Weather Reconnaissance Squadron asked for it to be retired due to the loss of the crew in 1974. The name Ike was retired after it had made landfall in the Philippines and killed over 900 people during September 1984. Subsequently, the name Roy was retired after causing widespread damage to the Mariana Islands during January 1988. The naming list was updated at the 1989 tropical cyclone conference and was used after Typhoon Wayne (1989) had been named in September 1989. The names Mike, Mireille, Thelma and Omar were retired from the list of names in 1991, 1992 and 1993. During December 1997, Tropical Storm Paka moved into the basin and significantly impacted both the Marshall Islands and the Mariana Islands before its name was retired from the list of Pacific hurricane names.

In October 1995, the JTWC announced that it would introduce a new list of names in January 1996, drawn from an American baby book, rather than using regional names, to avoid tensions between countries. Later that year, the Hong Kong Observatory (HKO) proposed that the ESCAP/WMO's Typhoon Committee should be the body to name tropical cyclones over the basin, which it hoped would lead to the names being standardised over the region. In response, the committee noted that the implementation of the proposal would be a long process and that it would need to collaborate with other bodies, while it urged its members to consider the proposal ahead of discussions during forthcoming sessions. In November 1997, the committee revisited the proposal where it was suggested that the usage of Asian names over the region would make warnings more effective by enhancing people's alertness to an approaching tropical cyclone. As a result, it decided to endorse the proposal before instructing a task force to work out the details of the scheme and present a list of names for approval at the next session of the committee. The task force met during August 1998 and decided that each of the fourteen Committee members, including the United States and the Philippines, would submit ten names, which would then be used in alphabetical order based on the English alphabetical order of the contributing members name. It was also decided that the names would consist of no more than nine characters, be easy to pronounce, have no negative implications and not cause any difficulties for any contributor or be the name of a commercial brand. In the interests of harmony and cooperation, it was decided that any name proposed should have the support of all contributors and that a single objection would be sufficient to veto a proposed name. A list of 140 names was subsequently drawn up and submitted to the Typhoon Committee's 31st session, where the naming list was approved.

Over the next year, the spellings of a few of the names were slightly modified, before they started to be used by the Japan Meteorological Agency on 1 January 2000, with the first name, Damrey, being named on 7 May 2000. At its 33rd session in November 2000, the committee was informed that the India Meteorological Department had objected to the name Hanuman being used due to religious sentiments, while the United States requested that the name Kodo be changed as it would have an undesirable meaning if mispronounced. At the same session, the Thai Meteorological Department requested that the spellings of several names be corrected and indicated a desire to change the names Prapiroon, Durian and Khanun. In response, the committee accepted the spelling changes before establishing a procedure for the replacement of tropical cyclone names, so that all members would have a chance to comment on the appropriateness of the name. In November 2002, the committee retired the name Vamei after it became the first tropical cyclone to occur near the equator on record, while the names Rusa and Chataan were retired after impacting Micronesia, Korea and Japan. At its 37th session in November 2004, the committee decided to retire the names Pongsona, Maemi, Sudal and Rananim after they had impacted the Mariana Islands, the Philippines, China and Japan. During April 2005, the HKO in conjunction with RTHK's Radio 1 invited the public to submit names in both English and Chinese, after which a judging panel selected Taichi and Kapok as replacement names for Yanyan and Tingting, which were removed from the naming lists at Hong Kong's request. At its 38th session, the committee rejected the names Taichi and Kapok in favour of Dolphin and Lionrock, as the former had negative implications in other languages, while it retired the names Matsa, Nabi and Longwang after they had impacted the Mariana Islands, China, Japan, and South Korea.

During August 2006, Hurricane Ioke moved into the basin from the Central Pacific and significantly impacted Wake Island, before it was retired from the list of Pacific hurricane names. Later that year, the committee retired the names Chanchu, Bilis, Saomai, Xangsane and Durian, after they had caused significant impacts to the Philippines, Taiwan and China. There were no names retired by the committee after the 2007 and 2008 seasons, before the names Morakot, Ketsana, Parma, Fanapi, Washi, Bopha, Utor, Fitow and Haiyan were retired at the 42nd, 43rd, 44th, 45th and 46th sessions of the Typhoon Committee, after causing significant impacts to the Philippines, Taiwan and China. At the 46th session in 2014, the name Sonamu was also retired from the list, after it had caused unprecedented panic in coastal parts of eastern Malaysia, due to its similarity to the word "tsunami". The name Vicente was also removed to avoid any potential confusion, after it was noted that the name appeared on the naming lists for both the Western Pacific and the Eastern Pacific. Over the next few years, the names Rammasun, Soudelor, Mujigae, Koppu, Melor, Meranti, Sarika, Haima, Nock-ten, Hato, Kai-tak, Tembin, Rumbia, Mangkhut, Yutu, Lekima, Faxai, Hagibis, Kammuri, Phanfone, Vongfong, Linfa, Molave, Goni and Vamco were all retired after causing significant impacts to various countries in the region.

In April 2022, the Typhoon Committee received an email from the United Kingdom's Met Office (UKMO), which noted that there had been considerable reaction among Greek-speaking social media users to the name Malakas for a typhoon due to its alternative meaning. As a result, the name was retired by the committee at its 55th session in March 2023, along with the names Conson, Kompasu, Rai, Megi, Ma-on, Noru, Nalgae and Hinnamnor after they had impacted China, Korea, the Philippines and Vietnam. At the following three sessions, the names Doksuri, Saola, Haikui, Ewiniar, Yagi, Krathon, Trami, Kong-rey, Toraji, Usagi, Man-yi, Wipha, Co-May, Mitag, Ragasa, Bualoi, Matmo, Kalmaegi and Fung-wong were retired after they caused significant impacts to various countries in the basin. At the 57th session in February 2025, the committee also retired the name Jebi, after receiving an email from the UKMO which expressed concern over the name.

== Retired names ==
=== Pre-2000 ===
Retired Name	Replacement name	Dates active	Peak classification	Sustained windspeeds (10-min)	Pressure	Primary areas affected	Damage (USD)	Deaths	Refs
Lucille	Lucy	25 May – 4 June 1960	Tropical storm	Not Specified	985 hPa (29.09 inHg)	Philippines	$2 million	300–500	
Ophelia	Ora	21 November – 6 December 1960	Typhoon	Not Specified	925 hPa (27.32 inHg)	Caroline Islands	Unknown	2	
Karen	Kim	7 – 17 November 1962	Typhoon	Not Specified	900 hPa (26.58 inHg)	Guam	$250 million	11	
Bess	Bonnie	8 – 14 October 1974	Typhoon	Not Specified	975 hPa (28.79 inHg)	Philippines, China, Vietnam	$6.21 million	26	
Hazen	Hal	13 – 21 November 1981	Typhoon	130 km/h (80 mph)	955 hPa (28.20 inHg)	Caroline Islands, Mariana Islands, Philippines, South China	$1.52 million	4	
Bess	Brenda	21 July – 3 August 1982	Violent typhoon	230 km/h (145 mph)	900 hPa (26.58 inHg)	Japan	$2.32 billion	95	
Pamela	Peggy	23 November – 8 December 1982	Very strong typhoon	130 km/h (80 mph)	940 hPa (27.76 inHg)	Federated States of Micronesia, Mariana Islands, Philippines	$900,000	Unknown	
Ike	Ian	26 August – 6 September 1984	Very strong typhoon	165 km/h (105 mph)	950 hPa (28.05 inHg)	Guam, Philippines, China	$210 million	900	
Roy	Ryan	7 – 19 January 1988	Very strong typhoon	155 km/h (100 mph)	940 hPa (27.76 inHg)	Micronesia, Philippines	$28.5 million	2	
Mike	Manny	5 – 18 November 1990	Very strong typhoon	185 km/h (115 mph)	915 hPa (27.02 inHg)	Micronesia, Philippines, China	$395 million	508	
Mireille	Melissa	13 – 27 September 1991	Very strong typhoon	185 km/h (115 mph)	925 hPa (27.32 inHg)	Mariana Islands, Japan, South Korea	$10 billion	66	
Thelma	Teresa	1 – 8 November 1991	Tropical storm	75 km/h (45 mph)	992 hPa (29.29 inHg)	Philippines, Vietnam	$100 million	5,101	
Omar	Oscar	20 August – 6 September 1992	Very strong typhoon	185 km/h (115 mph)	920 hPa (27.17 inHg)	Mariana Islands, Taiwan, China	$490 million	12	
13 names	References: (Note: Reference for dates, season, wind speeds and pressure between 1951 and 2025) (Note: Reference for the retired names between 1947 and 2010.) (Note: Reference for the names Bess, Hazen and Pamela being retired.) (Note: Reference for the retired names between 1947 and 2022.)								

=== 2000s ===
Retired Name	Replacement name	Dates active	Peak classification	Sustained windspeeds (10-min)	Pressure	Primary areas affected	Damage (USD)	Deaths	Refs
Vamei	Peipah	26 December 2001 – 1 January 2002	Tropical storm	85 km/h (50 mph)	1006 hPa (29.71 inHg)	Singapore, Malaysia, Indonesia	$3.6 million	5	
Chataan	Matmo	27 June – 13 July 2002	Very strong typhoon	175 km/h (110 mph)	930 hPa (27.46 inHg)	Chuuk, Guam, Japan	$66.5 million	87	
Rusa	Nuri	22 August – 4 September 2002	Typhoon	150 km/h (90 mph)	950 hPa (28.05 inHg)	Japan, Korean Peninsula	$4.2 billion	216	
Pongsona	Noul	2 – 12 December 2002	Very strong typhoon	165 km/h (105 mph)	940 hPa (27.76 inHg)	Mariana Islands	$700 million	1	
Yanyan	Dolphin	11 – 21 January 2003	Tropical storm	65 km/h (40 mph)	1000 hPa (29.53 inHg)	Mariana Islands	None	None	
Imbudo	Molave	15 – 25 July 2003	Very strong typhoon	165 km/h (105 mph)	935 hPa (27.61 inHg)	Philippines, China	$126 million	41	
Maemi	Mujigae	4 – 16 September 2003	Violent typhoon	195 km/h (120 mph)	910 hPa (26.87 inHg)	Korean Peninsula	$4.55 billion	118	
Sudal	Mirinae	2 – 18 April 2004	Very strong typhoon	165 km/h (105 mph)	940 hPa (27.76 inHg)	Yap, Guam	$14 million	None	
Tingting	Lionrock	24 June – 4 July 2004	Typhoon	150 km/h (90 mph)	955 hPa (28.20 inHg)	Mariana Islands, Japan	$11.2 million	7	
Rananim	Fanapi	6 – 15 August 2004	Typhoon	150 km/h (90 mph)	950 hPa (28.05 inHg)	China	$2.19 billion	188	
Matsa	Pakhar	30 July – 9 August 2005	Typhoon	150 km/h (90 mph)	950 hPa (28.05 inHg)	Taiwan, China	$852 million	25	
Nabi	Doksuri	29 August – 9 September 2005	Very strong typhoon	175 km/h (110 mph)	925 hPa (27.32 inHg)	Mariana Islands, Japan, South Korea	$1.01 billion	37	
Longwang	Haikui	25 September – 3 October 2005	Very strong typhoon	175 km/h (110 mph)	930 hPa (27.46 inHg)	Taiwan, China	$250 million	149	
Chanchu	Sanba	8 – 19 May 2006	Very strong typhoon	175 km/h (110 mph)	930 hPa (27.46 inHg)	Philippines, Taiwan, China, Vietnam	$478 million	276	
Bilis	Maliksi	8 – 16 July 2006	Severe tropical storm	110 km/h (70 mph)	970 hPa (28.64 inHg)	Philippines, Taiwan, China	$3.33 billion	877	
Saomai	Son-Tinh	4 – 11 August 2006	Violent typhoon	195 km/h (120 mph)	925 hPa (27.32 inHg)	Mariana Islands, Taiwan, China	$2.51 billion	456	
Xangsane	Leepi	25 September – 2 October 2006	Very strong typhoon	155 km/h (100 mph)	940 hPa (27.76 inHg)	Philippines, Indochina	$737 million	300	
Durian	Mangkhut	25 November – 7 December 2006	Violent typhoon	195 km/h (120 mph)	915 hPa (27.02 inHg)	Philippines, Indochina	$522 million	1,494	
Morakot	Atsani	2 – 12 August 2009	Typhoon	140 km/h (85 mph)	945 hPa (27.91 inHg)	Philippines, Taiwan, China, Korea	$1.69 billion	664	
Ketsana	Champi	23 – 30 September 2009	Typhoon	130 km/h (80 mph)	960 hPa (28.35 inHg)	Philippines, Indochina	$1.12 billion	679	
Parma	In-fa	27 September – 14 October 2009	Very strong typhoon	185 km/h (115 mph)	930 hPa (27.46 inHg)	Philippines, China, Vietnam	$626 million	472	
21 names	References: (Note: Reference for the retired names between 2000 and 2024.)						$33.8 billion	5,849	

=== 2010s ===
Retired Name	Replacement name	Dates active	Peak classification	Sustained windspeeds (10-min)	Pressure	Primary areas affected	Damage (USD)	Deaths	Refs
Fanapi	Rai	14 – 21 September 2010	Very strong typhoon	175 km/h (110 mph)	930 hPa (27.46 inHg)	Taiwan, China	$361 million	77	
Washi	Hato	13 – 19 December 2011	Severe tropical storm	95 km/h (60 mph)	992 hPa (29.29 inHg)	Micronesia, Palau, Philippines	$47.2 million	1,268	
Vicente	Lan	18 – 25 July 2012	Typhoon	150 km/h (90 mph)	950 hPa (28.05 inHg)	Philippines, China, Indochina	$329 million	13	
Bopha	Ampil	25 November – 9 December 2012	Very strong typhoon	185 km/h (115 mph)	930 hPa (27.46 inHg)	Micronesia, Philippines	$901 million	1,067	
Sonamu	Jongdari	1 – 10 January 2013	Severe tropical storm	95 km/h (60 mph)	990 hPa (29.23 inHg)	Philippines, Vietnam, Malaysia	Minimal	2	
Utor	Barijat	8 – 18 August 2013	Violent typhoon	195 km/h (120 mph)	925 hPa (27.32 inHg)	Philippines, China	$35.5 million	97	
Fitow	Mun	29 September – 7 October 2013	Typhoon	140 km/h (85 mph)	960 hPa (28.35 inHg)	China, Taiwan, Japan	$6.7 billion	11	
Haiyan	Bailu	3 – 11 November 2013	Violent typhoon	230 km/h (145 mph)	895 hPa (26.43 inHg)	Palau, Philippines, Vietnam, China	$3.08 billion	6,346	
Rammasun	Bualoi	9 – 20 July 2014	Very strong typhoon	165 km/h (105 mph)	935 hPa (27.61 inHg)	Philippines, China, Vietnam	$5.1 billion	221	
Soudelor	Saudel	29 July – 11 August 2015	Violent typhoon	215 km/h (130 mph)	900 hPa (26.58 inHg)	Mariana Islands, Japan, Taiwan, China	$1.28 billion	45	
Mujigae	Surigae	30 September – 5 October 2015	Very strong typhoon	155 km/h (100 mph)	950 hPa (28.05 inHg)	Philippines, China	$4.2 billion	29	
Koppu	Koguma	12 – 21 October 2015	Very strong typhoon	185 km/h (115 mph)	925 hPa (27.32 inHg)	Philippines	$307 million	58	
Melor	Cempaka	9 – 17 December 2015	Very strong typhoon	175 km/h (110 mph)	935 hPa (27.61 inHg)	Philippines	$150 million	51	
Meranti	Nyatoh	9 – 16 September 2016	Violent typhoon	220 km/h (140 mph)	890 hPa (26.28 inHg)	Philippines, Taiwan, China	$2.37 billion	45	
Sarika	Trases	13 – 19 October 2016	Very strong typhoon	175 km/h (110 mph)	935 hPa (27.61 inHg)	Philippines, China, Vietnam	$968 million	1	
Haima	Mulan	14 – 22 October 2016	Violent typhoon	215 km/h (130 mph)	900 hPa (26.58 inHg)	Philippines, Taiwan, China	$75.4 million	14	
Nock-ten	Hinnamnor	20 – 28 December 2016	Violent typhoon	195 km/h (120 mph)	915 hPa (27.02 inHg)	Philippines	$128 million	13	
Hato	Yamaneko	19 – 24 August 2017	Typhoon	140 km/h (85 mph)	965 hPa (28.50 inHg)	Philippines, Taiwan, China, Vietnam	$7.11 billion	32	
Kai-tak	Yun-yeung	13 – 23 December 2017	Tropical storm	75 km/h (45 mph)	994 hPa (29.35 inHg)	Philippines, Malaysia	$79.1 million	47	
Tembin	Koinu	20 – 26 December 2017	Typhoon	130 km/h (80 mph)	970 hPa (28.64 inHg)	Philippines, Malaysia, Vietnam	$42.1 million	266	
Rumbia	Pulasan	15 – 18 August 2018	Tropical storm	85 km/h (50 mph)	985 hPa (29.09 inHg)	China	$5.4 billion	53	
Mangkhut	Krathon	7 – 17 September 2018	Violent typhoon	205 km/h (125 mph)	905 hPa (26.72 inHg)	Mariana Islands, Philippines, China	$1.43 billion	88	
Yutu	Yinxing	21 October – 2 November 2018	Violent typhoon	215 km/h (130 mph)	900 hPa (26.58 inHg)	Micronesia, Philippines	$2 billion	23	
Lekima	Co-May	2 – 13 August 2019	Violent typhoon	195 km/h (120 mph)	925 hPa (27.32 inHg)	Taiwan, China, Korea	$26.1 billion	74	
Faxai	Nongfa	2 – 9 September 2019	Very strong typhoon	155 km/h (100 mph)	955 hPa (28.20 inHg)	Japan, Wake Island	$9.1 billion	3	
Hagibis	Ragasa	4 – 13 October 2019	Violent typhoon	195 km/h (120 mph)	915 hPa (27.02 inHg)	Mariana Islands, Japan	$17 billion	99	
Kammuri	Koto	24 November – 6 December 2019	Very strong typhoon	165 km/h (105 mph)	950 hPa (28.05 inHg)	Micronesia, Philippines	$131 million	17	
Phanfone	Nokaen	19 – 29 December 2019	Typhoon	150 km/h (90 mph)	970 hPa (28.64 inHg)	Caroline Islands, Philippines	$86.5 million	57	
28 names	References:						$89.6 billion	11,196	

=== 2020s ===
Retired Name	Replacement name	Dates active	Peak classification	Sustained windspeeds (10-min)	Pressure	Primary areas affected	Damage (USD)	Deaths	Refs
Vongfong	Penha	8 – 18 May 2020	Very strong typhoon	155 km/h (100 mph)	960 hPa (28.35 inHg)	Philippines, Taiwan	$31 million	None	
Linfa	Peilou	6 – 11 October 2020	Tropical storm	85 km/h (50 mph)	994 hPa (29.35 inHg)	Vietnam, Laos, Cambodia, Thailand	$95 million	295	
Molave	Narra	22 – 29 October 2020	Very strong typhoon	165 km/h (105 mph)	940 hPa (27.76 inHg)	Philippines, Indochina	$1.02 billion	68	
Goni	Gaenari	26 October – 6 November 2020	Violent typhoon	220 km/h (140 mph)	905 hPa (26.72 inHg)	Philippines, Indochina	$371 million	25	
Vamco	Bang-Lang	8 – 16 November 2020	Very strong typhoon	155 km/h (100 mph)	955 hPa (28.20 inHg)	Philippines, Thailand	$420 million	51	
Conson	Luc-Binh	5 – 13 September 2021	Severe tropical storm	95 km/h (60 mph)	992 hPa (29.29 inHg)	Philippines, China, Vietnam	$27.7 million	22	
Kompasu	Tokei	7 – 14 October 2021	Severe tropical storm	100 km/h (65 mph)	975 hPa (28.79 inHg)	Philippines, China, Indochina	$145 million	46	
Rai	Sarbul	11 – 21 December 2021	Violent typhoon	195 km/h (120 mph)	915 hPa (27.02 inHg)	Palau, Philippines, Taiwan, China, Vietnam	$1.02 billion	408	
Malakas	Amuyao	6 – 15 April 2022	Very strong typhoon	165 km/h (105 mph)	945 hPa (27.91 inHg)	Yap State	Minimal	None	
Megi	Gosari	8 – 12 April 2022	Tropical storm	75 km/h (45 mph)	996 hPa (29.41 inHg)	Philippines	$39 million	214	
Ma-on	Tsing-ma	20 – 26 August 2022	Severe tropical storm	100 km/h (65 mph)	985 hPa (29.09 inHg)	Philippines, Southern China, Vietnam	$43.6 million	3	
Hinnamnor	Ong-mang	27 August – 6 September 2022	Violent typhoon	195 km/h (120 mph)	920 hPa (27.17 inHg)	Philippines, Taiwan, Japan, Korea, Russia	$1.39 million	13	
Noru	Hodu	21 – 29 September 2022	Very strong typhoon	175 km/h (110 mph)	940 hPa (27.76 inHg)	Philippines, Indochina	$59.4 million	12	
Nalgae	Jamjari	26 October – 3 November 2022	Severe tropical storm	110 km/h (70 mph)	975 hPa (28.79 inHg)	Philippines, Southern China	$170 million	168	
Doksuri	Bori	20 – 30 July 2023	Very strong typhoon	185 km/h (115 mph)	925 hPa (27.32 inHg)	Palau, Philippines, Taiwan, China, Vietnam	$25.3 billion	87	
Saola	Saobien	22 August – 3 September 2023	Violent typhoon	195 km/h (120 mph)	920 hPa (27.17 inHg)	Philippines, South China, Taiwan, Northern Vietnam	$734 million	10	
Haikui	Tianma	27 August – 6 September 2023	Very strong typhoon	155 km/h (100 mph)	945 hPa (27.91 inHg)	Taiwan, Philippines, China	$734 million	10	
Ewiniar	Tirou	23 May – 6 June 2024	Typhoon	140 km/h (85 mph)	970 hPa (28.64 inHg)	Philippines	$17.7 million	6	
Yagi	Tomo	31 August – 9 September 2024	Violent typhoon	195 km/h (120 mph)	915 hPa (27.02 inHg)	Palau, Philippines, South China, Indochina	$45 million	880	
Jebi	Narae	25 September – 2 October 2024	Typhoon	120 km/h (75 mph)	980 hPa (28.94 inHg)	Mariana Islands, Japan	None	None	
Krathon	Burapha	26 September – 3 October 2024	Violent typhoon	195 km/h (120 mph)	920 hPa (27.17 inHg)	Philippines, Taiwan, Ryukyu Islands	$27.1 million	13	
Trami	Hoaban	18 – 29 October 2024	Severe tropical storm	110 km/h (70 mph)	970 hPa (28.64 inHg)	Palau, Philippines, Taiwan, South China, Indochina	$126 million	176	
Kong-rey	Koki	24 October – 1 November 2024	Very strong typhoon	185 km/h (115 mph)	925 hPa (27.32 inHg)	Philippines, Taiwan, East China, South Korea, Japan	$126 million	176	
Toraji	Gaeguri	8 – 15 November 2024	Typhoon	130 km/h (80 mph)	980 hPa (28.94 inHg)	Philippines, Taiwan, South China	$65 million	14	
Usagi	Hebi	9 – 16 November 2024	Very strong typhoon	175 km/h (110 mph)	940 hPa (27.76 inHg)	Philippines, Taiwan	$65 million	14	
Man-yi	Dim-sum	7 – 20 November 2024	Violent typhoon	195 km/h (120 mph)	920 hPa (27.17 inHg)	Marina Islands, Philippines, Taiwan, South China	$65 million	14	
Wipha	TBA	16 – 22 July 2025	Severe tropical storm	110 km/h (70 mph)	975 hPa (28.79 inHg)	Philippines, Taiwan, South China, Indochina	>$717 million	20	(Note: According to the Philippine National Disaster Risk Reduction and Management Council: Tropical Storms Wipha (Crising), Francisco (Dante) and Comay (Emong) caused a total of 34 deaths and PHP21.4 billion (US$363 million) in damage.)
Co-May	TBA	22 July – 3 August 2025	Severe tropical storm	110 km/h (70 mph)	975 hPa (28.79 inHg)	Philippines, Taiwan, Eastern China	>$42.9 million	29	
Mitag	TBA	15 – 20 September 2025	Severe tropical storm	95 km/h (60 mph)	992 hPa (29.29 inHg)	Philippines, Taiwan, Southern China	Unknown	Unknown	(Note: According to the Philippine National Disaster Risk Reduction and Management Council: Tropical Storms Mitag (Mirasol), Typhoon Ragasa (Nando) and Typhoon Bualoi (Opong) caused a total of 42 deaths and PHP5 billion (US$84.8 million) in damage.)
Ragasa	TBA	16 – 25 September 2025	Violent typhoon	205 km/h (125 mph)	905 hPa (26.72 inHg)	Philippines, Taiwan, South China, Indochina	Unknown	Unknown	
Bualoi	TBA	22 - 29 September 2025	Typhoon	120 km/h (75 mph)	975 hPa (28.79 inHg)	Philippines, South China, Indochina	Unknown	Unknown	
Matmo	TBA	30 September – 6 October 2025	Typhoon	130 km/h (80 mph)	975 hPa (28.79 inHg)	Philippines, South China, Indochina	>$1.8 million	0	
Kalmaegi	TBA	31 October – 7 November 2025	Very strong typhoon	165 km/h (105 mph)	950 hPa (28.05 inHg)	Philippines, Indochina	>$18 million	253	
Fung-wong	TBA	4 – 13 November 2025	Very strong typhoon	175 km/h (110 mph)	935 hPa (27.61 inHg)	Philippines, Taiwan, Eastern China,	>$75 million	26	
34 names	References:						$29.7 billion	2,511	

== See also ==
- List of retired Atlantic hurricane names
- List of retired Pacific hurricane names
- List of retired Philippine typhoon names
- List of retired Australian region cyclone names
- List of retired South Pacific cyclone names
