= Tropical Storm Bilis =

Pacific severe tropical storm in 2006

Severe Tropical Storm Bilis (Florita)
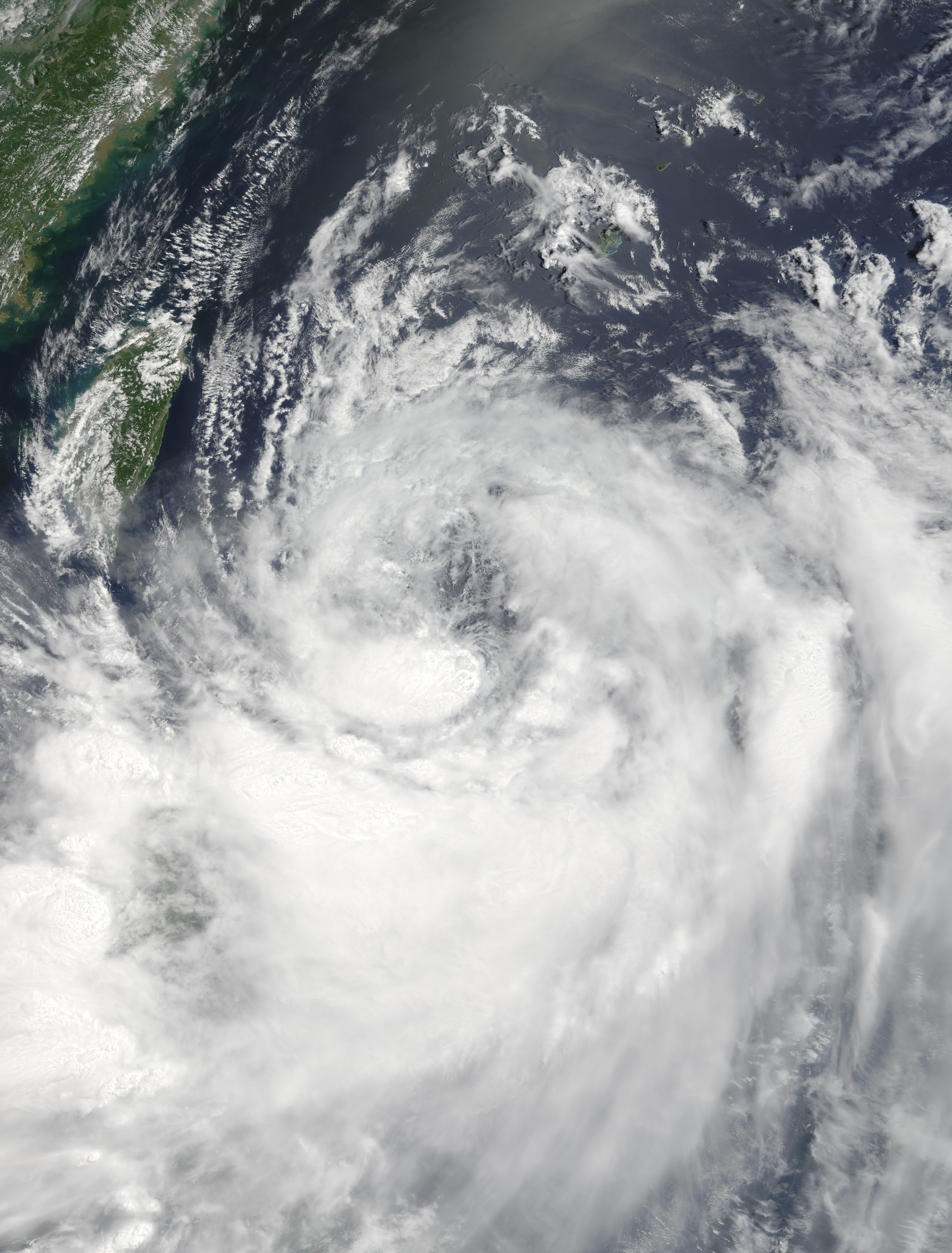
- Severe Tropical Storm Bilis near peak intensity on July 12

Meteorological history
- Formed: July 8, 2006
- Dissipated: July 17, 2006

Severe tropical storm
- 10-minute sustained (JMA)
- Highest winds: 110 km/h (70 mph)
- Lowest pressure: 970 hPa (mbar); 28.64 inHg

Tropical storm
- 1-minute sustained (SSHWS/JTWC)
- Highest winds: 95 km/h (60 mph)
- Lowest pressure: 985 hPa (mbar); 29.09 inHg

Overall effects
- Fatalities: 859 total
- Damage: $4.4 billion (2006 USD)
- Areas affected: Philippines, Taiwan, China
- IBTrACS
- Part of the 2006 Pacific typhoon season

Severe Tropical Storm Bilis, (Note: The name Bilis (Tagalog: bilis, [bɪ.ˈlɪs]) was contributed by the Philippines and means speed in Tagalog.) known in the Philippines as Tropical Storm Florita, was a costly and deadly tropical cyclone that caused catastrophic damage to numerous areas of the Philippines, Taiwan, and southeastern China in mid-July 2006.

Despite never officially reaching typhoon strength, Bilis was responsible for $4.4 billion (2006 USD) in damage and 859 fatalities in the Philippines, Taiwan, and China. Most of the damage was caused by heavy rain, which triggered widespread flash flooding and landslides. Many of the areas Bilis flooded were later affected by Typhoon Kaemi, Typhoon Prapiroon, and intense Typhoon Saomai.

== Meteorological history ==
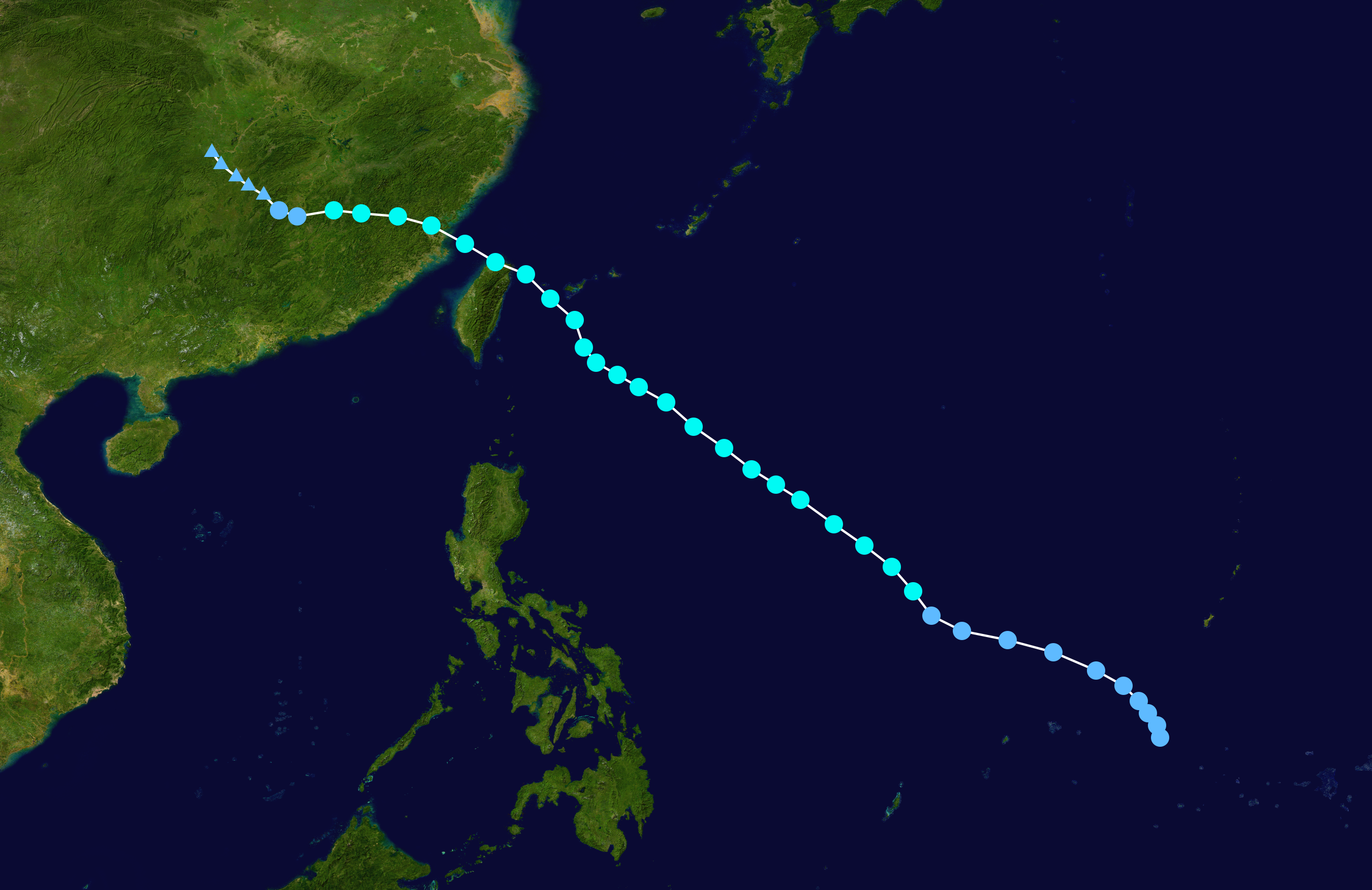
Map plotting the storm's track and intensity, according to the Saffir–Simpson scale Map key Saffir–Simpson scale Tropical depression (≤38 mph, ≤62 km/h) Tropical storm (39–73 mph, 63–118 km/h) Category 1 (74–95 mph, 119–153 km/h) Category 2 (96–110 mph, 154–177 km/h) Category 3 (111–129 mph, 178–208 km/h) Category 4 (130–156 mph, 209–251 km/h) Category 5 (≥157 mph, ≥252 km/h) Unknown Storm type Tropical cyclone Subtropical cyclone Extratropical cyclone, remnant low, tropical disturbance, or monsoon depression

A tropical disturbance developed northeast of Yap on July 7 and slowly increased in organization. The Joint Typhoon Warning Center (JTWC) issued a Tropical Cyclone Formation Alert on the disturbance later that day as it moved northwestward. By July 8, it had developed sufficient convection to be designated a tropical depression by the JTWC and the Japan Meteorological Agency (JMA). The depression continued to strengthen, and was designated Tropical Storm Bilis by the JMA early on July 9. The JTWC upgraded Bilis to tropical storm status later that day. On July 10, Bilis moved into the area of responsibility of the Philippine Atmospheric, Geophysical and Astronomical Services Administration (PAGASA), and was designated Tropical Storm Florita for local warnings.

Over the next several days, Bilis moved generally northwestward toward Taiwan, slowly strengthening over open waters. Bilis was designated a severe tropical storm by the JMA on July 11, but the storm did not strengthen much further over the next few days due to a marginal upper-air environment and dry air entrainment. PAGASA upgraded the system to typhoon status on July 12, but the JMA never officially recognized the system as such in its advisories. Bilis reached its official peak intensity of 60 knots (110 km/h; 69 mph) later that day.

Bilis made its first landfall in northern Taiwan on July 13, with an intensity of 55 kn (102 km/h; 63 mph). After moving across northern Taiwan, Bilis made its second landfall in Fujian, China early on July 14 at the same intensity, then weakened into a tropical depression over land the next day. Bilis lingered as a tropical depression over southeastern China before degenerating into a remnant low on July 16. But the JMA carried the system as a tropical depression until July 17. Despite becoming a remnant low, the remnants of Bilis maintained their identity for several days while moving westward over China, bringing heavy rains to inland areas.

== Preparations ==
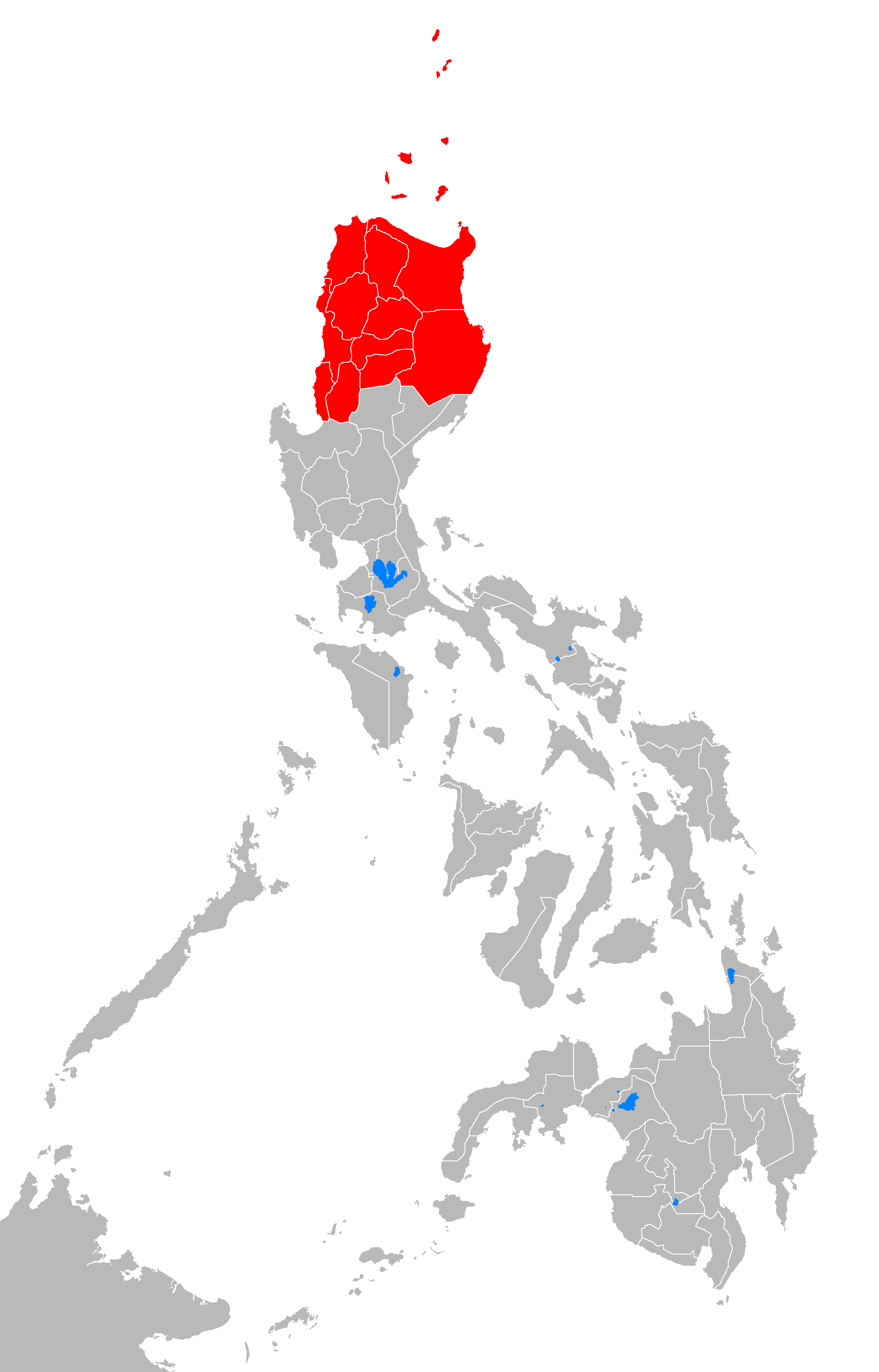
Provinces of the Philippines in which public storm signals were raised for Tropical Storm Florita

On July 13, PAGASA issued Storm Signal Number 3, a warning for winds of 100–185 km/h (62–115 mph), for the Batanes and Calayan Islands. Storm Signal Number 2, for winds of 60–100 km/h (37–62 mph), was issued for northern Luzon, including the rest of Cagayan, Ilocos Norte, and Apayao. Storm Signal Number 1 (30–60 km/h (19–37 mph) was raised for most of central Luzon, including much of the Cordillera Administrative Region and the northern half of the Ilocos Region. Schools and government offices in those regions were closed.

The provincial observatory of Fujian issued a typhoon warning for the province on July 11, well in advance of Bilis' final landfall. In response to the warning, officials evacuated over 800,000 people from Hunan and 70,000 from Zhejiang. In addition, 256,000 fishermen and workers were evacuated from coastal areas in southeastern China, and 220,000 ships were ordered to return to port. In Shanghai, the evacuations caused significant rail and bus delays, and more than 210 flights in and out of the city were canceled prior to landfall.

== Impact ==
=== Philippines ===
The strongest winds and heaviest rains were south and east of Bilis' center, and its outer rainbands swept across Luzon in the Philippines, causing heavy rains, wind gusts to tropical storm force, flash flooding, and landslides. Bilis was responsible for 45 million pesos in damage and at least 14 deaths, including three in Baguio, and six more in the Manila area.

=== Taiwan ===
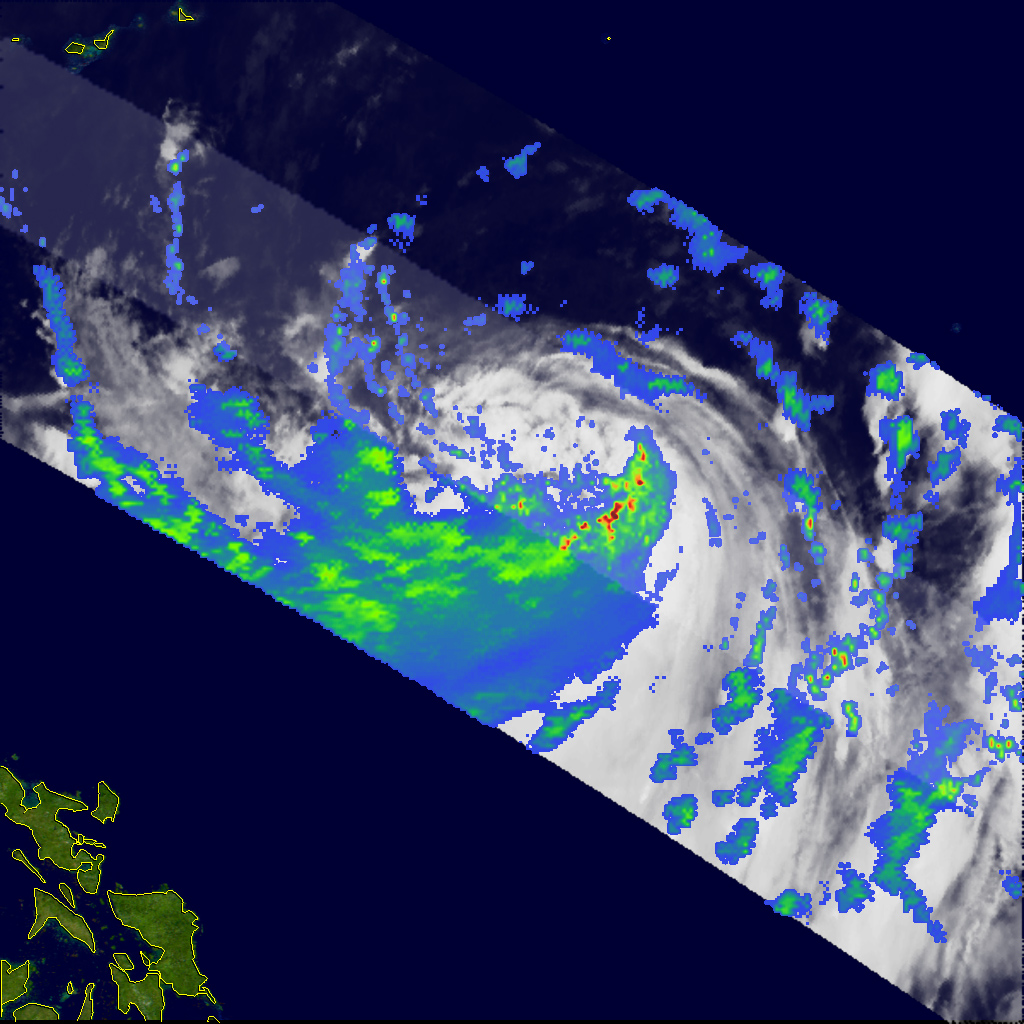
TRMM image of Bilis, showing its asymmetric rainfall distribution

Damage was light in Taiwan, due to Bilis' quick movement across the northern coast of the island. The Republic of China government reported four deaths, two of which were the deaths of fishermen from mainland China whose boat ran aground on Matsu Island. Another man was electrocuted in the city of Taipei as a result of the storm. The cause of the fourth death is unknown.

=== China ===
The storm made its second landfall in Fujian province, China, which was the province most impacted by the tropical cyclone. A total of 92 deaths and 3 billion Chinese yuan in damage were caused by the system, mostly from flooding. Schools and tourist attractions in the province were closed for several days. A total of 4,028,000 people were affected over an area of 17,597 square kilometres (6,794 mi^{2}), and the storm caused the evacuation of 519,000 people from the province.

Flooding killed 39 people in eastern Guangxi and 183 people in Guangdong. Eight more people were killed in Yunnan when a flash flood swept away some road workers' huts. A weather station in Guangdong reported a 5-hour rainfall total of 360.6 mm (14.2 inches). In Zhejiang, strong winds and heavy rain from Bilis caused 694 million yuan in damage, and a wind gust to 43 metres per second (150 km/h; 96 mph) was reported.

Several sections of the Beijing-Guangzhou railway, a main rail route in China, were blocked by flooding and landslides, causing many delays and diversions. One train was surrounded by floodwaters in Lechang, and passengers had to be evacuated to a nearby school. At least 274 trains were affected and the train company refunded nearly 2 million tickets. After three days of repair work, the rail service resumed normal operations on July 18.

Significant damage occurred in Hunan, where heavy flooding and mudslides destroyed over 31,000 homes and caused 526 deaths. Most of the damage and fatalities occurred in the village of Zixing, where local officials reported the flooding as the worst the area had seen in the past 100 years, and described the death toll as "unprecedented". In all, Bilis was responsible for 843 deaths, 208 people reported missing, and $4.4 billion (2006 USD) in damage to southeastern China.

== Aftermath ==
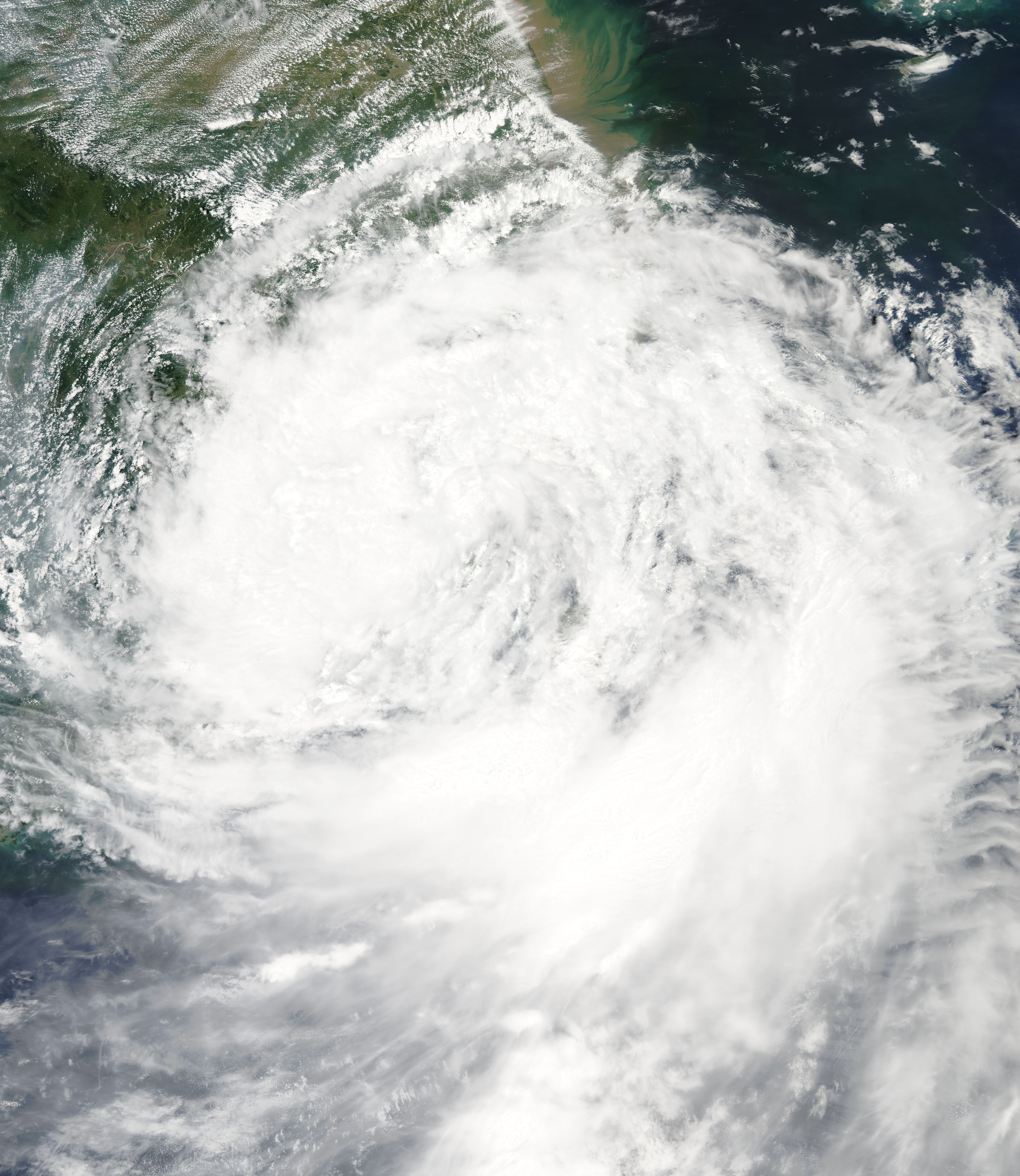
Severe Tropical Storm Bilis over eastern China on July 14

Bilis and its associated flooding left over 400,000 people homeless, and over 2 million more had to be evacuated in the face of rising waters. Following the storm, the Red Cross Society of China provided food, blankets, and water purification kits to over 100,000 Hunan residents in mass evacuation shelters. The relief effort was complicated by an earthquake in Yunnan, as well as three more tropical cyclones: Typhoon Kaemi, Typhoon Prapiroon, and Typhoon Saomai. All of the storms were stronger than Bilis, and exacerbated flooding and other problems in the region.

Because of the sudden large increase in the number of reported deaths in Hunan in a matter of hours, Chinese government officials accused local officials of covering up damage and casualty details. The Ministry of Civil Affairs sent a team to Hunan to investigate the allegations, and issued a notice stating that anyone found to be covering up any damage details would be held accountable.

The China Meteorological Administration released a press release after the storm and gave four reasons for the extensive damage. First, the storm decelerated after landfall and maintained its identity for 120 hours while moving south of due west. Secondly, the storm was asymmetric and rainfall concentrated in the southern semicircle. Also, the storm interacted with the active monsoon over the South China Sea, and the Hong Kong Observatory reported a 1-hour rainfall total of 115.1 mm (4.53 in), a new record. Finally, previous rainfall had made the area wetter than normal and more prone to flooding.

At the 39th annual meeting of the ESCAP/WMO Typhoon Committee in Manila in December 2006, the name Bilis was retired, along with four other names. In December 2007, the committee selected the name Maliksi to replace Bilis on the Western Pacific basin name lists beginning in 2008.

== See also ==
- Typhoon Rananim – Pacific typhoon in 2004
- Typhoon Fitow – Pacific typhoon in 2013
- Typhoon Matsa – Pacific typhoon in 2005
