= List of storms named Malakas =

The name Malakas (Tagalog: malakas, [mɐlɐˈkas]) was used for four tropical cyclones in the West Pacific Ocean. The name, contributed by the Philippines, means powerful or strong in Tagalog.

- Tropical Storm Malakas (2004) (T0414, 17W) – drifted out to sea
- Typhoon Malakas (2010) (T1012, 13W) – strong Category 2 typhoon that stayed out to sea
- Typhoon Malakas (2016) (T1616, 18W, Gener) – powerful Category 4 typhoon that impacted Taiwan and Japan.
- Typhoon Malakas (2022) (T2201, 02W, Basyang) – a large, early-season Category 3-equivalent typhoon that remained out to sea

Due to the pronunciation of Malakas being identical to that of a profane Greek slang word, the UK Met Office requested the name's retirement. Malakas was replaced with Amuyao (Tagalog: Amuyao, [ɐmujao]), which refers to Mount Amuyao on Luzon.

== See also ==
- Cyclone Mala (2006) – a North Indian Ocean tropical cyclone with a similar name
