= Typhoon Rananim =

Pacific typhoon in 2004

Typhoon Rananim (Karen)
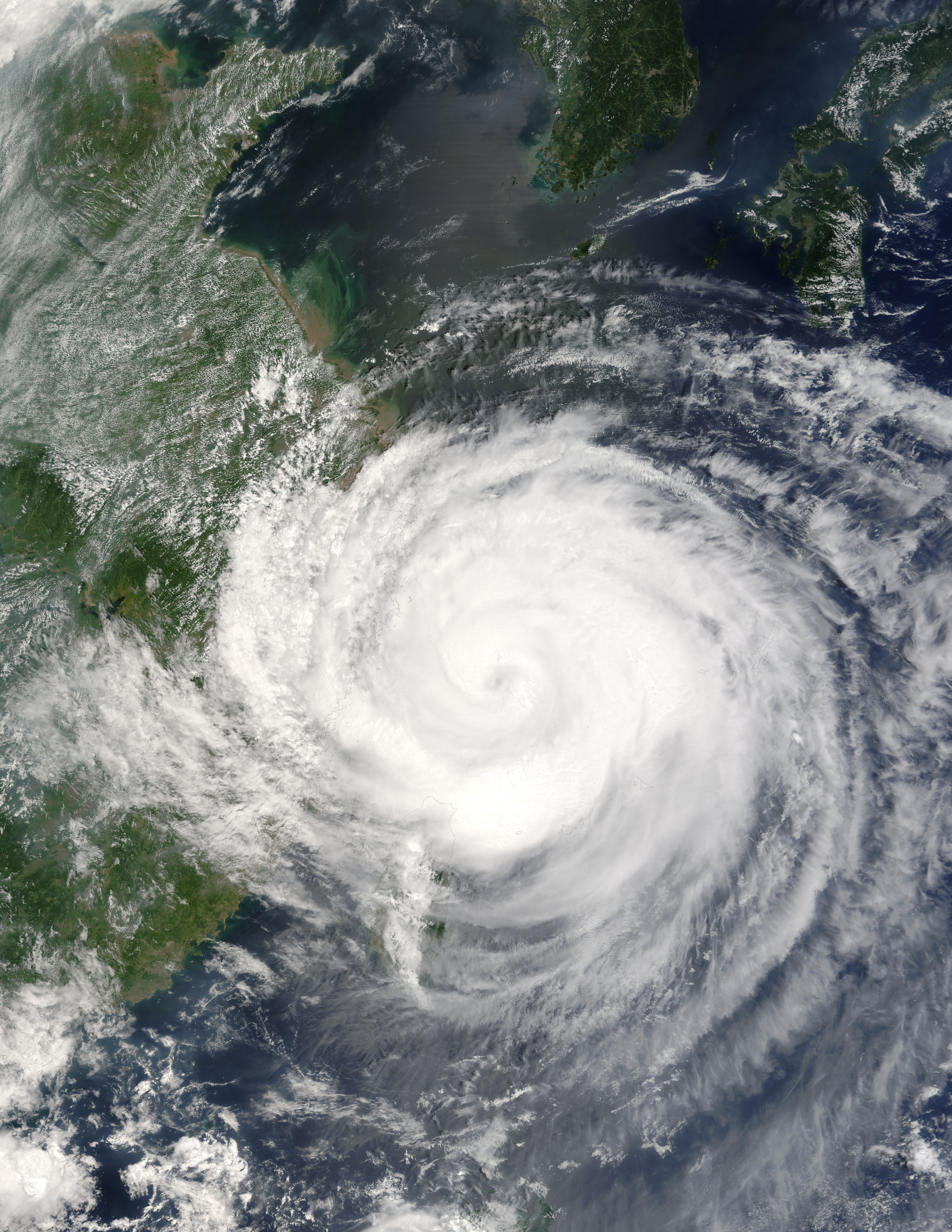
- Typhoon Rananim at peak intensity on August 12

Meteorological history
- Formed: August 6, 2004
- Dissipated: August 15, 2004

Typhoon
- 10-minute sustained (JMA)
- Highest winds: 150 km/h (90 mph)
- Lowest pressure: 950 hPa (mbar); 28.05 inHg

Category 2-equivalent typhoon
- 1-minute sustained (SSHWS/JTWC)
- Highest winds: 165 km/h (105 mph)
- Lowest pressure: 954 hPa (mbar); 28.17 inHg

Overall effects
- Fatalities: 169 total
- Damage: $2.44 billion (2004 USD)
- Areas affected: Taiwan, China, Japan
- IBTrACS
- Part of the 2004 Pacific typhoon season

Typhoon Rananim, (Note: The name Rananim (Chuukese: ráán ánnim, [ræːn̩ æn̩n̩im]) was contributed by the Federated States of Micronesia and means "hello, good day" in Chuukese.) known in the Philippines as Typhoon Karen, was the strongest typhoon to make landfall on the Chinese province of Zhejiang since Typhoon Wanda in 1956. It formed on August 6, 2004, intensifying into a tropical storm on August 8. Rananim gradually intensified, initially moving northward before turning to the northwest and attaining typhoon status. After developing a small eye, the typhoon attained peak winds of 150 km/h (93 mph) as it passed between Taiwan and Okinawa. On August 12, Rananim moved ashore in China, and it dissipated three days later.

Impact outside of China was minimal and largely limited to heavy rains, although one death was reported in Taiwan. In the country, strong winds and heavy rainfall left heavy damage near the coast, as well as to farms further inland. Rananim destroyed 64,300 houses and damaged another 125,000. The typhoon affected 75 counties, affecting 18 million people, and overall damage was estimated at ¥20.1 billion ($2.44 billion 2004 USD, $4.16 billion 2026 USD), primarily in Zhejiang. There were 168 deaths in China, which caused the name Rananim to be retired from the naming list.

== Meteorological history ==
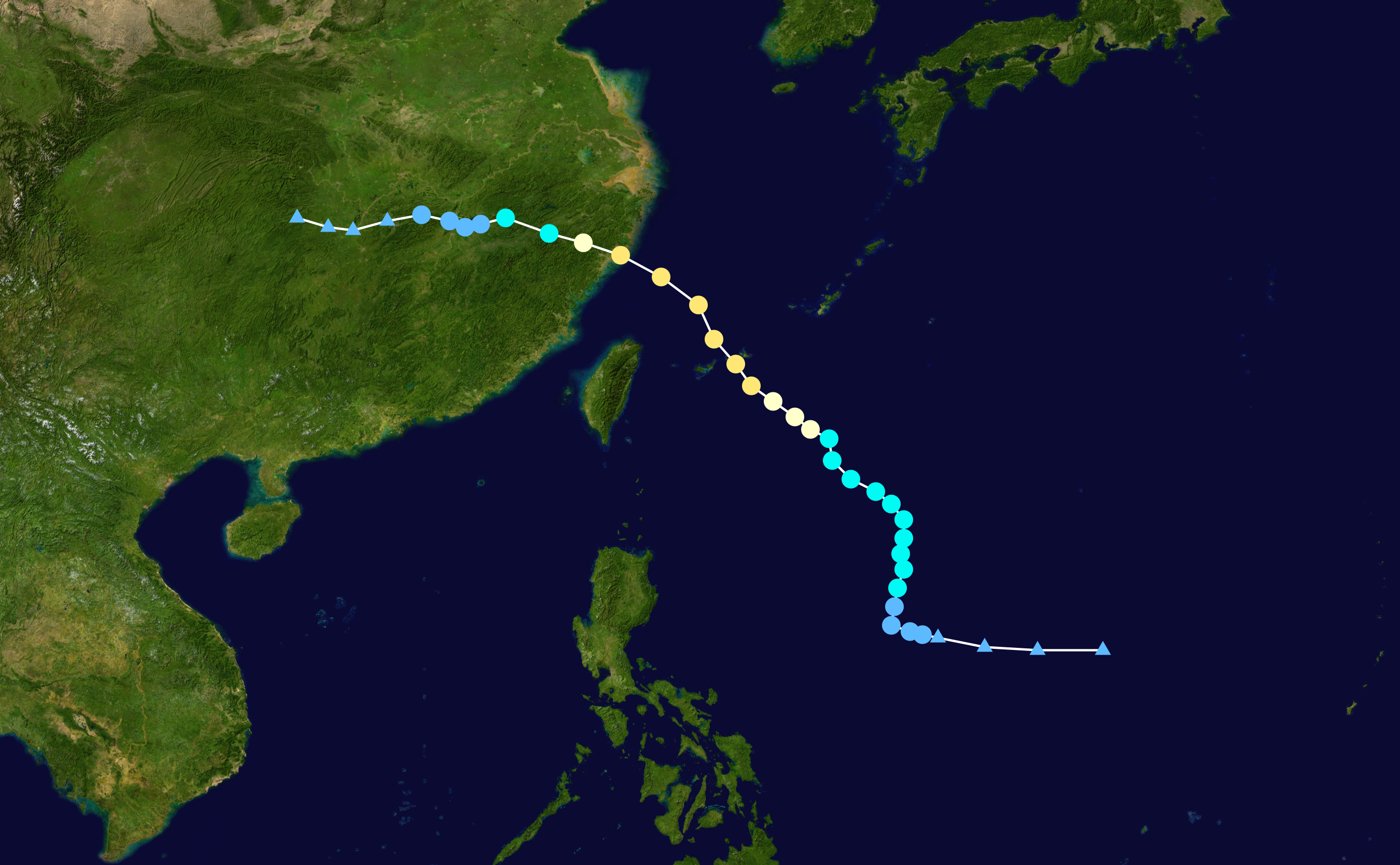
Map plotting the storm's track and intensity, according to the Saffir–Simpson scale Map key Saffir–Simpson scale Tropical depression (≤38 mph, ≤62 km/h) Tropical storm (39–73 mph, 63–118 km/h) Category 1 (74–95 mph, 119–153 km/h) Category 2 (96–110 mph, 154–177 km/h) Category 3 (111–129 mph, 178–208 km/h) Category 4 (130–156 mph, 209–251 km/h) Category 5 (≥157 mph, ≥252 km/h) Unknown Storm type Tropical cyclone Subtropical cyclone Extratropical cyclone, remnant low, tropical disturbance, or monsoon depression

The origins of Typhoon Rananim were from an area of convection that persisted west-northwest of Guam in early August. The system tracked generally westward in an area of moderate wind shear, maintaining a weak circulation center. On August 6, the Japan Meteorological Agency (JMA) estimated the system developed into a tropical depression. Shortly before that time, the Philippine Atmospheric, Geophysical and Astronomical Services Administration (PAGASA) initiated advisories on the system, giving it the name Karen.

Further convective organization occurred as the circulation consolidated, and the Joint Typhoon Warning Center (JTWC) issued a Tropical Cyclone Formation Alert late on August 6. The next day, the agency initiated advisories on Tropical Depression 16W about 780 km (480 mi) east of the Philippines island of Luzon. Subsequently, the depression maintained a northward track, due to its location along the northwest periphery of a near-equatorial ridge, as well as the presence of a tropical upper tropospheric trough. Although the circulation was broad, the winds intensified enough for the JMA to upgrade the depression to Tropical Storm Rananim on August 8.

Upon intensifying into a tropical storm, Rananim had a better-defined circulation than earlier in its duration; however, the convection was displaced from the center. The structure gradually organized, with increasing outflow and convective symmetry. On August 9, the storm turned toward the northwest due to a building ridge the northeast. At 0600 UTC on August 10, Rananim intensified into a typhoon about 715 km (444 mi) east-southeast of Taiwan. Steady strengthening continued, and the storm passed about 365 km (227 mi) southwest of Okinawa early on August 11. Shortly thereafter, Rananim left the PAGASA area of warning responsibility. A small eye became evident on satellite imagery, and late on August 11 the JMA estimated the typhoon attained peak winds of 150 km/h (93 mph). The JTWC, however, assessed Rananim as intensifying slightly more despite decreased outflow, reaching peak winds of 165 km/h (103 mph).

After passing north of Taiwan, Rananim made landfall at peak intensity around 1300 UTC on August 12, near Wenling in Zhejiang province in China. The China Meteorological Administration reported that the typhoon was the strongest to hit Zhejiang since Typhoon Sally in 1956. Moving over land, the typhoon quickly weakened to tropical storm status as it turned toward the west. Early on August 13, the JMA downgraded Rananim to a tropical depression and issued the last warning; by that time, the circulation was over Jiangxi. The depression lasted another two days before dissipating over northwest Hunan.

== Preparations and impact ==
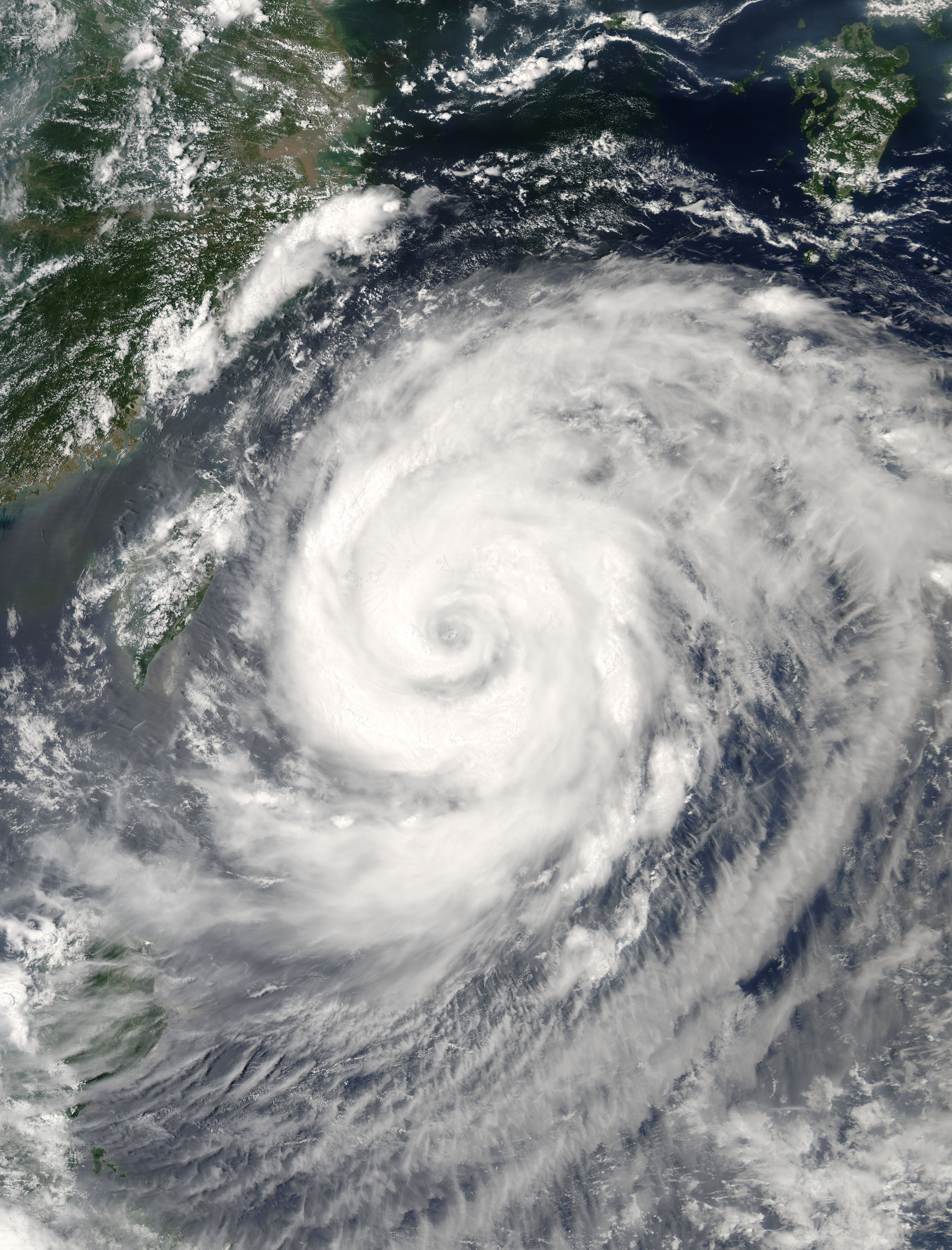
Typhoon Rananim east of Taiwan on August 11

After receiving heavy damage from Typhoon Mindulle a month earlier, residents in Taiwan prepared for Rananim by erecting sandbags along flood prone areas, while the Central Weather Bureau advised mariners to be on alert due to the storm. As it passed to the north of the country, the typhoon dropped moderate rainfall, reaching 345 mm (13.6 in) in Hsinchu. There was one death on the island. Around the same time as affecting Taiwan, Rananim passed southwest of Okinawa, producing wind gusts up to 176 km/h (109 mph), as well as heavy rainfall totaling 229 mm (9.0 in) on Miyako-jima.

Prior to the typhoon's arrival in China, officials evacuated 467,900 people, many of them to government shelters across the region. It was estimated that about 30% of coastal houses were too weak to withstand the winds from the typhoon. In addition, officials ordered the closure of all restaurants and entertainment venues. Ferry service near Shanghai was disrupted, and 9,900 ships were moved to safer areas. In addition, several airports across the region were closed, including in Shanghai.

As it moved ashore in Zhejiang, Rananim produced widespread rainfall across the country, primarily along its path. 20 stations reported totals of over 300 mm (12 in), including Yueqing where rainfall reached 703.5 mm (27.70 in) in 24 hours, setting a new record. Rananim also produced strong winds as it moved through the region, with a record-breaking gust of 211 km/h (131 mph) reported in the offshore Dachen Islands. Wenling City, where the typhoon moved ashore, reported a peak gust of 192 km/h (119 mph). High waves were also observed as Rananim made landfall, and a storm tide of 7.42 m (24.3 ft) in Haimen.

Upon moving ashore, Rananim destroyed hundreds of homes near the coast, with destroyed traffic signs and billboards, as well as widespread flooding. Strong winds caused widespread power outages and uprooted thousands of trees. About 64,300 houses were destroyed, and another 125,000 were damaged, leaving thousands of people homeless. Overall, the typhoon affected 75 counties, with 302 villages isolated due to high water. The combination of strong winds and flooding left heavy crop damage, killing 55,000 livestock, primarily cattle, and affecting 4,000 km^{2} (1,500 sq mi) of fields; an estimated 230 km^{2} (89 sq mi) of crops were destroyed. The typhoon severely impacted the infrastructure along its path, with 1,163 km (723 mi) of roads damaged. Further inland, the rains produced a landslide in Yueqing, which destroyed 52 houses and killed 25 people. In Shanghai, about 145 km (90 mi) north of the landfall location, Rananim left little damage, although its rainfall alleviated a heat wave. Across the country, damage was estimated at ¥20.1 billion ($2.44 billion 2004 USD$, 4.16 billion 2026 USD), primarily in Zhejiang.

Overall, Rananim affected about 18 million people in China. A total of 3,321 people were injured, 185 of them seriously. By the day after Rananim moved ashore, the death toll was estimated at 29, although by the next day the total reached 115. Four days after landfall, there were 147 known deaths, which increased to 164 the following day. The final death toll was set at 168, although 24 people were missing as of the last count. Most of the deaths were from collapsed houses, with others due to flooding, landslides, or flying debris.

== Aftermath ==
Immediately after Rananim dissipated, the government of China allocated ¥61 million ($7.4 million 2004 USD) for the affected people. Officials deployed over 200 members of the People's Liberation Army to assist in rescues. They used steel bars, ropes, and their hands to search through rubble for storm survivors. At the same time, utility crews worked to restore power and water in the affected areas. A few weeks after the typhoon, an earthquake and another typhoon struck the same region as Rananim had, creating additional flooding, damage, and deaths. The series of natural disasters stretched the resources of the local agencies, although the local Red Cross was still able to provide food, clothing, and blankets. The agency also launched appeals for additional relief supplies. The affected storm victims collectively received 50 tons of rice, 500 kg (1,100 lb) of pork, and 500 kg (1,100 lb) of salt, vegetables, and water. A damaged school in Yueqing required additional buildings to be built for classes to resume by September. An estimated 85% of the destroyed homes were built before or during the 1980s, compared to 10% built in the 1990s. As a result, the government rebuilt homes across the affected area to higher building standards in order to mitigate future losses from typhoons.

== Retirement ==
Due to the heavy damage in China, the name Rananim was retired during the 38th session of the Economic and Social Commission for Asia and the Pacific and World Meteorological Organization typhoon committee in November 2005; it was replaced with the name Fanapi. Rananim was the eighth Pacific name to be retired.

== See also ==
- Other tropical cyclones named Karen
- Typhoon Saomai
- Typhoon Fitow
- Typhoon Matsa
