= Typhoon Saomai =

Pacific typhoon in 2006

Typhoon Saomai (Juan)
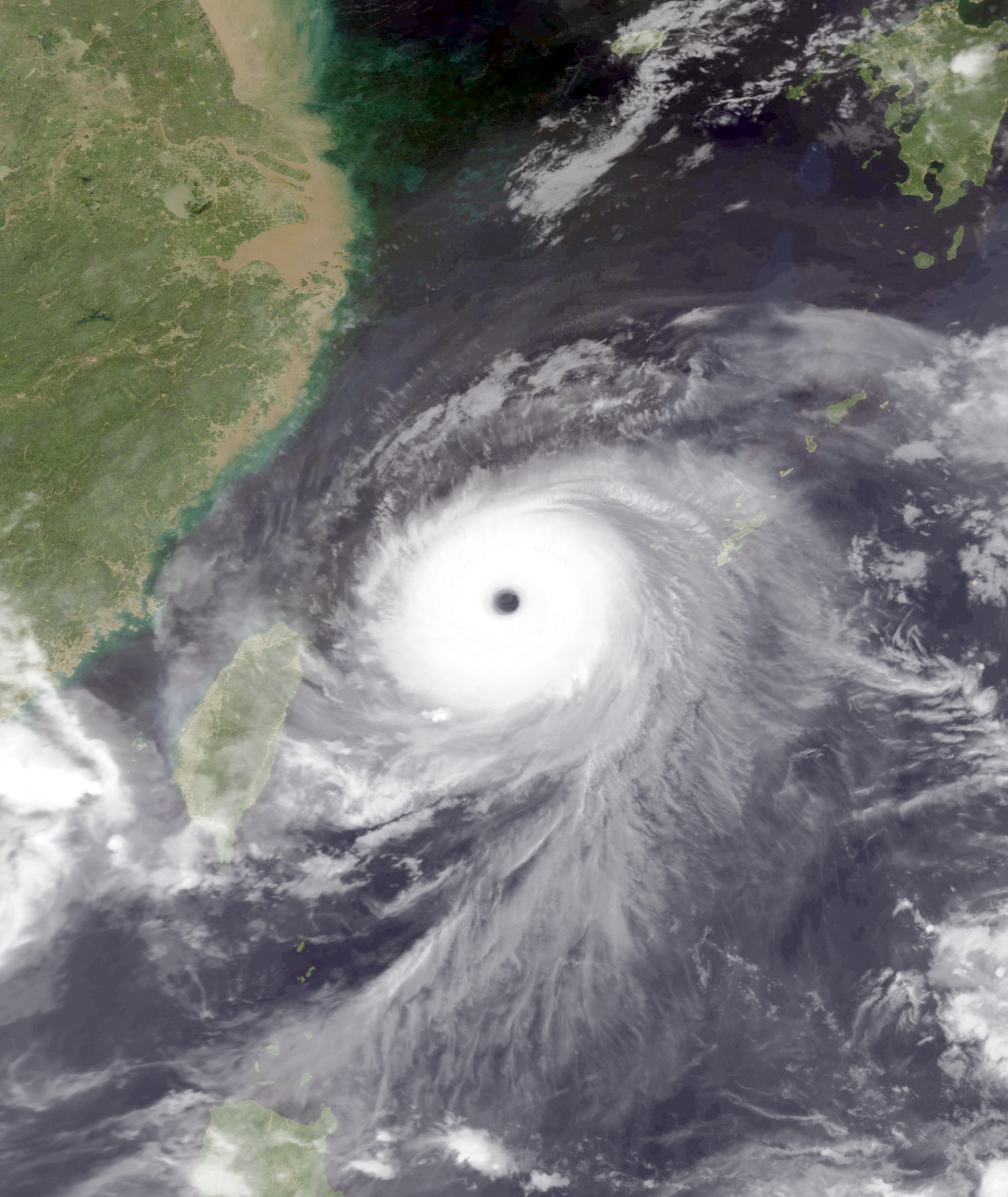
- Typhoon Saomai at peak intensity on August 9

Meteorological history
- Formed: August 4, 2006
- Dissipated: August 12, 2006

Violent typhoon
- 10-minute sustained (JMA)
- Highest winds: 195 km/h (120 mph)
- Lowest pressure: 925 hPa (mbar); 27.32 inHg

Category 5-equivalent super typhoon
- 1-minute sustained (SSHWS/JTWC)
- Highest winds: 260 km/h (160 mph)
- Lowest pressure: 898 hPa (mbar); 26.52 inHg

Overall effects
- Fatalities: 456 total
- Damage: $2.5 billion (2006 USD)
- Areas affected: Mariana Islands, Taiwan, China
- IBTrACS /
- Part of the 2006 Pacific typhoon season

Typhoon Saomai, (Note: The name Saomai (Vietnamese: sao Mai, [saːw˧˧ maːj˧˧]) was contributed by Vietnam and means Venus in Vietnamese.) known in the Philippines as Typhoon Juan was considered the most powerful typhoon on record to strike the East coast of the People's Republic of China. It was the eighth tropical storm, fifth typhoon, and third super typhoon of the 2006 Pacific typhoon season recognized by the Joint Typhoon Warning Center. According to the Japan Meteorological Agency, Saomai was the seventh tropical storm and fifth typhoon of the season. PAGASA also gave the local name Juan to the typhoon.

The typhoon brought heavy rain and wind to areas of the Mariana Islands, the Philippines, Taiwan, and the east coast of China during early August. It was responsible for 456 deaths and $2.5 billion (2006 USD) in damage. Saomai affected many of the same areas affected by Tropical Storm Bilis a month earlier, and the China Meteorological Administration reported that Saomai was the strongest typhoon that ever occurred over China's offshore region as well as the most powerful typhoon ever to make landfall over mainland China.

== Meteorological history ==
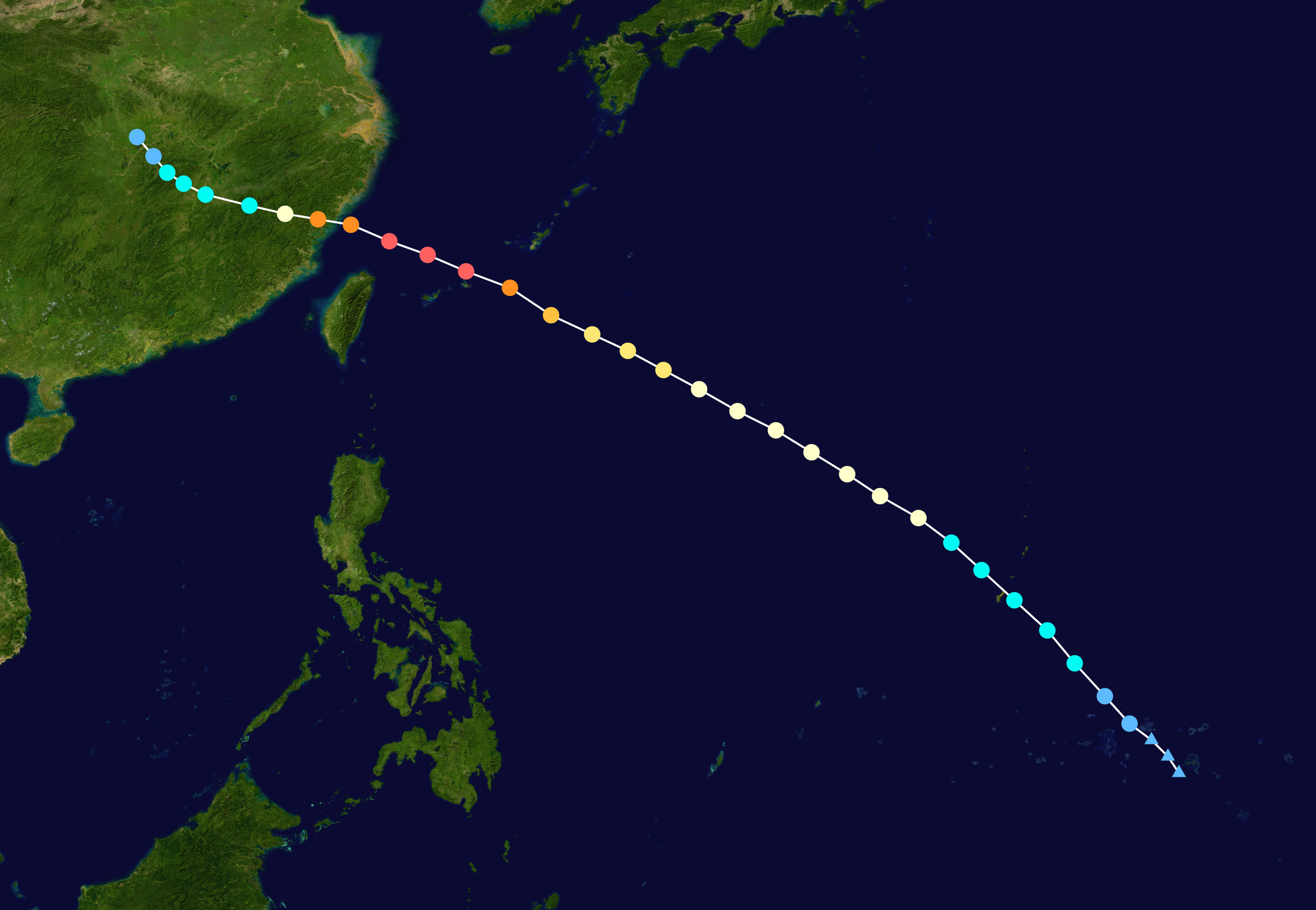
Map plotting the storm's track and intensity, according to the Saffir–Simpson scale Map key Saffir–Simpson scale Tropical depression (≤38 mph, ≤62 km/h) Tropical storm (39–73 mph, 63–118 km/h) Category 1 (74–95 mph, 119–153 km/h) Category 2 (96–110 mph, 154–177 km/h) Category 3 (111–129 mph, 178–208 km/h) Category 4 (130–156 mph, 209–251 km/h) Category 5 (≥157 mph, ≥252 km/h) Unknown Storm type Tropical cyclone Subtropical cyclone Extratropical cyclone, remnant low, tropical disturbance, or monsoon depression

A tropical disturbance formed east of Chuuk on July 31 and gradually increased in organization over the next several days as it moved northwestward. The Joint Typhoon Warning Center (JTWC) issued a Tropical Cyclone Formation Alert on the system on August 4 and it was designated a tropical depression by both the JTWC and the Japan Meteorological Agency (JMA) later that day. The depression strengthened into a tropical storm on August 5, and the JMA designated it Tropical Storm Saomai.

Saomai continued moving toward the northwest and passed over the Mariana Islands on August 6 while continuing to strengthen, and was upgraded to a severe tropical storm by the JMA later that day. The storm then began organizing and intensifying more rapidly, becoming a typhoon early on August 7. Saomai moved into the area of responsibility of PAGASA on August 8, and was designated Typhoon Juan. Due to Saomai's proximity to Tropical Storm Bopha, located near Taiwan, the two underwent a Fujiwhara interaction. This interaction served to shift Saomai's track slightly to the south and provided the system with an influx of moisture via southwesterly monsoonal flow on the backside of Bopha.

Late on August 9, Saomai reached its peak intensity as it moved just north of Miyakojima. The JMA estimated it to have attained winds of 195 km/h (120 mph) and a central pressure of 925 mbar (hPa; 27.32 inHg). The JTWC estimated Saomai to have been a much more powerful system, ranking it as a Category 5-equivalent super typhoon with one-minute winds of 260 km/h (160 mph) and a pressure of 26.52 inHg). Further, though less significant, discrepancies on the peak intensity of Saomai exist between the local warning centers for China. Both the China Meteorological Administration (CMA) and Hong Kong Observatory (HKO) estimated the typhoon to have been slightly stronger, stating peak ten-minute sustained winds of 215 and 210 km/h (134 and 130 mph), respectively. Similarly the agencies reported lower pressures: 915 mbar (hPa; 27.02 inHg) by the CMA and 920 hPa (27.17 inHg) by the HKO.

After passing to the south of Okinawa, Saomai turned westward and brushed the northern coast of Taiwan Island early on August 10. The typhoon maintained its minimum pressure until it approached within 80 km (50 mi) of the eastern China coast. On August 10, Typhoon Saomai made landfall at Cangnan County in southern Zhejiang, still maintaining a small and clear eye. According to the CMA, the typhoon moved ashore with maximum sustained winds of 216 km/h (134 mph), and a central pressure of 920 mbar (27 inHg). By winds, Saomai tied Typhoon Marge in 1973 for the strongest typhoon to strike mainland China; because Saomai had a lower landfall pressure than Marge, the CMA considered it the strongest typhoon on record to strike the nation, as well as a 1 in 100 year typhoon. Saomai was therefore the strongest typhoon to strike Zhejiang, surpassing the previous record held by typhoons Rananim in 2004 and Typhoon Khanun in 2005. However, wind estimates for typhoons could be inaccurate for early typhoons. Gradual weakening ensued as Saomai moved further inland, and it weakened into a tropical depression on August 11, dissipating later that day.

== Preparations ==
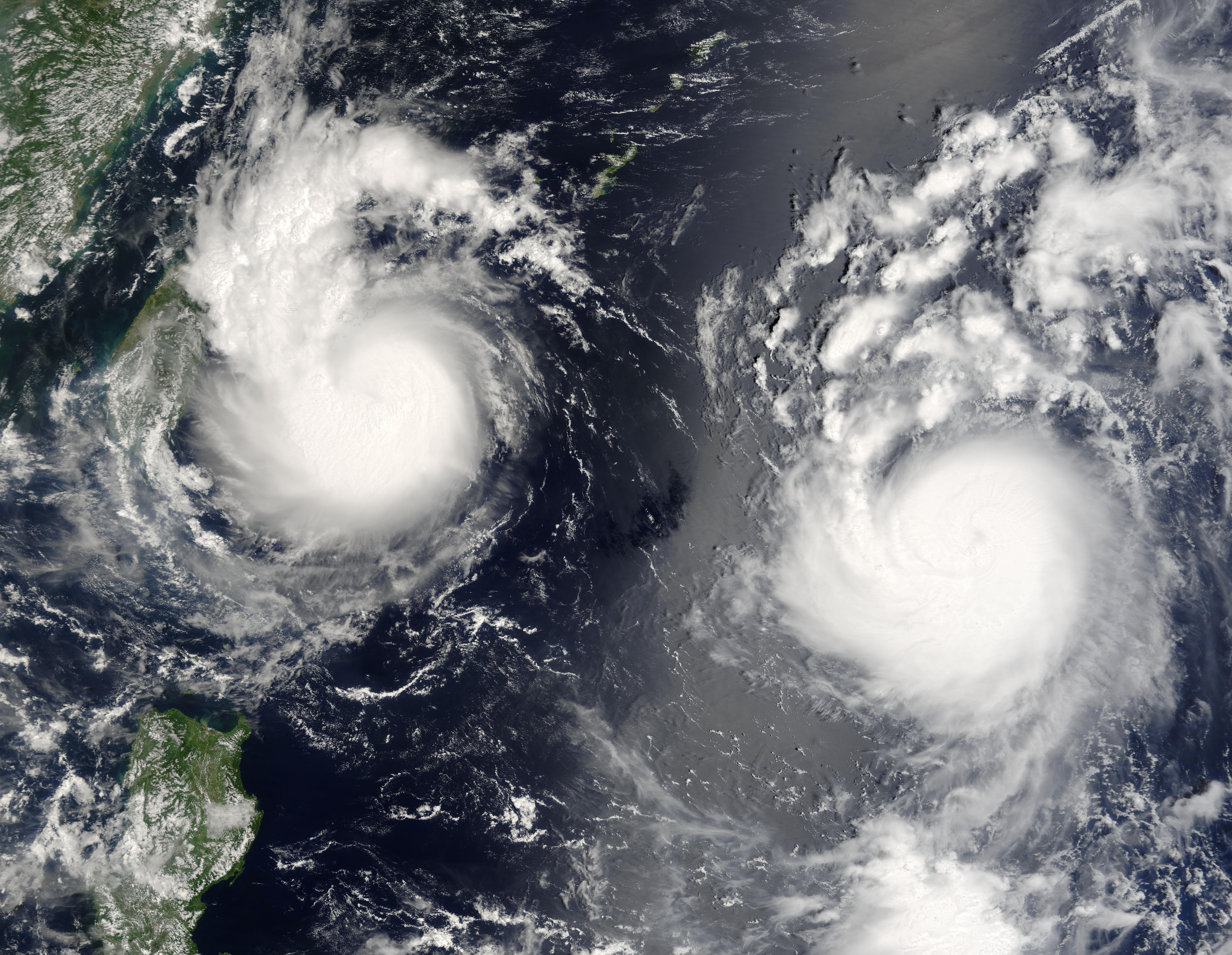
Tropical Storm Bopha (left) and Typhoon Saomai (right) on August 9

The United States National Weather Service issued a tropical storm warning for Guam as Tropical Storm Saomai approached the island on August 6. Military bases in northern Guam entered Tropical Cyclone Condition of Readiness 1, meaning that winds of 50 knots or higher were expected within 12 hours. The rest of the island was placed under Condition of Readiness 2, meaning that such winds were possible within 24 hours. Several bases were temporarily closed.

The Central Weather Bureau of the Republic of China issued land and marine typhoon warnings for areas of northern Taiwan in anticipation of Saomai's outer bands. The warnings had been upgraded from lesser warnings issued for Tropical Storm Bopha, which made landfall in southern Taiwan the day before. Five flights in and around Taiwan were canceled, as was ferry service. Hundreds of flights from Okinawa to the rest of Japan were also canceled.

In China, 1,001,000 people in Zhejiang and 710,000 people in Fujian were evacuated to shelters prior to Saomai's landfall. Over 20,000 soldiers and police were mobilized to aid in cleanup and rescue efforts. Officials ordered 10,286 ships with 35,282 fishermen to return to port in Fujian, while another 5,638 ships returned to port in Zhejiang. Also in Fujian, all 26,800 schools were closed. The Wenzhou city government ordered all businesses to close and prepare for the storm. Airlines canceled 25 flights from Fuzhou Changle International Airport and another 17 from Hong Kong, while ferry service was also disrupted. During the storm, the Wenzhou Longwan International Airport closed, stranding hundreds of travelers.

== Impact ==
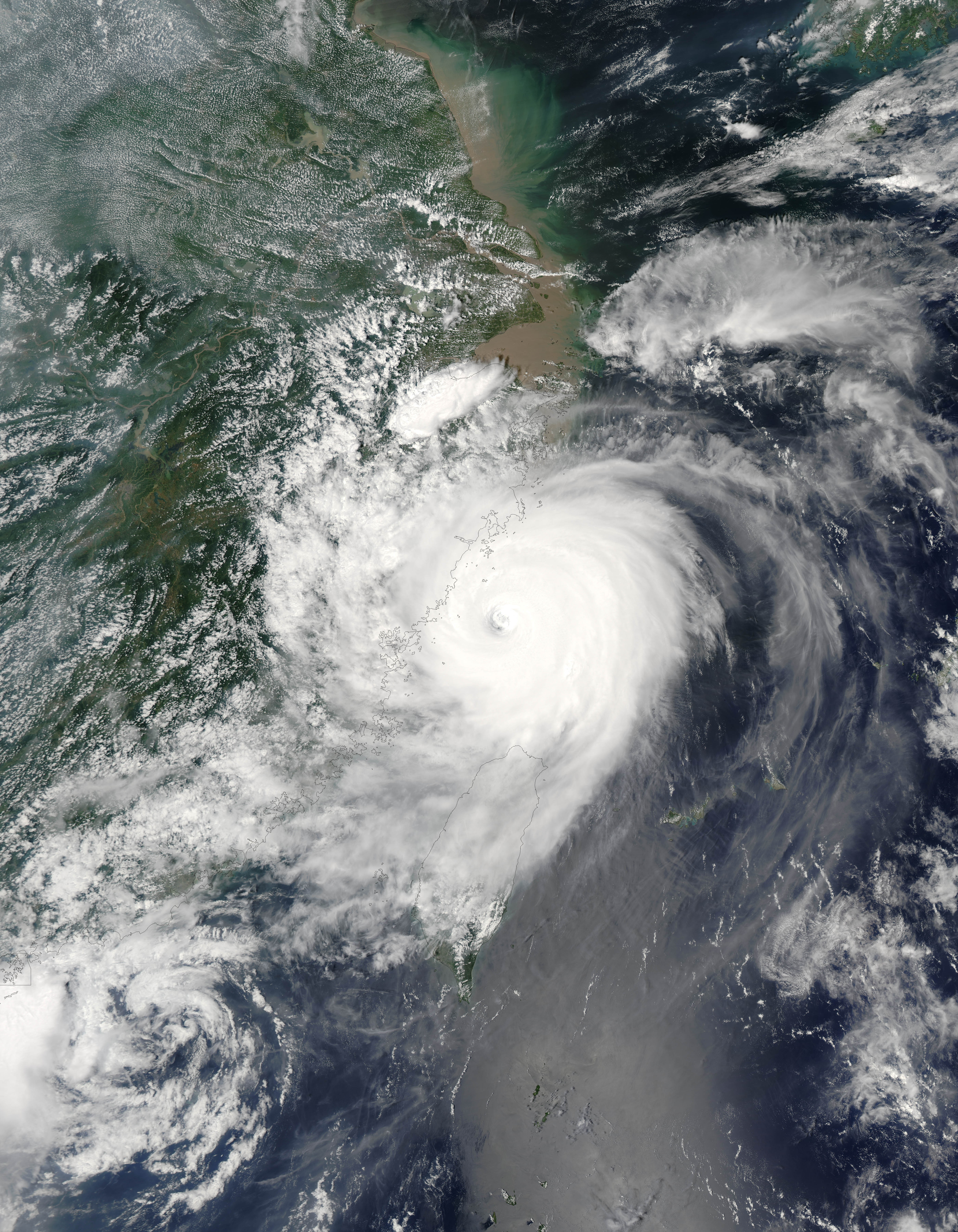
Typhoon Saomai nearing East China on August 9

During the overnight hours of August 5–6, Tropical Storm Saomai moved through the southern Mariana Islands with its center passing halfway between Guam and Rota. Owing to the storm's relatively quick pace, its effects were limited in duration. Rota received the strongest winds, with gusts peaking at 88 km/h (55 mph) at the International Airport while sustained values reached 55 km/h (34 mph). Lesser winds occurred on Guam, with a peak gust of 61 km/h (38 mph) measured at Andersen Air Force Base. Enhanced winds extended northward to Tinian and Saipan. Light to moderate rains accompanied the storm and accumulations were generally less than 76 mm (3.0 in); however, monsoonal flow along the south side of Saomai enhanced totals over Guam where 113.5 mm (4.47 in) fell. Only minor damage resulted from the storm's passage, limited to downed trees and power lines on Guam. Brief electrical outages occurred in Barrigada and Chalan Pago. Overall, damage in the region was estimated at $5,000.

Later, as with Tropical Storm Bilis a month earlier, Saomai's outer rainbands affected areas of the Philippines. Over 400 homes were destroyed by storm surge, and two people were killed. At least seven people were reported missing.

The core of the typhoon passed to the north of Taiwan, but the island still experienced heavy rain and wind that disrupted traffic and cancelled flights to and from Taipei. No serious damage or casualties were reported.

While in the vicinity of Okinawa, Saomai brushed the southern Ryukyu Islands. Miyakojima reported the heaviest rainfall in Japan, totaling 52 mm (2.0 in). Wind gusts in the region peaked at 72 km/h (45 mph) at Shimoji-shima. Waves of 10 m (33 ft) in height were reported at Miyakojima, which caused ¥980,000 (JPY, $8,500 USD) in road damage. (Note: The total was originally reported in Japanese yen. Total converted via the Oanda Corporation website.)

=== Mainland China ===
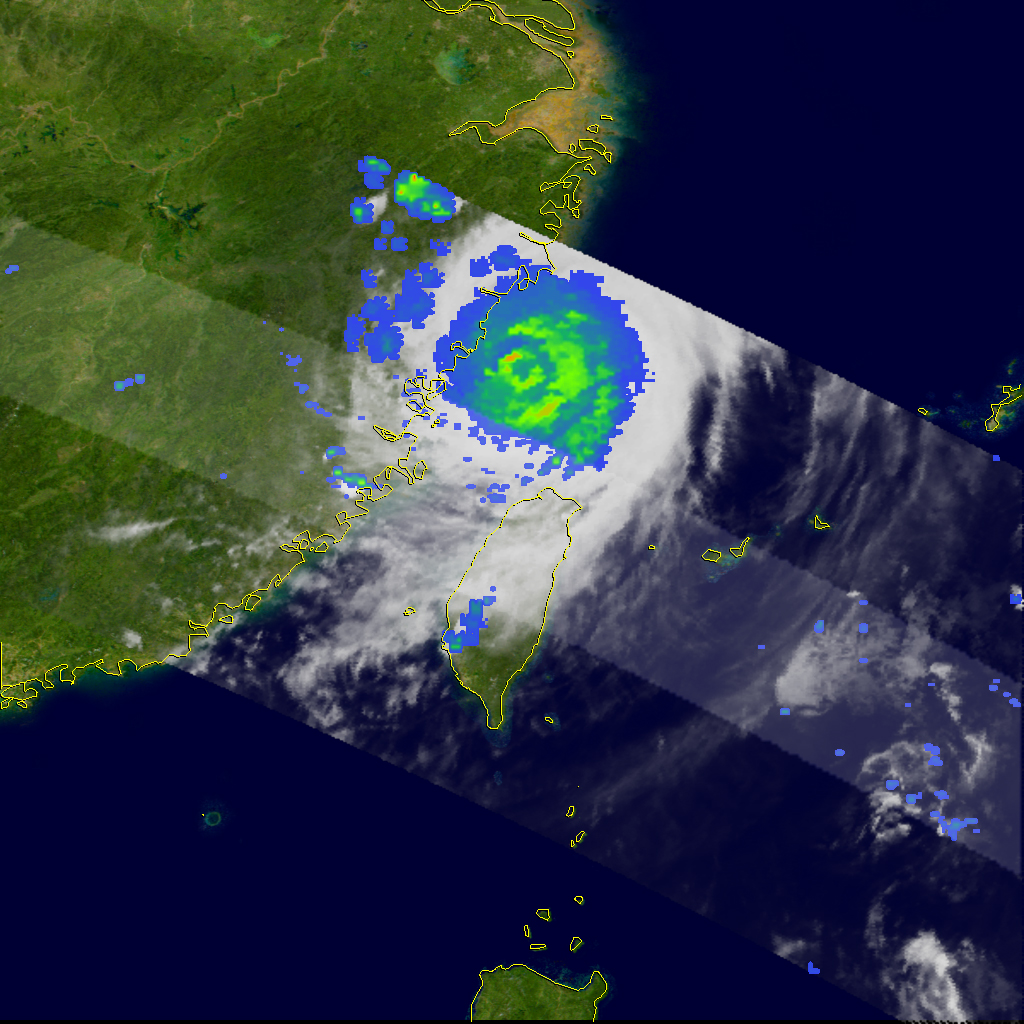
TRMM satellite image showing rainfall distribution within Typhoon Saomai at landfall.

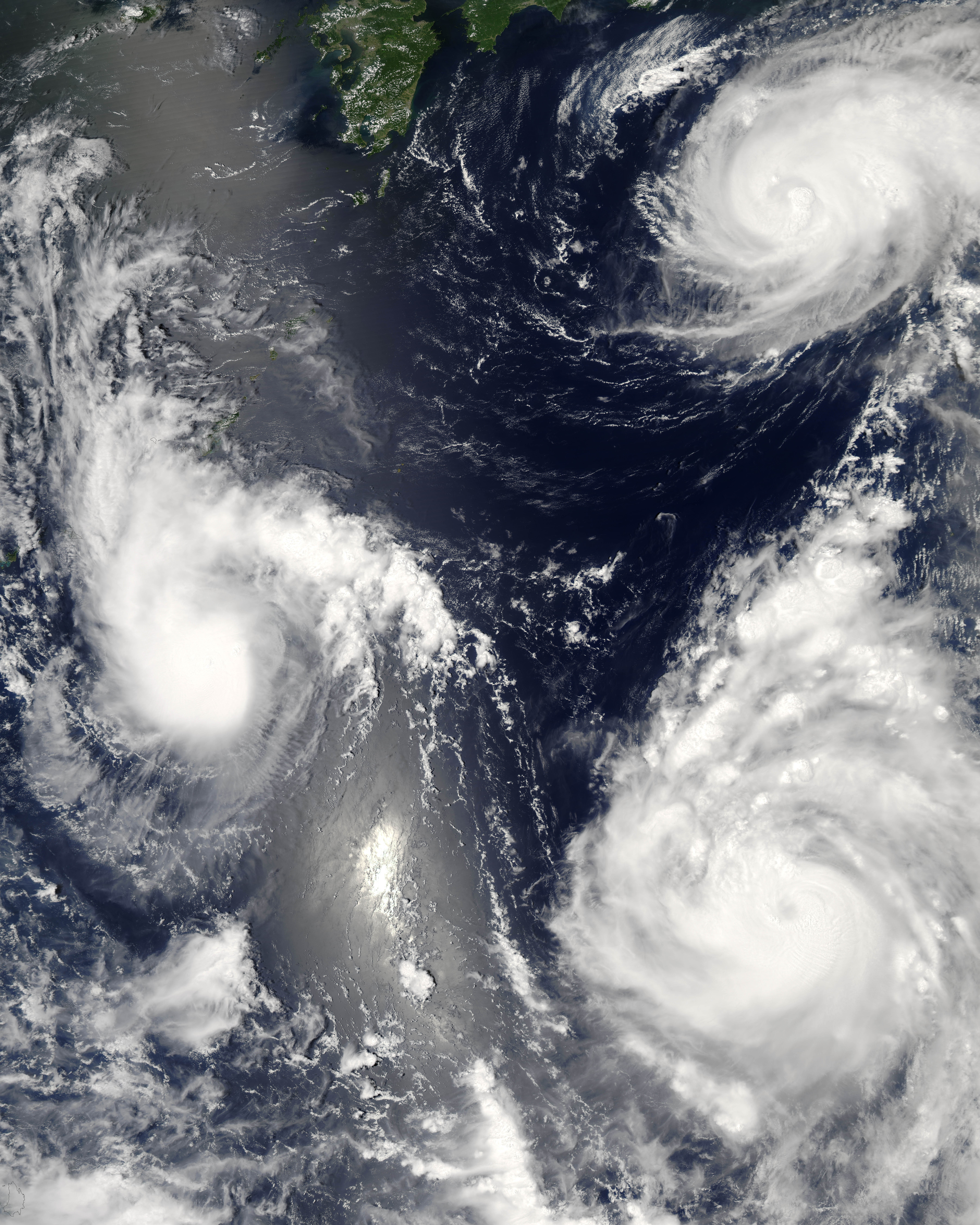
Three tropical cyclones of the 2006 Pacific typhoon season

Saomai was the third in a series of deadly storms that struck China in the summer of 2006, after Tropical Storm Bilis in July killed over 600 people and Typhoon Prapiroon killed around 80 people in early August. It was also the sixth tropical cyclone of the year to strike the country. While moving ashore in Zhejiang province, Saomai produced high waves, gusty winds, and heavy rainfall. Cangnan County in Wenzhou reported 30 mm (1.2 in) of precipitation in only one hour, and 300 mm (12 in) over 12 hours. Rainfall reached 200 mm (7.9 in) in the inland province of Jiangxi, with 105 mm (4.1 in) recorded in one hour in Linchuan District. The storm broke several wind records in eastern China. A station in Cangnan County reported peak winds of 245 km/h (152 mph), and a station in Fuding reported winds of 273 km/h (170 mph), which were the strongest winds on record in Zhejiang and Fujian, respectively. The latter value was slightly less than the 284 km/h (176 mph) wind report in Hong Kong during Typhoon Wanda in 1962. Fuding city reported gusts of over 144 km/h (89 mph) for about three hours, and widespread areas in Zhejiang and Fujian reported typhoon force winds, with a 45 km (28 mi) diameter of 216 km/h (134 mph) winds.

Along its path, Saomai destroyed about 54,000 buildings while causing widespread power outages. There were 61,277 destroyed rooms and another 371,147 that were damaged, mostly in Fujian. Most of the damaged houses along the path were generally masonry built, while newer towers fared better due to higher building standards. The typhoon also damaged 244,900 hectares (605,000 acres) of farmlands, mostly in Jiangxi. Saomai struck a less developed area of China, which limited insured damage to around ¥400–500 million (RMB, $50.5–63 million USD). This was estimated to have been between 4–9% of the overall damage. Damage was estimated at ¥11.66 billion (RMB, $1.5 billion). Overall, Saomai killed at least 441 people, although unofficial sources suggest a death toll of around 1,000.

The storm left nearly all of Zhejiang without power and cut half of all communication links. The heavy damage prompted officials to declare a state of emergency. In Wenzhou alone, over 18,000 homes were destroyed, and 3,850 factories were forced to shut down. Also in Wenzhou, Saomai left over 213,000 people without clean water. 193 people died in the city. In Cangnan County, the typhoon damaged 450 schools, totaling ¥25 million (RMB, US$3.1 million). Rainfall across the state flooded 56 provincial roads and highways. Six people died in Lishui after being crushed by a landslide. Throughout Zhejiang, economic losses totaled ¥4.9 billion (RMB, $610 million), of which ¥4.5 billion (RMB, $560 million) was in Wenzhou.

In Fujian, high waves in Fuding wrecked about 1,000 ships, killing hundreds of fishermen. Most of the lost ships were in the village of Shacheng, where about half of the residents were left homeless. Some entire villages in Fujian were entirely swept away by the winds and rains. High winds and rainfall destroyed 32,700 houses, including 10,000 in Fuding alone; there were also 80,000 damaged houses in the city. Economic losses reached ¥3.1 billion (RMB, US$388 million), and about 200 people died in Fuding. Also in the city, Saomai destroyed the roof tiles and the gate house of the 1,146 year old Ziguo temple, a local historical site. The monks in the temple had evacuated, and damage to the structure was estimated ¥5 million (RMB, US$625,000), rendering it largely destroyed. Damage in Fuzhou, also in Fujian, totaled ¥200 million (RMB, US$25 million). Province-wide, 234 factories or mines were forced to shut down due to the typhoon. Economic losses in Fujian totaled ¥6.4 billion (RMB, US$795 million).

About a month after Typhoon Kaemi affected the region, Saomai caused additional flooding in the inland province of Jiangxi. There, the storm wrecked six reservoirs, resulting in ¥348 million (RMB, US$45 million) in damage. About 35,000 people were forced to evacuate in Jiangxi due to the storm. One person was washed away in floodwaters while inspecting damage, while another person was killed when a damaged building collapsed. In neighboring Anhui province, flooding forced residents to evacuate homes.

87 deaths were reported in Zhejiang, mostly in Wenzhou. Major highways in the province were flooded out. Most of these deaths were caused by storm surge flooding in coastal fishing communities, such as Fuding. Eight of the deaths were caused by the collapse of a damaged evacuation shelter. Strong winds and flooding destroyed 37,000 houses and flooded 380 km^{2} (94,000 acres) of farmland, and economic damage amounted to 6.3 billion yuan.

== Aftermath ==
Immediately after Saomai made landfall in China, local Red Cross chapters provided residents left homeless with emergency supplies, such as blankets, clothing, medicine, and disinfectant. After the storm moved ashore, the Wenzhou government blocked street access to the areas with the heaviest damage. Officials ordered stores to cease selling items that were unrelated to storm recovery. By 11 days after landfall, 80% of the factories in Wenzhou had reopened. The city of Fuding provided ¥104.9 million (RMB, US$13.2 million) toward reconstructing, as well as ¥5,000 (RMB, US$625) for each family.

The International Federation of Red Cross and Red Crescent Societies made an appeal for almost 6 million Swiss francs ($4.8 million, 2006 USD) to assist stricken families in the PRC. As of August 11, 2006, about 1.8 million Chinese yuan ($220,000) worth of relief items and financial assistance had been given to the victims. The PRC government also allocated 120 million yuan ($15.2 million) for disaster relief in areas affected by Saomai and earlier storms. The funds were used to provide food and water for displaced victims and pay for the rebuilding effort in Zhejiang and Fujian.

=== Retirement ===
After the season ended, members of the 39th meeting of the Typhoon Committee of the World Meteorological Organization met in Manila in December 2006. They discussed retiring the name "Saomai", along with four other names from the season. During the 40th meeting in November 2007, the Typhoon Committee approved the retirement, announcing that the name "Son-Tinh" would replace Saomai on the basin name lists beginning in 2008 and was first used in the 2012 season.

== See also ==
- Typhoon Rananim
- Typhoon Chan-hom (2015)
- Typhoon Abe (1990)
- Typhoon Maria (2018)
- Typhoon Doksuri
