= Typhoon Fitow =

Pacific typhoon in 2013

Typhoon Fitow (Quedan)
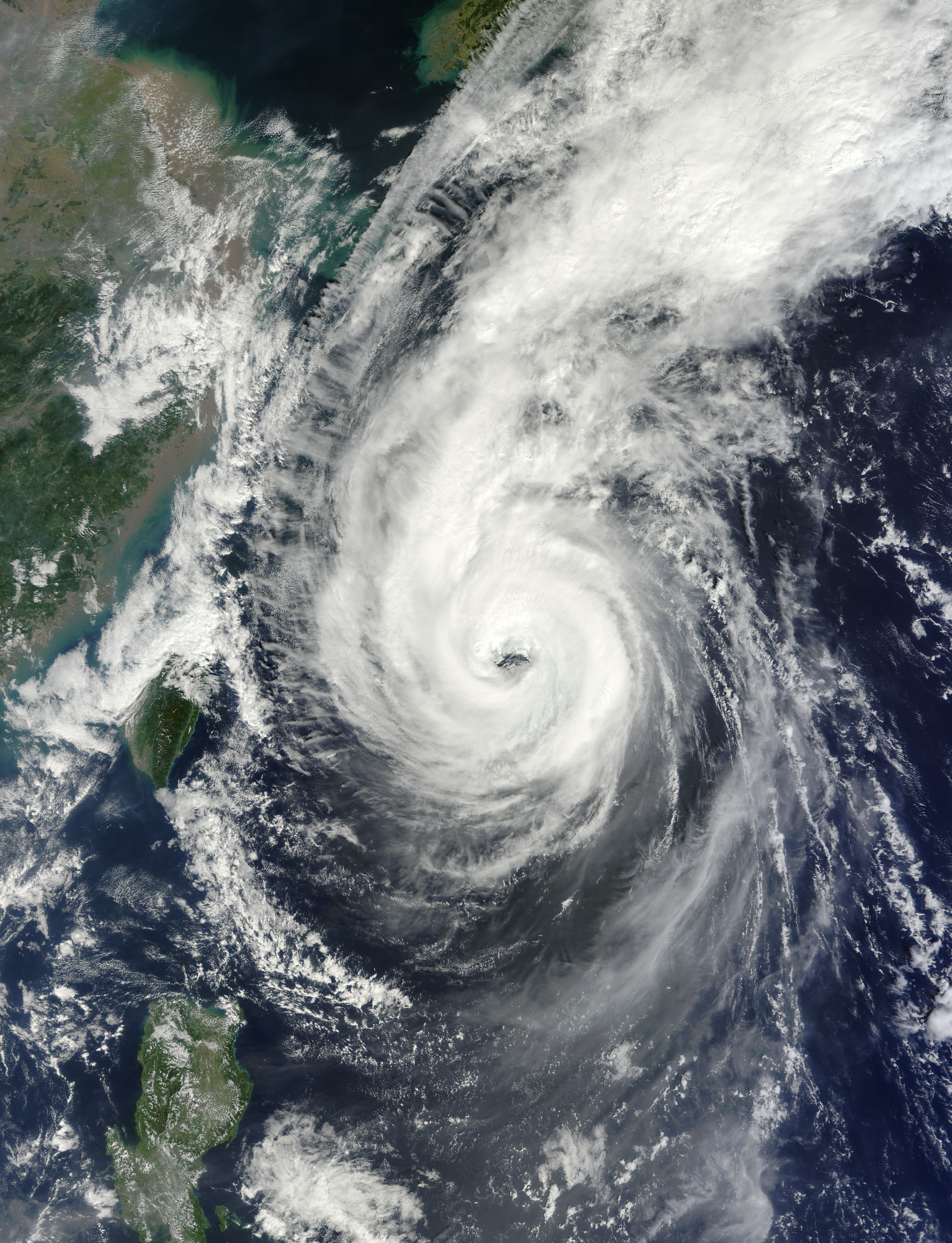
- Fitow approaching China at peak intensity on October 5

Meteorological history
- Formed: September 29, 2013
- Dissipated: October 7, 2013

Typhoon
- 10-minute sustained (JMA)
- Highest winds: 140 km/h (85 mph)
- Lowest pressure: 960 hPa (mbar); 28.35 inHg

Category 2-equivalent typhoon
- 1-minute sustained (SSHWS/JTWC)
- Highest winds: 165 km/h (105 mph)
- Lowest pressure: 956 hPa (mbar); 28.23 inHg

Overall effects
- Fatalities: 12 total
- Damage: $10.4 billion (2013 USD) (Fifth-costliest typhoon on record in nominal terms; third-costliest in Chinese history)
- Areas affected: China, Taiwan, Japan
- IBTrACS
- Part of the 2013 Pacific typhoon season

Typhoon Fitow, (Note: The name Fitow (Yapese: fitöw, [fɪtœw]) was contributed by the Federated States of Micronesia and is the name of a flower (Calophyllum inophyllum) in Yapese.) known in the Philippines as Typhoon Quedan, was the strongest typhoon to make landfall in mainland China during October since 2007. The twenty-first named storm of the extremely active 2013 Pacific typhoon season, Fitow developed on September 29 to the east of the Philippines. It initially tracked north-northwestward, gradually intensifying into a tropical storm and later to typhoon status, with winds of at least 120 km/h (75 mph). Fitow later turned west-northwest due to an intensifying ridge to the east, bringing the typhoon over the Ryukyu Islands, with peak winds of 140 km/h (85 mph) on October 5. The next day, the typhoon made landfall China in Fuding, Fujian Province, before eventually quickly weakening over land and dissipating on October 7.

Across its path, Fitow prompted many airlines to cancel flights and caused other transport disruptions. In Japan, the typhoon damaged 1,464 houses and left about 6,800 households without power on Miyako Island. Heavy rainfall in Taiwan flooded houses and caused mudslides that closed two highways. The damage was the heaviest in Fujian and Zhejiang provinces in China, which was near where Fitow made landfall. In Zhejiang, total rainfall peaked at 803 mm (31.6 in) in Yuyao, which flooded 70% of the town with up to 3 m (10 ft) of waters; as a result, the city received the worst flooding in a century, which disrupted aid distribution in the storm's aftermath. Across China, Fitow damaged about 95,000 houses and left at least 159,000 other houses without power. The storm also flooded about 75,000 hectares (190,000 acres) of fields and killed thousands of fish in fish farms. Damages in the country reached CN¥63.14 billion (US$10.3 billion), (Note: The total was originally reported in Chinese yuan. Total converted via the XE.com website.) and along with CN¥6 billion (US$1 billion) from insured losses, the total economic damages were CN¥69.14 billion (US$10.4 billion), making it, at the time, the costliest tropical cyclone on record in china until it was surpassed by Typhoon Doksuri in 2023 and Typhoon Yagi in 2024. An additional 12 fatalities were also reported, with eight of them related to electrocutions.

== Meteorological history ==
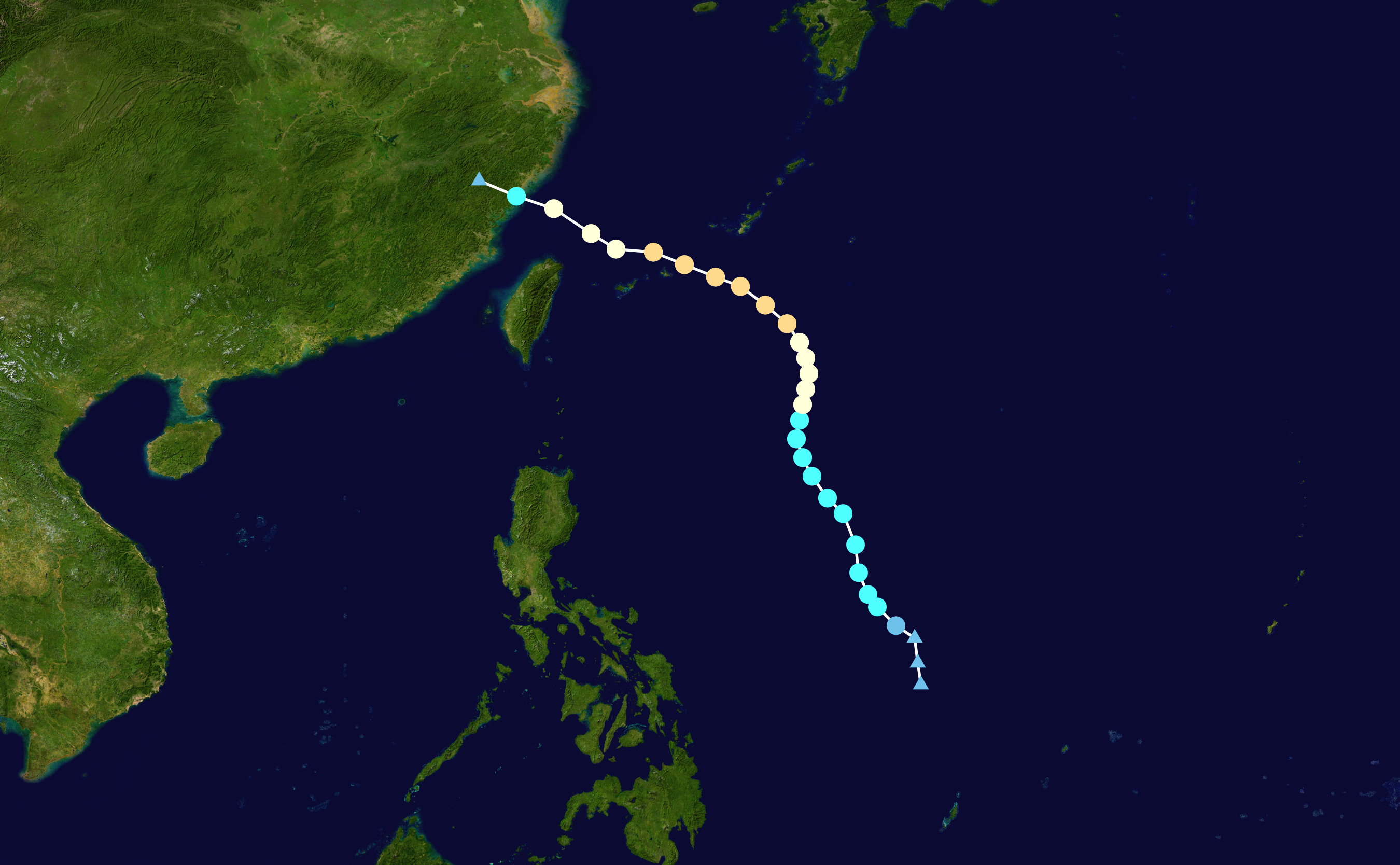
Map plotting the storm's track and intensity, according to the Saffir–Simpson scale Map key Saffir–Simpson scale Tropical depression (≤38 mph, ≤62 km/h) Tropical storm (39–73 mph, 63–118 km/h) Category 1 (74–95 mph, 119–153 km/h) Category 2 (96–110 mph, 154–177 km/h) Category 3 (111–129 mph, 178–208 km/h) Category 4 (130–156 mph, 209–251 km/h) Category 5 (≥157 mph, ≥252 km/h) Unknown Storm type Tropical cyclone Subtropical cyclone Extratropical cyclone, remnant low, tropical disturbance, or monsoon depression

Fitow originated from a persistent area of convection, or thunderstorms, approximately 310 km (190 mi) north-northeast of Palau during mid-late September. At the time, wind shear dislocated the convection to the west of a broad and poorly defined circulation. Although the system was poorly organized, tropical cyclone forecast models noted the potential for further development. The convection gradually consolidated and outflow increased to the west, indicative of increased organization. Early on September 29, the Japan Meteorological Agency (JMA) (Note: The Japan Meteorological Agency is the official Regional Specialized Meteorological Center for the western Pacific Ocean.) reported that the convection developed into a tropical depression about 310 km (190 mi) to the northeast of Palau. Around the same time, the Philippine Atmospheric, Geophysical and Astronomical Services Administration (PAGASA) also began issuing warnings for the depression, and as it was inside the Philippine Area of Responsibility (PAR), PAGASA assigned the local name Quedan. Early on September 30, the Joint Typhoon Warning Center (JTWC) (Note: The Joint Typhoon Warning Center is a joint United States Navy – United States Air Force task force that issues tropical cyclone warnings for the western Pacific Ocean and other regions.) initiated advisories on the depression and designated it 22W, noting that the system had become increasingly well-defined amid decreasing wind shear.

Due to a ridge to the east, 22W tracked north-northwest through an area of warm sea surface temperatures. As a result, at 12:00 UTC on September 30, the JMA upgraded the depression to a tropical storm, naming it Fitow. Although outflow and convection increased in general, the thunderstorm activity diminished over the center due to sinking air. By late on October 1, however, convection increased over Fitow's center, and on the following day, the JMA upgraded it to a severe tropical storm. On October 2, satellite imagery revealed a developing eye, although the rainbands wrapping into the eye were fragmented. It was only until midday UTC on October 3 for the JTWC to upgrade Fitow to typhoon status, with one-minute sustained winds of 120 km/h (75 mph). By that time, the convection had increased in coverage and intensity, with outflow increased by a trough to the north. The JMA did not follow suit until 24 hours later, at 12:00 UTC on October 4, by which time the eye had become better defined.

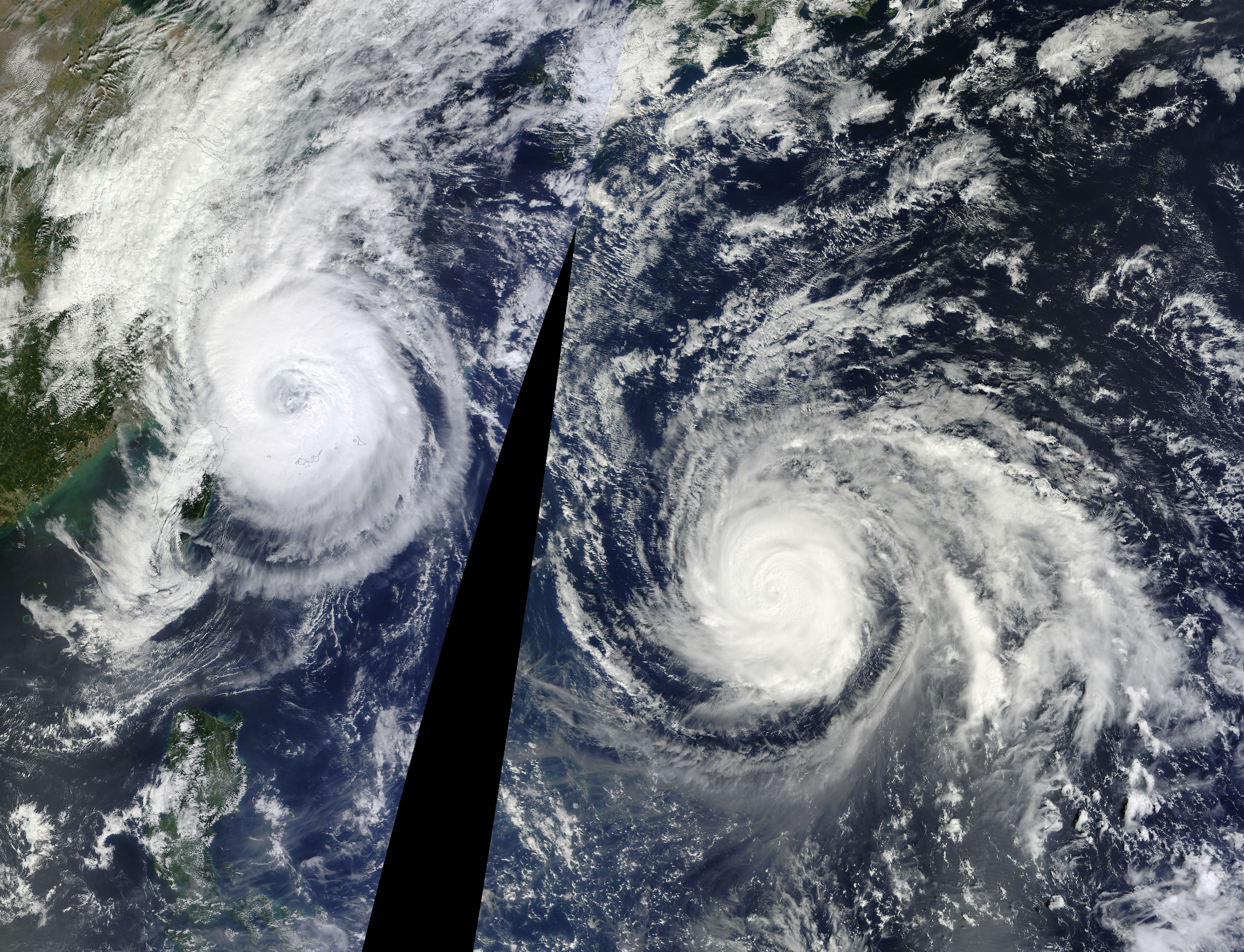
Typhoons Fitow (left) and Danas (right) simultaneously active on October 6

After strengthening into a typhoon, Fitow turned more to the northwest due to the ridge building to the east. Despite increasing wind shear, the typhoon continued to intensify due to amplified outflow. Late on October 4, the JMA upgraded Fitow to its peak intensity, with 10-minute sustained winds of 140 km/h (85 mph). Early on the following day, the JTWC estimated the typhoon's peak one-minute sustained winds of 105 mph (170 km/h), and shortly thereafter, the typhoon passed about 225 km (140 mi) south of Okinawa. By that time, the eye's width had expanded to 75 km (47 mi), which initially remained unaffected by the increased wind shear. Also on October 5, PAGASA issued its final advisory as the storm exited the PAR. At around 15:00 UTC, Fitow was about 40 km (25 mi) north of Miyako Island, by which time the eye began deteriorating. As the typhoon passed northeast of Taiwan, the ragged eye became cloud-filled and the convection weakened. Late on October 6, Fitow made landfall just south of Wenzhou in eastern China, in Fuding, Ningde, Fujian province. It became the strongest typhoon to make landfall in China during October since 1949, according to the China Meteorological Administration (CMA), with a minimum central pressure of 955 mbar (28.20 inHg) and sustained winds of 151 km/h (94 mph). Fitow rapidly weakened as it continued tracking northwestward near the border of Zhejiang and Fujian provinces, subsequently dissipating on October 7.

== Preparations ==
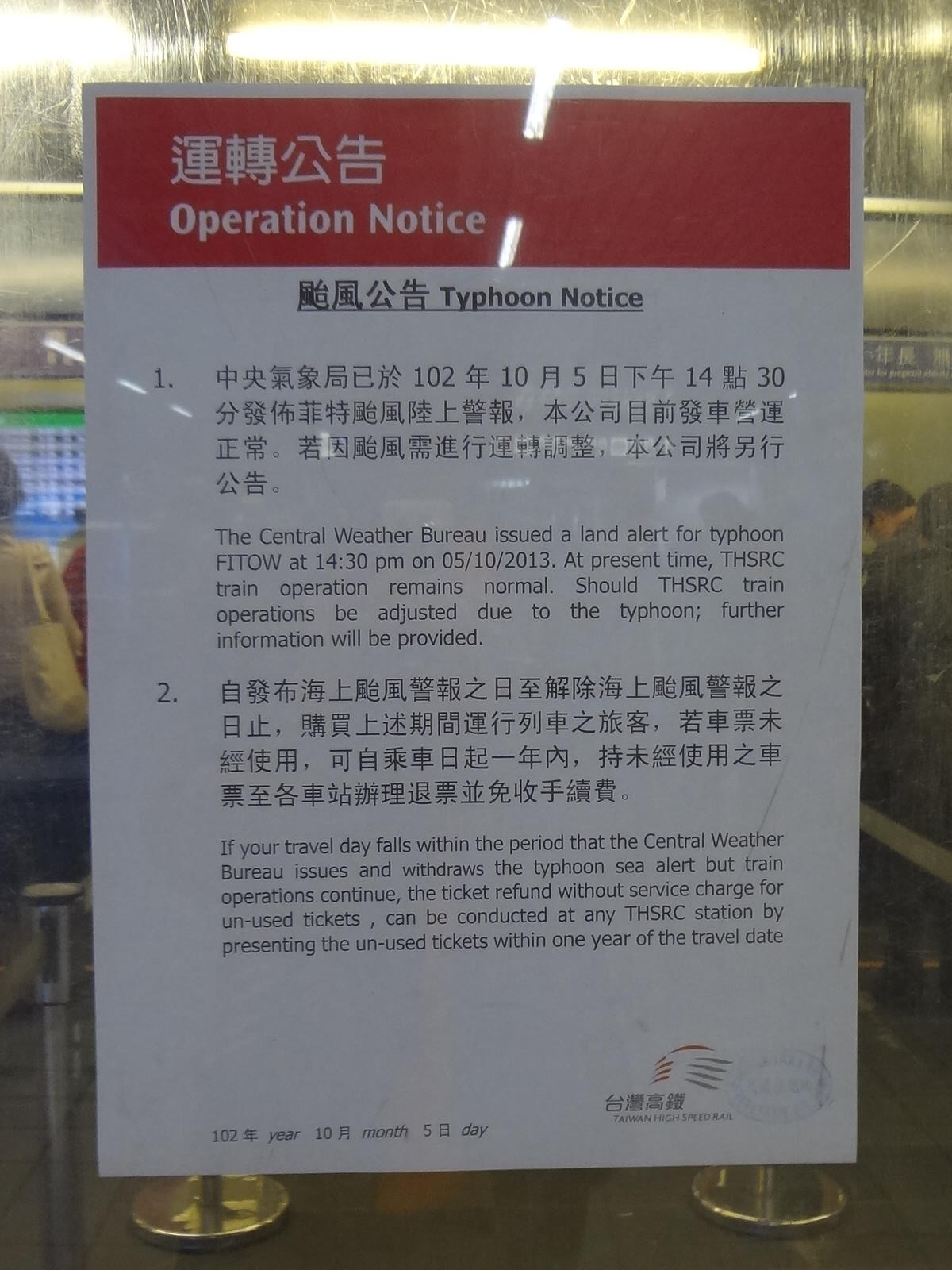
Taiwan High Speed Rail warning issued ahead of the storm

On the Japanese island of Okinawa, 288 flights at Naha Airport were canceled, affecting 28,000 people. Officials also canceled bus, monorail, and ferry services. In South Korea, organizers of the 2013 Formula One season issued a typhoon alert and prepared contingency plans in case Fitow impacted the Korean Grand Prix. Officials in Taiwan issued a storm warning before Fitow passed just north of the island. The Republic of China Army mobilized 20,000 troops for protections and standby operations. Seventeen ferry services between Taiwan and its offshore islands were suspended, and over 200 flights were canceled. Schools and government offices closed in portions of Taiwan due to the storm.

In anticipation of the storm, officials in China issued warnings for Zhejiang and Fujian for the potential of high winds and flooding, which was later credited for reducing casualties. The Chinese army was activated to assist in militating against potential flooding. Officials told boat owners to put their property in shelter, totaling 65,000 vessels ordered to return to report. Coastal facilities such as seaside bathing centers were closed. Before Fitow made landfall in China, about 177,000 people were evacuated in Fujian, while another 574,000 left their homes in Zhejiang, bringing the total number of evacuees to around 751,000. In Shanghai, 42 train or bus rides were canceled, along with 40 flights. Two airports in Zhejiang reported 49 canceled flights, while another 20 were canceled in Fujian.

== Impact ==
Costliest known Pacific typhoons (adjusted for inflation)
Rank	Typhoon	Season	Damage (2025 USD)
1	4 Doksuri	2023	$30.1 billion
2	4 Mireille	1991	$23.6 billion
3	5 Hagibis	2019	$21.8 billion
4	5 Saomai	2000	$17.3 billion
5	5 Jebi	2018	$16.7 billion
6	4 Songda	2004	$15.9 billion
7	5 Yagi	2024	$15.1 billion
8	2 Fitow	2013	$14.4 billion
9	4 Faxai	2019	$12.6 billion
10	4 Tokage	2004	$12.1 billion

In Japan, Fitow produced peak wind gusts of 133 km/h (83 mph) on Miyako Island, leaving about 6,800 homes without electricity. Winds gusts up to 193 km/h (120 mph) were recorded on Yoronjima to the north of Okinawa, while 167 km/h (104 mph) gusts were recorded at Kunigami on the northern tip of Okinawa. In Okinawa, the typhoon caused power outages, disrupted transportation, and damaged farms. In Japan, Fitow damaged 1,464 homes and injured five people.

While passing north of Taiwan, Fitow dropped heavy rainfall reaching 536 mm (21.1 in) at a station in Hsinchu County. In the county, the rains forced 224 people to evacuate their houses. Mudslides and the threat for flooding spurred officials to close portions of two provincial highways. The typhoon also produced strong winds that caused power outages for 6,900 people.

=== China ===
Throughout eastern China, the high winds and rains knocked down trees and ruined local shrimp and seaweed farms, and overall 75,000 hectares (190,000 acres) of crops were flooded, including 46,800 ha (116,000 acres) in Wenzhou. Widespread areas were flooded, forcing residents to travel by boats. Fitow damaged or destroyed about 95,000 houses. The typhoon killed 12 people in the country, and left ¥63.1 billion in damage (2013 RMB, $10.4 billion USD). Insured losses from Fitow totaled ¥6 billion (RMB, US$1 billion), the second costliest event on record for China.

As Fitow made landfall in mainland China, it produced wind gusts of 274 km/h (170 mph) in the Shiping Mountains of Zhejiang, setting a record for the province. The typhoon spread heavy rainfall across eastern China in the Jiangnan region, in conjunction with a plume of cold air. An area 175,000 km^{2} (68,000 mi^{2}) wide received 50 mm (2.0 in) of precipitation, while an area of 38,000 km^{2} (15,000 mi^{2}) wide received over 250 mm (9.8 in) of rainfall. Yuyao in Zhejiang reported a peak rainfall total of 803 mm (31.6 in), a record for the city, while Ningbo reported a daily average of 390 mm (15 in) over three days, setting a record. A station in Shanghai reported 152.9 mm (6.02 in), the highest daily rainfall total since 1961. The rains increased levels along 17 rivers, rising from 0.09 to 2.79 m (0.30 to 9.15 ft), and Lake Tai rose by 3.60 m (11.8 ft). The Yaojiang River, a tributary of the Yongjiang river, reached its highest levels on record, reaching a height of 5.33 m (17.5 ft) in Yuyao.

Across eastern China, Fitow left heavy damage due to strong winds, heavy rainfall, and a powerful storm surge. Floodwaters covered about 70% of the metropolis of Yuyao, reaching 3 m (9.8 ft) in some areas, which cut off power and water supply. The floods were the worst in a century for the city, covering most roadways, and forcing most schools, health facilities, and factories to close. In the city, about 100,000 people were forced to evacuate, with 289 temporary shelters opened. Damage in the city alone totaled about ¥20 billion (RMB, US$3.27 billion). In Ningbo in eastern Zhejiang, Fitow wrecked 26,180 houses and damaged local fish farms, killing 51,000 tons of fish. The storm forced 18,134 factories to shut down, and there were also power and telecommunication outages.

In Shanghai, high waters along the Huangpu River damaged a portion of a flood prevention wall. Rainfall caused several matches to be canceled at the 2013 Shanghai Masters. Flooding closed the city zoo and 60 parks, and entered 600 houses. In Cangnan County in Wenzhou, Fitow wrecked 1,200 houses, and throughout Wenzhou, two people died – one after being blown off a hill, and the other trapped under collapsed rubble. High winds left 254,746 people in Zhejiang without power, and eight people died in the province from electrocutions. Another two people died after driving into a flooded river. Throughout China, Fitow damaged or destroyed 95,000 houses.

== Aftermath ==
In Zhejiang, about 10,000 utility men worked to restore the widespread power outages. In the days following the storm, about 1.24 million people were forced to stay in shelters due to damage. A total of 11,732 soldiers or militia members assisted in helping in the storm's aftermath. Many cleared mudslides from roads, repaired dams, and helped people leave flooded homes. In Tongxiang in Zhejiang province, thousands of people blocked a highway in protest for not receiving aid, prompting the riot police to break up the gathering. The town did not receive supplies other than water tanks, due to it being designated a "self-rescuing area" according to a local official. Ping An Insurance received insurance claims for 11,348 flooded cars in the days after the storm. The storm caused slight delays to shipping in Ningbo and Shanghai. The Chinese Ministry of Finance and Civil Affairs allocated ¥118 million (US$19.3 million) in funding for Zhejiang and Fujian provinces after the storm.

In general, local governments assisted the affected storm victims by providing food, water, and clothing, even traveling by canoe to distribute aid. However, residents in Yuyao complained about insufficient assistance, as many people were without food or clean water for several days, due to ongoing flooding making distribution difficult. This sparked thousands of people to protest the government, although they dispersed after increased numbers of policemen. Residents were initially required to show food coupons to receive meals, but later anyone with a residence permit could receive the meals; however, the food distribution was disorganized, and there were reports of people looting for food. By October 18, the flooding in Yuyao had subsided and roadways had reopened, and power service was gradually restored. Due to the extended disruptions to the city, garbage service was halted. Two people in Yuyao were arrested after spreading false rumors online that reservoir collapsed during the storm, killing 40 people.

=== Retirement ===
During their 2014 annual session, the ESCAP/WMO Typhoon Committee announced that the name Fitow would be retired from the naming lists. The name Mun was chosen to replace Fitow.

== See also ==
- Weather of 2013
- Tropical cyclones in 2013
- Typhoon Rananim (2004)
- Typhoon Matsa (2005)
- Tropical Storm Bilis (2006)

Costliest typhoons in Chinese history:

- Typhoon Lekima (2019) – the fourth-costliest typhoon in Chinese history
- Typhoon Doksuri (2023) – the costliest typhoon on record, also the costliest in Chinese history
- Typhoon Yagi (2024) – the second-costliest typhoon in China
