= Gardo =

The name Gardo may refer to:

- Gardo House, a historic residence in Salt Lake City, Utah, USA
- Gardo Versoza (born 1969), a Filipino actor and comedian
- Typhoon Gardo, a powerful 2018 tropical cyclone
- Qardho, also known as Gardo, a city in Somalia
