= List of storms named Henry =

The name Henry has been used to name seven tropical cyclones worldwide: six in the Philippines by PAGASA in the Western Pacific Ocean and one in the South Pacific Ocean. It has also been used for one European windstorm.

In the Western Pacific, it replaced the name Hambalos after it was removed following the 2002 Pacific typhoon season:

- Typhoon Prapiroon (2006) (T0606, 07W, Henry) – affected the Philippines and China, killing 94
- Severe Tropical Storm Malou (2010) (T1009, 10W, Henry) – struck Japan
- Typhoon Matmo (2014) (T1410, 10W, Henry) – affected Taiwan and partially blamed for a plane crash that killed 48 people
- Tropical Storm Son-Tinh (2018) (T1809, 11W, Henry) – severely affected Vietnam and southern China
- Typhoon Hinnamnor (2022) (T2211, 12W, Henry) – a powerful and destructive typhoon which affected Japan and South Korea, killing 12
- Severe Tropical Storm Maysak (2026) (T2610, 10W, Henry) – a deadly storm that affected Philippines, China, and Vietnam, killing 50

Preceded by Gardo	Pacific typhoon season names (Philippines); Henry	Succeeded by Inday

In the South Pacific:

- Cyclone Henry (1979) – a strong tropical cyclone that affected Vanuatu and New Zealand.

In Europe:

- Storm Henry (2016) – affected the British Isles.
