= Yeh Ken-chuang =

Taiwanese master carpenter and builder

- 葉根壯
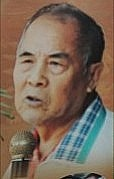
- Born: 31 July 1932; Magong, Penghu, Taiwan
- Died: 23 July 2014 (aged 81); Huxi, Penghu, Taiwan
- Other name: Master Chuang
- Occupations: Builder and master carpenter

Yeh Ken-chuang (Chinese: 葉根壯, Taiwanese: Ia̍p Kun-tsòng, 31 July 1932 – 23 July 2014) was a Taiwanese master carpenter, woodcarver, and expert in traditional Taiwanese architecture from Magong. He was known as "Master Chuang" within the carpentry community in Taiwan.

== Early life ==
Yeh Ken-chuang was born 31 July 1932 in Magong, Penghu, Taiwan. He was born into a family of woodworkers from Kinmen; although his branch of the family moved to Penghu in the early 1600s. His father, Yeh Tung, was a carpenter who mostly built residences. His paternal uncle was Yeh Ma-li, the chief temple builder in Penghu from 1860 to 1890. His father and uncles were trained by their father, Yeh Yuan.

Yeh Ken-chuang's formal education ended with the start of World War II. At the age of thirteen, he started working in his brother-in-law's grocery store. The store's landlord taught Yeh Ken-chuang math and how to calculate the amount of materials needed for a job.

When his brother-in-law died four years later, Yeh Ken-chuang asked if he could help his uncle Yeh Teh-ling, who was building Wufu Temple on Wangan Island. He became one of his uncle's five official disciples. Yeh Ken-chuang spent eleven years learning carpentry and woodcarving from his uncle by building ships, houses, and temples.

== Career ==
Yeh Ken-chuang became the fifth generation of his family to choose woodworking as a profession. In 1960, Yeh Ken-chuang started his own practice as a damusi, or chief carpenter. Over the course of his career, he became a master carpenter, woodcarver, and expert in traditional Taiwanese architecture. He specialized in large traditional wooden architectural structures, including temples and other buildings. However, his work differed from traditional construction because he incorporated reinforced concrete which could survive much longer than wood.

The first temple he designed on his own was the Hsu Village Gangyuan Temple. He oversaw the reconstruction of Hsiliao Daitian Temple in Penghu in 1963. He ultimately created more than 70 temples and left the designs for another 230. His notable works included the Long Men Kuanyin Temple and the Wang An Wu Fu Temple, both located in the Penghu Islands of Taiwan.

He became an instructor for a Penghu traditional architecture program in 2008.

Yeh Ken-chuang was known as "Master Chuang" within the carpentry community in Taiwan. In 2010, the government of Penghu County certified Yeh Ken-chuang as a preservationist of traditional timber framing techniques.

== Personal life ==
Yeh Ken-chuang lived and worked in the area of Penghu to be close to his family.

Yeh Ken-chuang and his wife died in the TransAsia Airways Flight 222 crash near Magong Airport in Huxi, Penghu, Taiwan, on 23 July 2014, at the age of 81.

== Honors ==
The government nominated Yeh Ken-chuang as a preserver of large-scale carpentry skills in 2010, the first step in becoming a "Living National Treasure". The final evaluation for the award was scheduled on 29 July 2014, six days after his death.

President Ma Ying-jeou announced that the Bureau of Cultural Heritage would preserve Yeh Ken-chuang's records and documents on his timber framing techniques.
