= Typhoon Matmo (2014) =

Pacific typhoon in 2014

Typhoon Matmo (Henry)
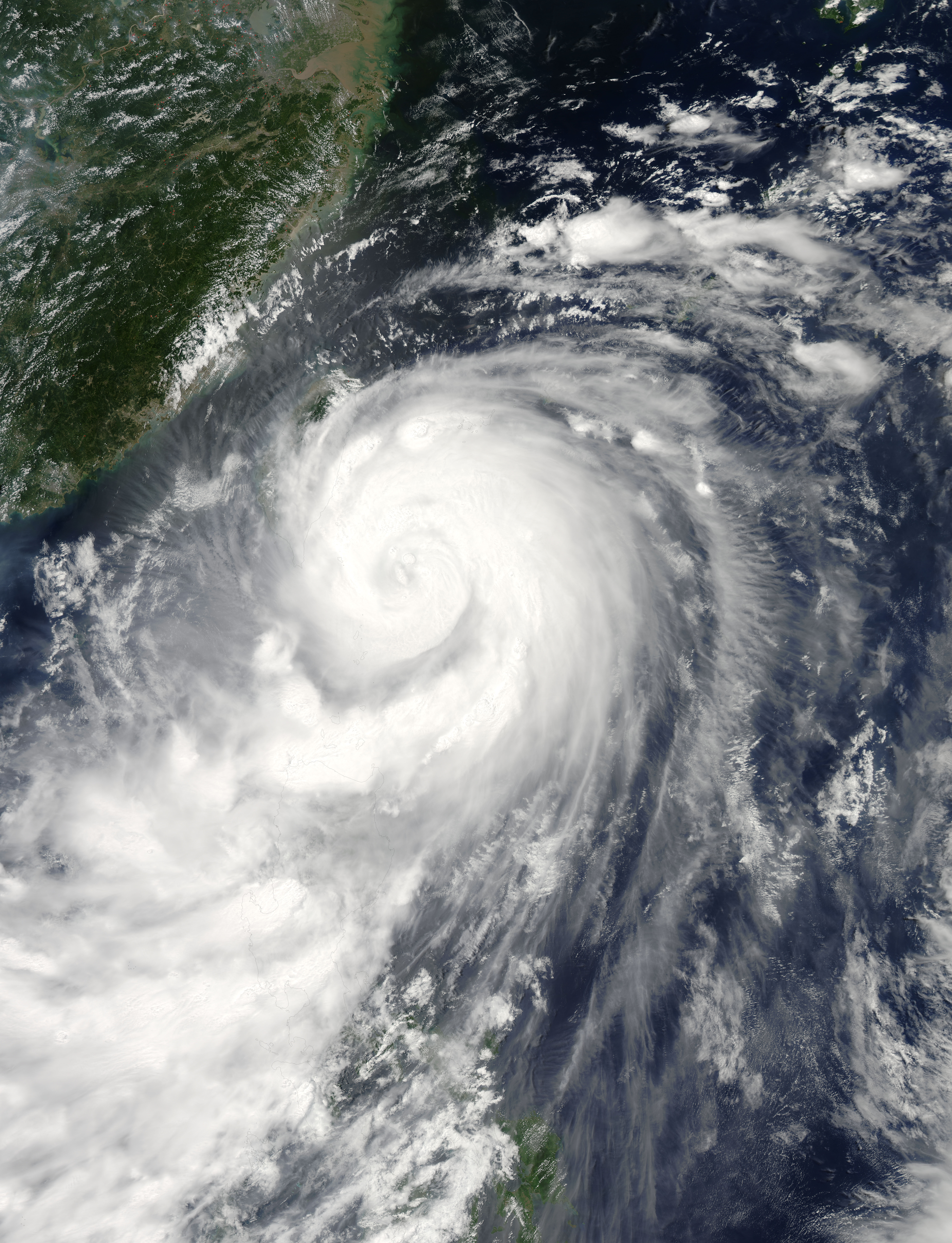
- Typhoon Matmo approaching Taiwan at peak intensity on July 22

Meteorological history
- Formed: July 16, 2014
- Extratropical: July 25, 2014
- Dissipated: July 26, 2014

Typhoon
- 10-minute sustained (JMA)
- Highest winds: 130 km/h (80 mph)
- Lowest pressure: 965 hPa (mbar); 28.50 inHg

Category 2-equivalent typhoon
- 1-minute sustained (SSHWS/JTWC)
- Highest winds: 155 km/h (100 mph)
- Lowest pressure: 959 hPa (mbar); 28.32 inHg

Overall effects
- Fatalities: 65 total
- Damage: $418 million (2014 USD)
- Areas affected: Philippines; Taiwan; China; Korea
- IBTrACS
- Part of the 2014 Pacific typhoon season

Typhoon Matmo, (Note: The name Matmo (Chamorro: måtmo, [mɑtmo]) was contributed by the United States and means "heavy rain" in Chamorro.) known in the Philippines as Typhoon Henry, was the first tropical cyclone to impact Taiwan in 2014. It was the tenth named storm and the fourth typhoon of the 2014 Pacific typhoon season. The typhoon is believed to be one of the main reasons behind the crash of TransAsia Airways Flight 222, which occurred a day after it made landfall. There were fifty-four passengers on board (four of whom were reported to be children) and a crew of four, of whom 48 were killed. Taiwan News reported that "first suspicions hinted" the accident might be related to Matmo. The typhoon developed from a cluster of thundershowers consolidating around an area of low pressure in the doldrums. It initially followed a westward track, then made a sharp northwest turn before making landfall on Taiwan, and then China. After moving further inland, Matmo slowly curved back northeastwards and became extratropical before its remnants affected the Korean Peninsula.

The typhoon caused damage of US$418 million and there were 65 deaths related to the storm. Matmo brought tropical storm force winds and heavy rainfall to the Philippines, typhoon force winds and torrential rainfall to China and Taiwan and heavy rains to Korea. Two deaths in the Philippines were attributed to the typhoon. The storm left 31,505 people in Taiwan without power. 50 miles per hour (80 km/h) gusts were reported in the Gimpo International Airport of Seoul.

== Meteorological history ==
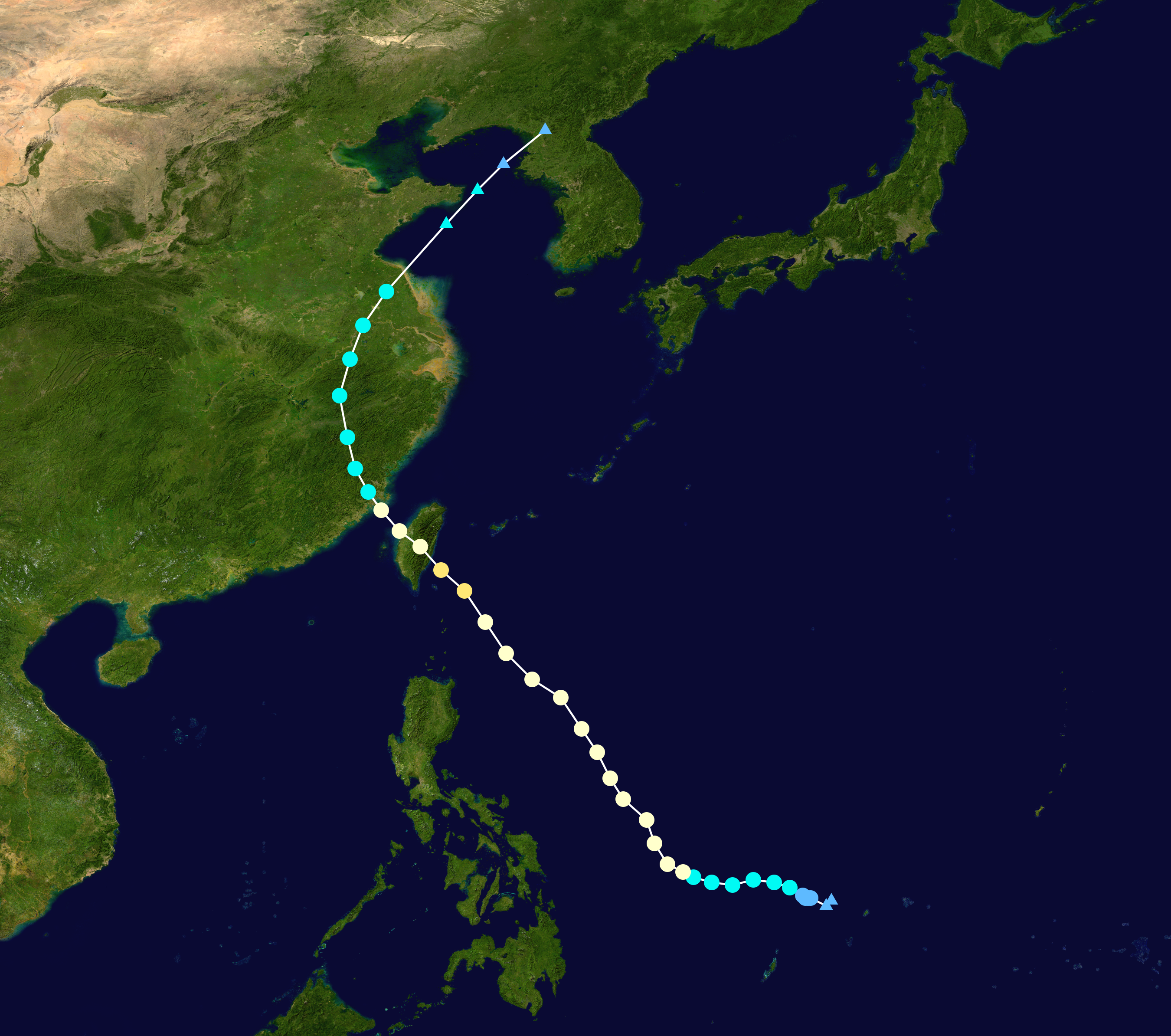
Map plotting the storm's track and intensity, according to the Saffir–Simpson scale Map key Saffir–Simpson scale Tropical depression (≤38 mph, ≤62 km/h) Tropical storm (39–73 mph, 63–118 km/h) Category 1 (74–95 mph, 119–153 km/h) Category 2 (96–110 mph, 154–177 km/h) Category 3 (111–129 mph, 178–208 km/h) Category 4 (130–156 mph, 209–251 km/h) Category 5 (≥157 mph, ≥252 km/h) Unknown Storm type Tropical cyclone Subtropical cyclone Extratropical cyclone, remnant low, tropical disturbance, or monsoon depression

The origins of Matmo can be tracked back to an area of low pressure that developed in the Intertropical Convergence Zone, about 280 km (170 mi) east of Chuuk on July 9, 2014. Over the next few days, the system's low-level circulation center (LLCC) slowly consolidated with convective banding developing around its southern periphery and a burst of convection over its center. Located in a favorable region, the system slowly intensified, prompting the Joint Typhoon Warning Center (JTWC) to issue a Tropical Cyclone Formation Alert (TCFA) on the system, on July 16. Around the same time, the Regional Specialized Meteorological Center in Tokyo, operated by the Japan Meteorological Agency (JMA) started tracking the system as a tropical depression. Tracking slowly northwestward, the depression continued to consolidate while the JTWC initiated advisories on it with the identifier 10W. During the evening of July 17, the JMA upgraded the system to a tropical storm, and assigned it the name Matmo. The subsequent six hours saw the JTWC recognizing Matmo as a tropical storm and the Philippine Atmospheric, Geophysical and Astronomical Services Administration (PAGASA) naming it Henry as it entered the Philippine area of responsibility. Matmo accelerated somewhat on July 18 as it passed 450 km (280 mi) north-northwest of Koror, Palau. Around that time, the JMA upgraded Matmo to a severe tropical storm.

By July 19, the center of Matmo had become obscured as deep central convection developed over it. Microwave satellite imagery showed improving convective banding despite the overall structure of the storm being slightly elongated. Subsequent intensification resulted in the JMA upgrading Matmo to a typhoon. The convective banding around the LLCC started to curl inwards as an eye-like feature started developing. Increasing wind shear stemming from the subtropical ridge steering the typhoon inhibited further organization. By July 21, the shear abated somewhat and allowed for some intensification. Tracking well to the southwest of Okinawa, the typhoon increased in both size and organization, with a secondary convective rainband developing along the northern half of the system by July 22. Upper-level outflow also improved and fueled the expansion of convection. A broad eye feature developed with strong convective rainbands wrapped tightly into it. The storm reached peak intensity on July 22, with maximum sustained winds of 140 km/h (87 mph) and a central barometric pressure of 960 mbar (hPa; 28.35 inHg). Around the same time the JTWC estimated Matmo to have acquired one-minute sustained winds of 155 km/h (96 mph), ranking the system as a Category 2-equivalent on the Saffir–Simpson hurricane wind scale. The storm continued on its northwesterly track and made landfall in Taiwan, south of Hualien. The strongest gusts of 212 km/h (132 mph) were recorded on Orchid Island.

Emerging over the Taiwan Strait early on July 23, Matmo was greatly weakened by its passage over Taiwan. Convective rainbands diminished significantly and its circulation became severely disrupted by Taiwan's rugged terrain. The JMA downgraded Matmo into a severe tropical storm and eventually a tropical storm during this process. The JTWC, however, maintained Matmo as a typhoon during this time. The storm made its second landfall on China, south of Putian, while parts of its rainbands were still over Taiwan and the Philippines. Once onshore, the JTWC downgraded Matmo to a tropical storm and issued their final advisory. The JMA, however, continued tracking Matmo as a tropical storm until it became extratropical on July 25.

== Preparations and impact ==
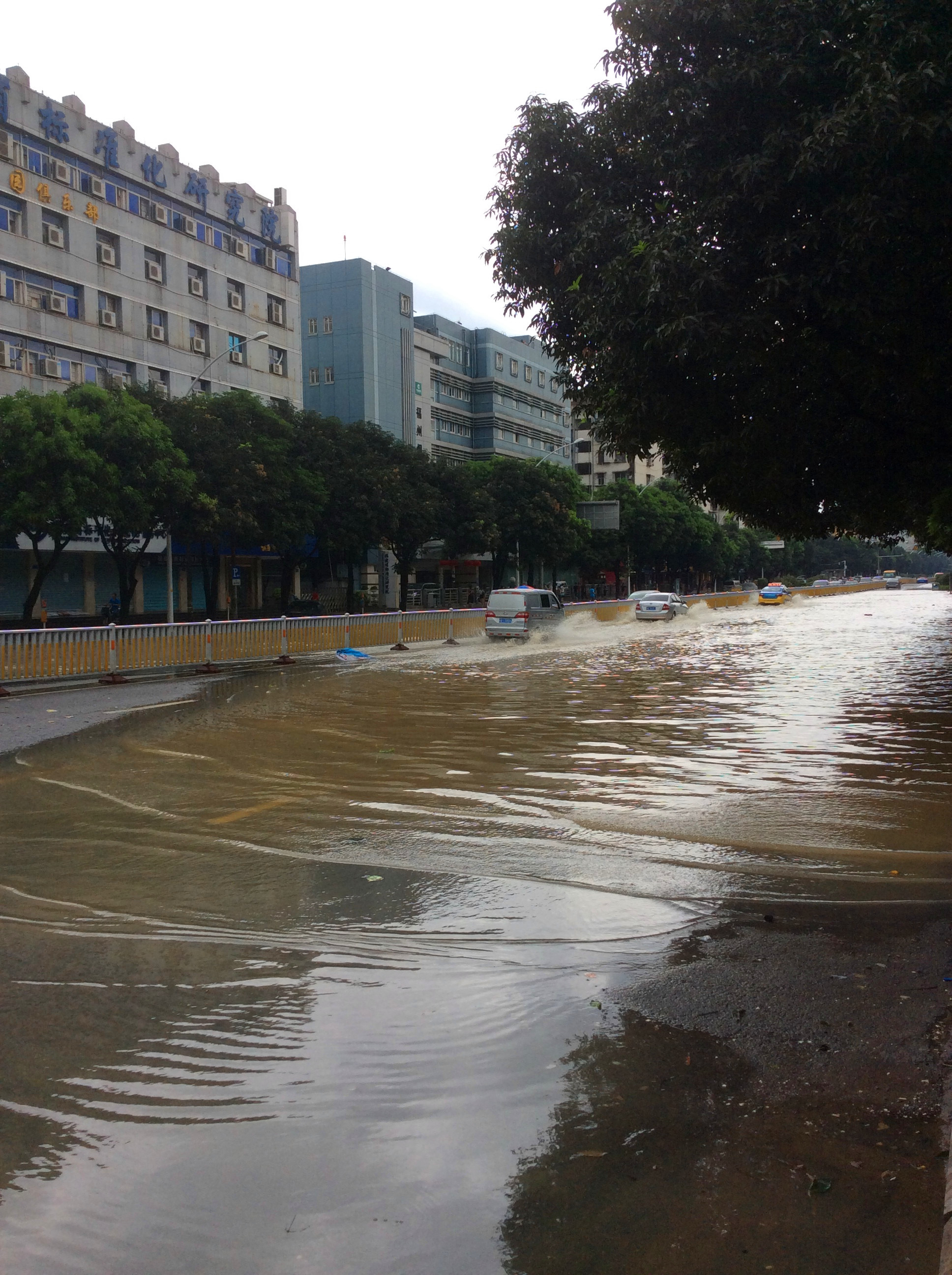
Street flooding in Fuzhou following Typhoon Matmo

The remnants of Matmo brought generally light to moderate rains across South Korea, with Seoul reporting 13 mm (0.5 in). Similar rains were expected over Hokkaido, Japan, with forecasts showing 25 to 51 mm (1 to 2 in) over the island.

=== Taiwan ===
About 5,400 tourists evacuated from two islands of Taiwan. Taiwan's military had gathered and distributed sandbags in anticipation of flooding.

The storm made landfall over Taiwan at peak intensity early on July 23. One person was reported dead and some damages were reported, and another 5 were injured, due to the storm. A tourist was also reported missing after taking pictures on a shore. Agricultural losses throughout Taiwan amounted to at least NT$594.9 million (US$20 million). Hualien County sustained the greatest damage, accounting for half the losses.

=== China ===
In China, an Orange Tropical Cyclone Alert in areas near Fuzhou. Throughout the country, 16 people were killed and economic losses amounted to ¥2.47 billion (US$398 million).

Throughout Fujian Province, 182 EMU trains suffered outages.

== See also ==
- Weather of 2014
- Tropical cyclones in 2014
- Other tropical cyclones named Matmo
- Other tropical cyclones named Henry
- Typhoon Sepat (2007)
- Typhoon Kalmaegi (2008)
- Typhoon Morakot (2009)
- Typhoon Saola (2012)
