= Typhoon Maria (2018) =

Pacific typhoon in 2018

Typhoon Maria (Gardo)
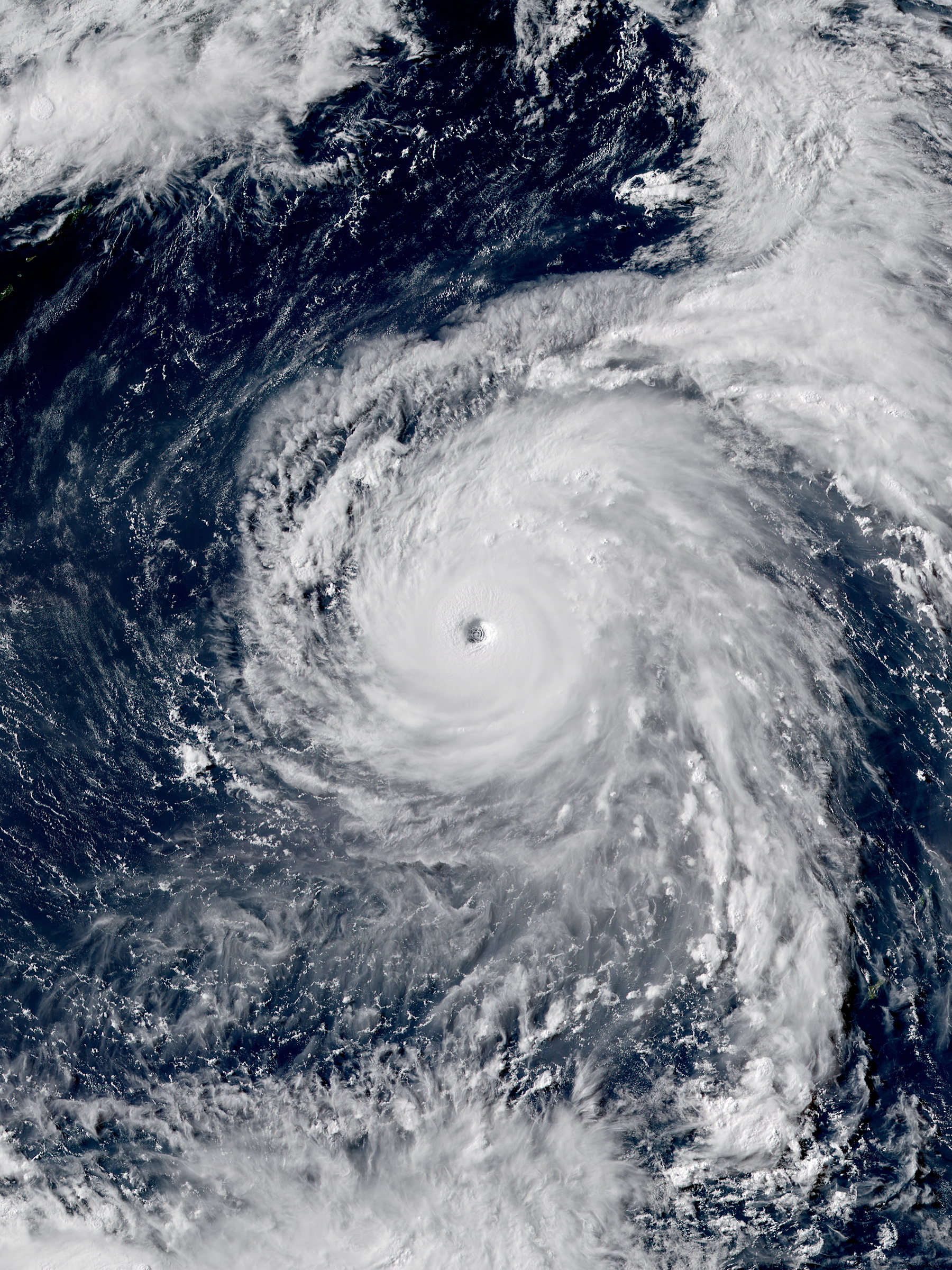
- Typhoon Maria at peak intensity on July 8

Meteorological history
- Formed: July 3, 2018
- Dissipated: July 12, 2018

Violent typhoon
- 10-minute sustained (JMA)
- Highest winds: 195 km/h (120 mph)
- Lowest pressure: 915 hPa (mbar); 27.02 inHg

Category 5-equivalent super typhoon
- 1-minute sustained (SSHWS/JTWC)
- Highest winds: 270 km/h (165 mph)
- Lowest pressure: 910 hPa (mbar); 26.87 inHg

Overall effects
- Fatalities: 2 total
- Damage: $637 million (2018 USD)
- Areas affected: Mariana Islands, Ryukyu Islands, Taiwan, China
- IBTrACS
- Part of the 2018 Pacific typhoon season

Typhoon Maria, (Note: The name Maria (Chamorro: Maria, [mæɾiæ]) was contributed by the United States and is a feminine given name in Chamorro.) known in the Philippines as Typhoon Gardo, was a powerful tropical cyclone that affected Guam, the Ryukyu Islands, Taiwan, and East China in early July 2018. Developing into the eighth named tropical storm of the 2018 Pacific typhoon season and passing the Mariana Islands on July 4, Maria strengthened into the fourth typhoon of the season and underwent rapid intensification the next day amid favorable environmental conditions.

The typhoon reached its first peak intensity on July 6; subsequently, Maria weakened due to an eyewall replacement cycle, but it reintensified and reached a second, stronger peak intensity on July 9 with 10-minute sustained winds of 195 km/h (121 mph) and a minimum pressure of 915 hPa (mbar; 27.02 inHg). Over the next three days, it started to gradually weaken due to another eyewall replacement cycle and decreasing sea surface temperatures. After crossing the Yaeyama Islands and passing north of Taiwan on July 10, Maria ultimately made landfall over Fujian, China, early on July 11, before dissipating the next day.

Early in its lifetime, Maria brought winds of tropical storm force to Guam, damaging aircraft at Anderson Air Force Base and knocking out power across the island. Damage in Guam was valued at US$150,000. (Note: All currencies are in their 2018 values unless otherwise noted.) On July 10, Maria brought strong winds to Okinawa Prefecture, inflicting significant crop damage. Losses in the prefecture reached JP¥853.7 million (US$7.730 million). (Note: All currencies are converted to United States Dollars using data from the International Monetary Fund published by the World Bank.) Simultaneously, Maria produced heavy rains and strong winds across Taiwan, killing one and injuring eight. Power to nearly 60,000 households was cut and agricultural damage was around NT$1.3 million (US$43,000). From landfall to dissipation, Maria impacted the Chinese provinces of Fujian, Zhejiang, Jiangxi, and Hunan with flooding rain and gusty winds. At least 510,000 people in coastal regions evacuated and one person was killed in Jiangxi. Around 9,300 houses and over 37,000 hectares (91,000 acres) of cropland were damaged. Schools and workplaces were closed in parts of Fujian and more than 200 flights were cancelled. Train and ferry services were also disrupted. Power outages were widespread in Fujian, where more than 320,000 customers lost power. Economic losses across China were about CN¥4.16 billion (US$629 million).

== Meteorological history ==
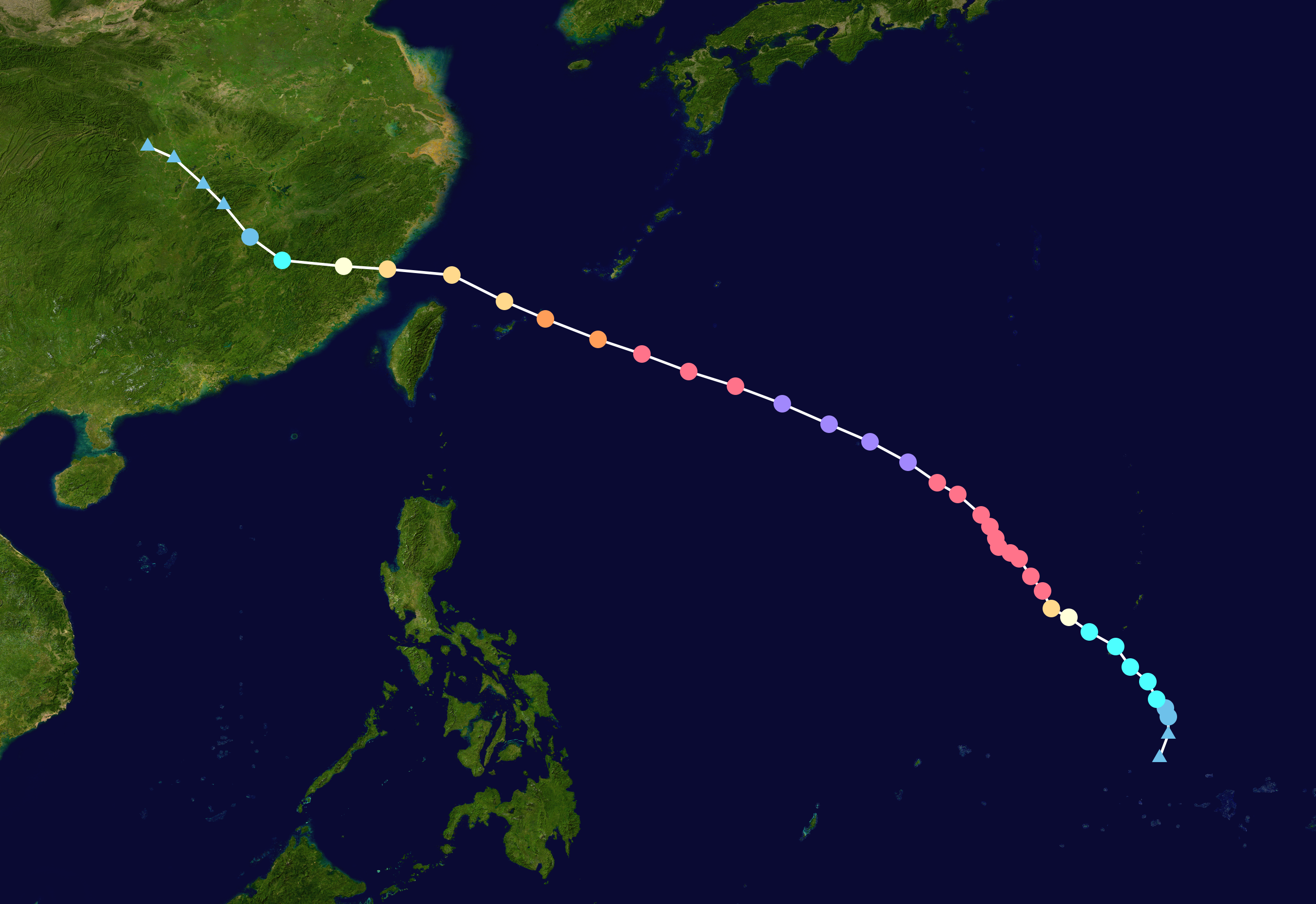
Map plotting the storm's track and intensity, according to the Saffir–Simpson scale Map key Saffir–Simpson scale Tropical depression (≤38 mph, ≤62 km/h) Tropical storm (39–73 mph, 63–118 km/h) Category 1 (74–95 mph, 119–153 km/h) Category 2 (96–110 mph, 154–177 km/h) Category 3 (111–129 mph, 178–208 km/h) Category 4 (130–156 mph, 209–251 km/h) Category 5 (≥157 mph, ≥252 km/h) Unknown Storm type Tropical cyclone Subtropical cyclone Extratropical cyclone, remnant low, tropical disturbance, or monsoon depression

On July 3, the Japan Meteorological Agency (JMA) declared that a tropical depression had formed at 00:00 UTC about 500 km (310 mi) southeast of Guam. (Note: The Japan Meteorological Agency is the official Regional Specialized Meteorological Center for the western Pacific Ocean.) The broad system tracked northwest around a region of high atmospheric pressure to its north as it began to consolidate, with the United States-based Joint Typhoon Warning Center (JTWC) determining that the system had become a tropical depression at 12:00 UTC. Amid rather favorable environmental conditions encompassing high sea surface temperatures of 30–31 °C (86–88 °F), low-to-moderate wind shear, and wind patterns in the upper troposphere aiding the development of thunderstorm activity, the system intensified modestly, with the JTWC assessing that it became a tropical storm at 00:00 UTC on July 4. Twelve hours later, the JMA stated that the depression had become a tropical storm and named the system Maria. On July 5, Maria began to rapidly intensify as it developed an eye feature. The satellite presentation of the cyclone improved drastically over the next 24 hours, with the eye contracting to a diameter of 20 km (12 mi). The JTWC assessed that Maria became a super typhoon at 00:00 UTC on July 6, (Note: The JTWC defines a "super typhoon" as a tropical cyclone within the western North Pacific with sustained winds of at least 240 km/h (150 mph).) possessing maximum sustained winds of 250 km/h (160 mph). (Note: Wind estimates from the JMA and most other basins throughout the world are sustained over 10 minutes, while estimates from the JTWC are sustained over 1 minute. On average, 1-minute winds are about 12% higher than 10-minute winds.) Immediately after, Maria began to undergo an eyewall replacement cycle, with microwave satellite imagery revealing that a new eyewall had developed and encircled the original eyewall. The JMA, however, assessed that Maria continued to strengthen to reach an initial peak intensity at 12:00 UTC with winds of 195 km/h (121 mph) and a central pressure of 925 hPa (mbar; 27.32 inHg).

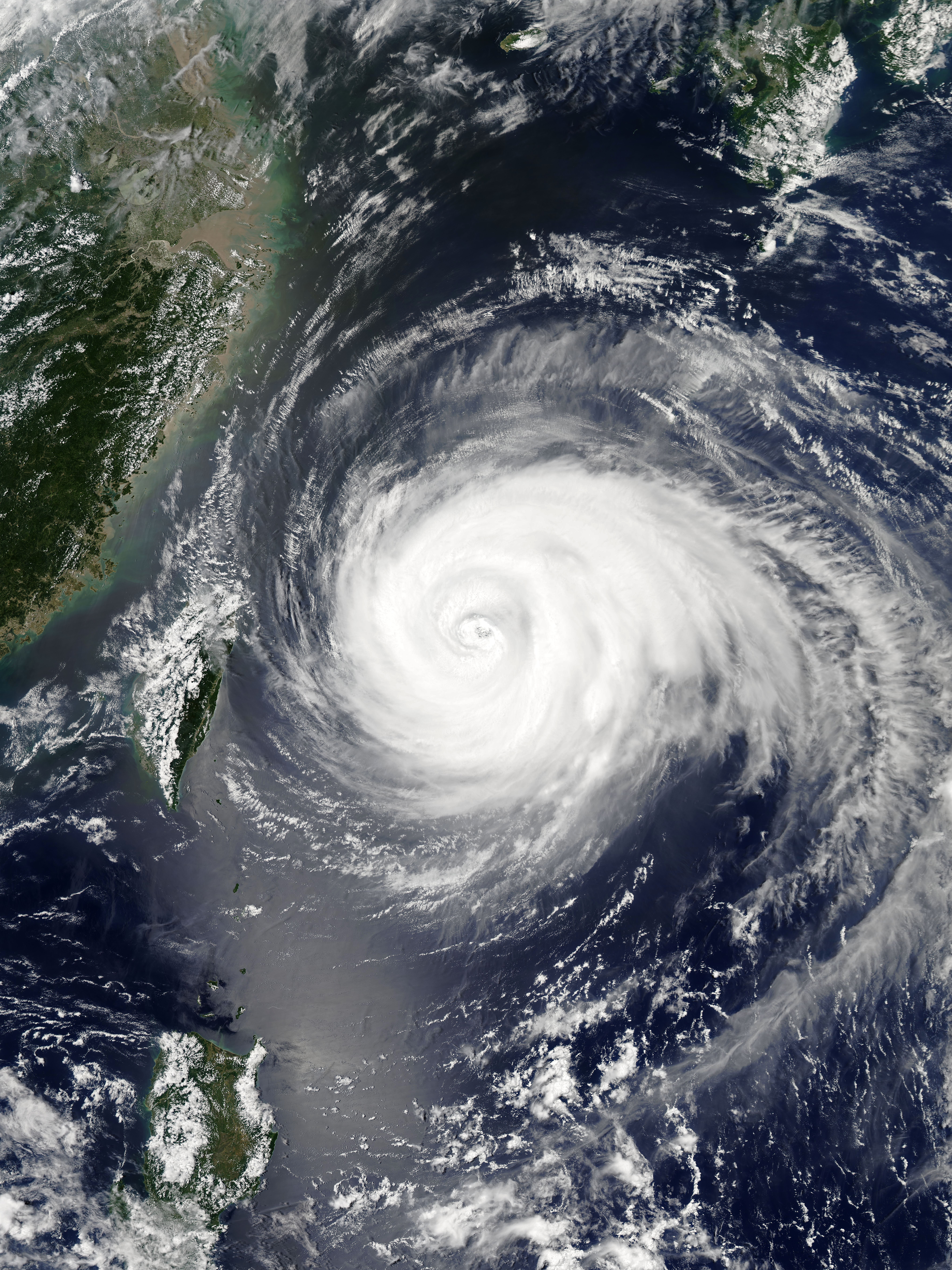
Typhoon Maria approaching Eastern China on July 10

Some weakening took place on July 7 as Maria went through the eyewall replacement cycle, with the JTWC assessing that Maria had dropped below super typhoon strength. A developing high-pressure area to Maria's northwest caused the system's forward motion to decrease while the inner eyewall dissipated and the outer eyewall began to contract. However, Maria did not immediately restrengthen as upper-level wind patterns temporarily became unfavorable. More substantial reintensification occurred on July 8 as Maria began to accelerate northwest once again and the system regained super typhoon strength at 00:00 UTC. The JTWC judged Maria to have reached its peak intensity at 12:00 UTC on July 8 with winds of 270 km/h (170 mph), equivalent to Category 5 status on the Saffir–Simpson scale. Displaying a well-defined eye 37 km (23 mi) wide, the system maintained an impressive satellite presentation into July 9, when the JMA estimated Maria reached peak intensity with winds of 195 km/h (121 mph) and a minimum pressure of 915 hPa (mbar; 27.02 inHg).

Typhoon Maria undergoing rapid intensification from 13:30 UTC to 20:30 UTC on July 5.

Late on July 9, Maria developed concentric eyewalls once again, indicating another eyewall replacement cycle was underway. Combined with decreasing upper oceanic heat content along the cyclone's path, Maria began to weaken steadily as it turned to the west-northwest. At 21:00 UTC on July 9, Maria entered the Philippine Area of Responsibility and received the local name Gardo. As the system passed north of Taiwan on July 10, frictional effects with the island's mountains as well as increasing northerly wind shear further weakened the cyclone. At 01:10 UTC on July 11, Maria made landfall over the Huangqi Peninsula of Lianjiang County, Fuzhou in Fujian, China. At the time, the system possessed 10-minute sustained winds of 155 km/h (96 mph) and 1-minute sustained winds of 175 km/h (109 mph). Rapid weakening took place once Maria moved inland, with the storm degrading to a tropical depression by 18:00 UTC. The remnant system continued inland and dissipated over Hubei before 00:00 UTC on July 13.

== Preparations and impact ==
=== Guam ===
Maria damaged a number of KC-135 aircraft in Andersen Air Force Base when passing near Guam as a tropical storm on July 5. The air base recorded an unusually high wind gust of 154 km/h (96 mph) associated with the passage of a mesoscale convective vortex and an embedded hot tower—features that often support rapid intensification of tropical cyclones. Several flights to and from the island were cancelled. An islandwide power outage occurred on July 5 after gusty winds downed power lines, and the local weather radar was knocked out. Damage on the island was estimated at US$150,000.

=== Ryukyu Islands ===
As a weakening typhoon, Maria made a direct hit on Miyakojima, Okinawa Prefecture, on July 10. On that day, schools in Miyakojima were closed, while flights to and from Miyako Airport and New Ishigaki Airport were cancelled. Ferry services connecting Miyakojima and Ishigaki Island with the surrounding islands were suspended for ten days. The sugarcane crop suffered severe wind damage, with some fields in Miyakojima reporting that up to 70 percent of their crops had been damaged. Total damage in Okinawa Prefecture was about JP¥853.7 million (US$7.730 million), of which nine-tenths came from the sugarcane crop. Other crops affected included pineapple, mango, millet, and okra. Damage to infrastructure was limited, reaching JP¥6.75 million (US$61,100) in Kumejima.

=== Taiwan ===
As Maria passed north of Taiwan, heavy rain and gusty winds impacted the island. Workplaces and schools were closed on July 10 and resumed operations on July 11. Services along the Taiwan High Speed Rail were interrupted by the adverse weather conditions. The Forestry Bureau closed 14 national forest recreational areas from July 10 to 12. A man in New Taipei City sustained fatal head injuries after losing his balance when inspecting his house. Seven men and a woman were injured in northern Taiwan by falling branches. Strong winds caused 59,485 households to lose power, though the situation was mostly resolved by July 11. Agricultural damage in Taiwan was valued at NT$1.3 million (US$43,000). The typhoon also eroded away part of Huaping Islet, causing its shape to now resemble a two-humped camel instead of a one-humped camel.

=== East China ===
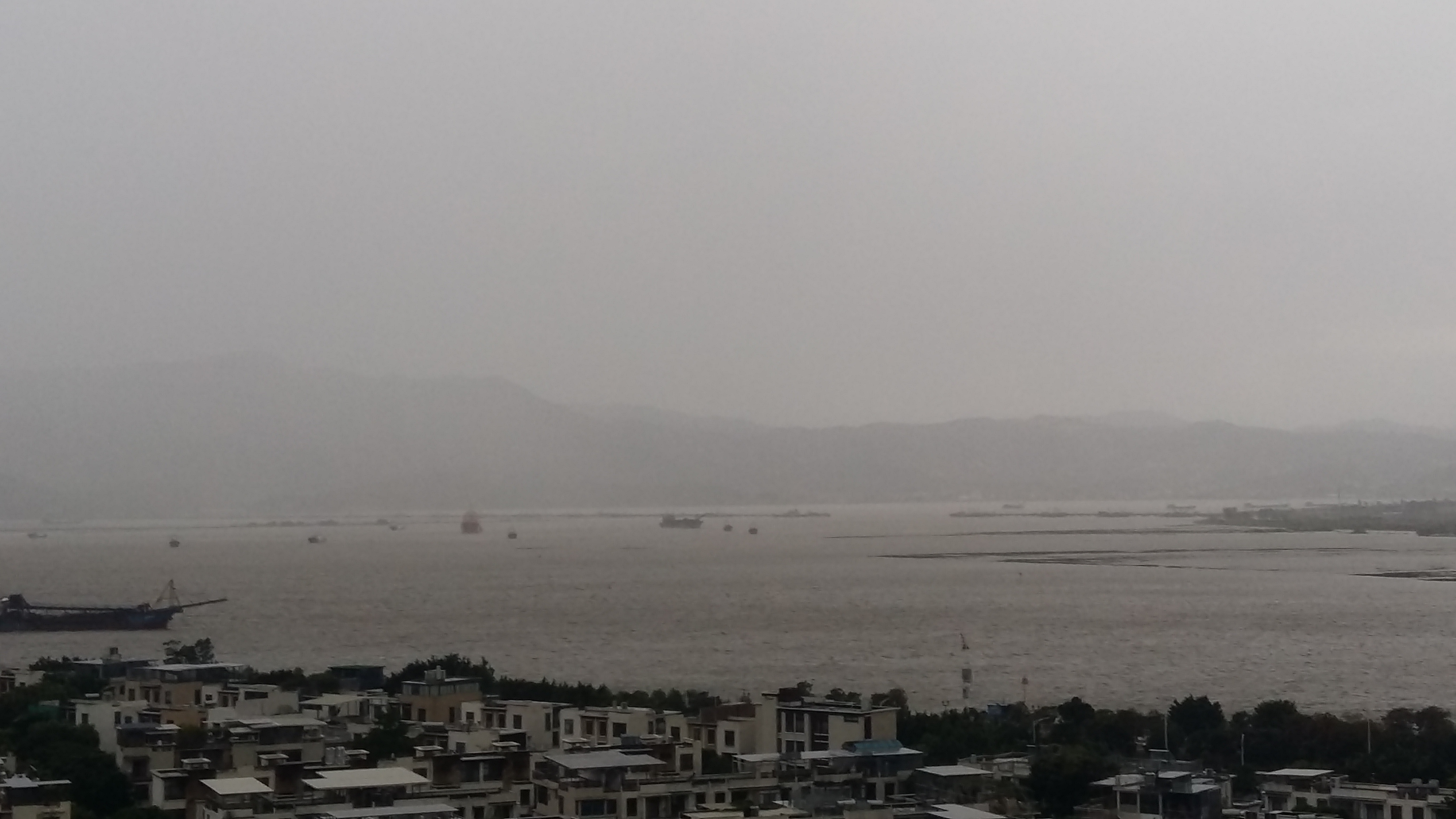
Stormy weather over the Min River in Fuzhou on July 11

Ahead of Typhoon Maria, authorities initiated evacuations in coastal parts of Fujian and Zhejiang provinces. By July 11, at least 226,600 people were evacuated in Fujian, while in Zhejiang, about 390,000 people were moved to safety, including 270,000 people from Wenzhou. In both provinces, fishing boats were ordered to return to port; the Port of Xiamen received 851 vessels, while 25,000 boats sought shelter in Zhejiang. Offshore fish farms in Fujian were closed and over 27,600 workers returned to shore. Ferry services between Xiamen and Kinmen were suspended. At least 200 train services in and out of Fujian were halted, while 206 flights to and from Zhejiang were cancelled. Across Fujian, 7,865 schools were closed and works at 4,439 construction sites were stopped. In Fuzhou, the provincial capital of Fujian, all schools and factories were closed on July 11. In Jiangxi province, authorities evacuated over 1,100 people, closed 21 tourist attractions, and suspended passenger transport services to Fujian and Zhejiang.

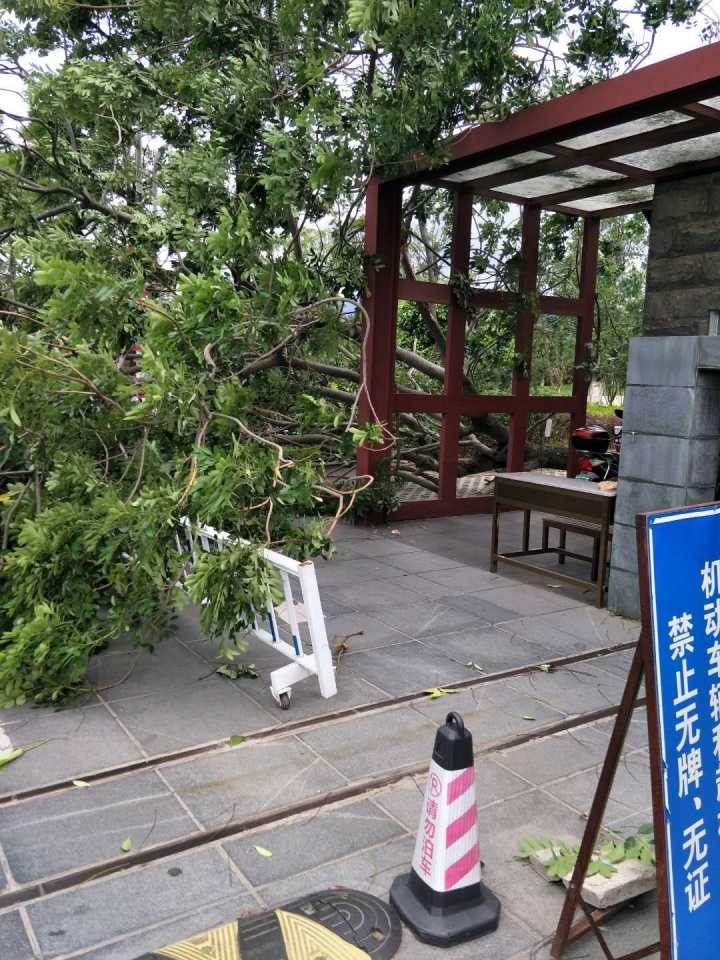
Fallen trees at Fuzhou University

Upon landfall in Lianjiang County on July 11, Typhoon Maria became the strongest July typhoon to make landfall in Fujian. Maria brought heavy rains and gusty winds to Fujian, Zhejiang, Jiangxi, and Hunan, affecting 1.424 million people and causing direct economic losses of CN¥4.16 billion (US$629 million). A peak rainfall total of 313 mm (12.3 in) was recorded at Lishui, Zhejiang, while a peak gust of 59.3 m/s (213 km/h; 133 mph) was observed at Sansha in Xiapu County, Fujian. Storm surge from Maria combined with the astronomical high tide to create tides exceeding warning levels by up to 0.93 m (3.1 ft). A tide gauge at Shacheng in Fuding, Fujian observed a record high tide of 4.4 m (14 ft) above mean sea level. Across Fujian and Zhejiang, about 37,300 hectares (92,000 acres) of cropland suffered damage, of which 2,500 hectares (6,200 acres) was completely destroyed. About 800 people in Zhejiang were rescued by emergency services, and 200 houses were damaged to varying degrees. In Fujian, 8,800 houses were damaged and another 300 were destroyed. Widespread power outages occurred in Fujian: over 86,000 customers in Lianjiang County and another 240,000 customers in Fuzhou lost power. Knee-deep flooding occurred in some residential areas in Fuzhou, where the police deployed 1,623 personnel to assist in flood control efforts. Fujian's water infrastructure suffered CN¥76 million (US$11 million) worth of damage. Communications in Fujian were severely disrupted, with 2,901 base stations taken offline and 315 km (196 mi) of networking cables damaged according to the Ministry of Industry and Information Technology. Authorities deployed 11,000 personnel across the province to conduct repairs. In Ningde, direct economic losses reached CN¥959 million (US$145 million). At least 40 houses in the city collapsed and 184 businesses were shut. Around 2,000 trees in Ningde were damaged by strong winds. In Ji'an, Jiangxi, the typhoon affected more than 24,200 people, damaged 1,703 hectares (4,210 acres) of cropland, and caused CN¥13.61 million (US$2.060 million) in losses. A person in Ji'an County was killed by a tree that was felled by the typhoon's winds.

== See also ==
- Other storms named Maria
- Other storms named Gardo
- Weather of 2018
- Tropical cyclones in 2018
- Typhoon Sinlaku (2002) – passed north of Taiwan and made landfall in Zhejiang in September
- Typhoon Saomai (2006) – most powerful typhoon on record to impact East China
- Typhoon Soulik (2013) – July system that hit northern Taiwan and Fujian
- Typhoon Nesat (2017) – another July system that hit Taiwan and Fujian
