= List of storms named Kompasu =

The name Kompasu (Japanese: コンパス, [kõ̞mpa̠sɨ̥]) has been used for four tropical cyclones in the western North Pacific Ocean. The name was contributed by Japan and refers to the constellation Circinus, the compass, in Japanese.

- Tropical Storm Kompasu (2004) (T0409, 12W, Julian) - Struck Sai Kung, Hong Kong.
- Typhoon Kompasu (2010) (T1007, 08W, Glenda) - Skirted Okinawa before making landfall in Seoul, South Korea.
- Tropical Storm Kompasu (2016) (T1611, 13W) - Affected East Japan.
- Severe Tropical Storm Kompasu (2021) (T2118, 24W, Maring) - a very large and deadly tropical cyclone that carved a path of destruction from the Philippines, Taiwan, and southeast China.

The name Kompasu was retired following the 2021 Pacific typhoon season and was replaced with Tokei (Japanese: トケイ, [to̞ke̞ː]), which refers to the constellation Horologium, the clock, in Japanese.
