= Typhoon Kompasu (2010) =

Pacific typhoon in 2010

Typhoon Kompasu (Glenda)
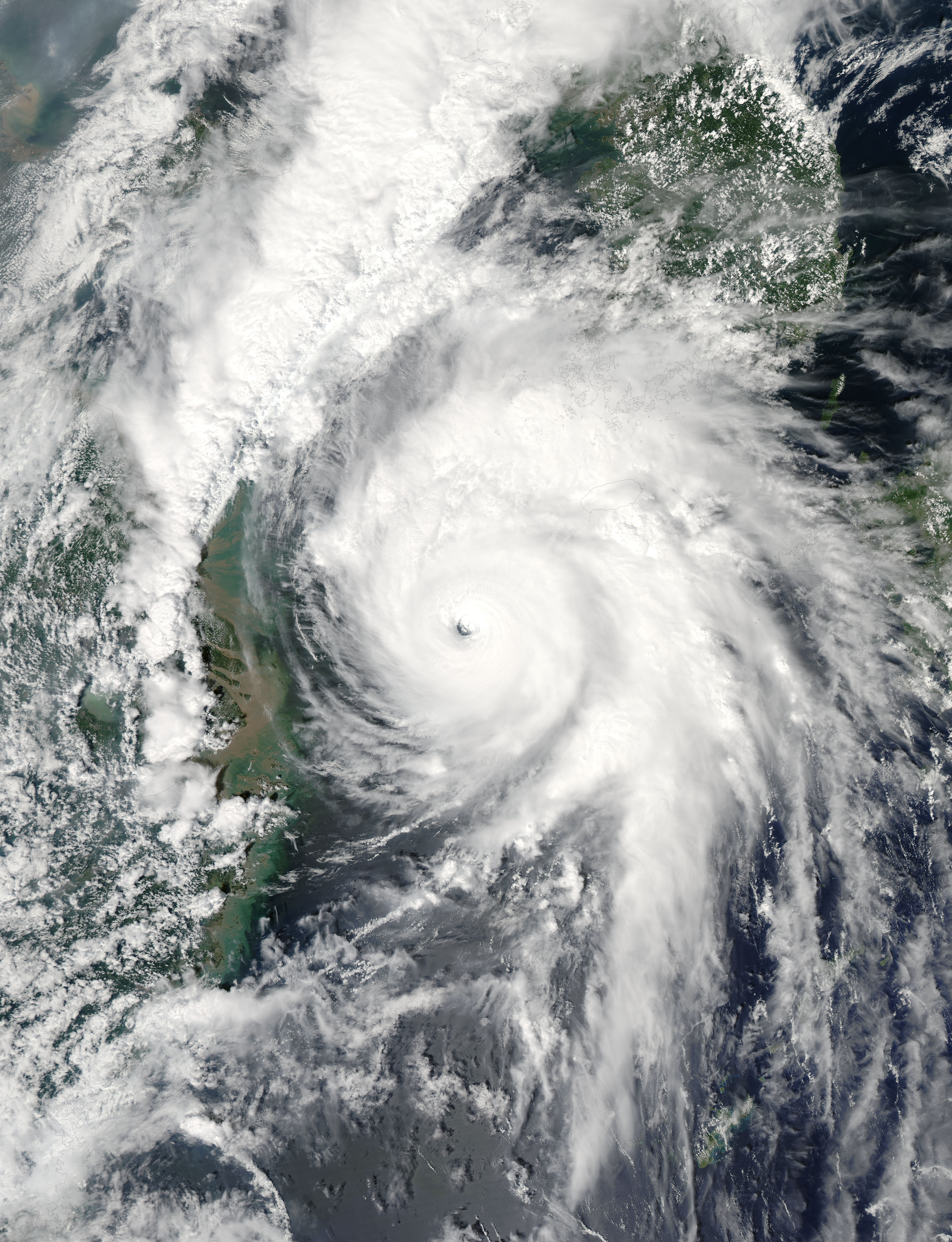
- Typhoon Kompasu approaching the Korean Peninsula on September 1

Meteorological history
- Formed: August 28, 2010
- Extratropical: September 3, 2010
- Dissipated: September 4, 2010

Typhoon
- 10-minute sustained (JMA)
- Highest winds: 150 km/h (90 mph)
- Lowest pressure: 960 hPa (mbar); 28.35 inHg

Category 3-equivalent typhoon
- 1-minute sustained (SSHWS/JTWC)
- Highest winds: 195 km/h (120 mph)
- Lowest pressure: 944 hPa (mbar); 27.88 inHg

Overall effects
- Fatalities: 29 total
- Damage: $58.3 million (2010 USD)
- Areas affected: China, Japan, South Korea, North Korea, Russian Far East, Alaska
- IBTrACS
- Part of the 2010 Pacific typhoon season

Typhoon Kompasu, (Note: The name Kompasu (Japanese: コンパス, [kõ̞mpa̠sɨ̥]) was contributed by Japan and refers to the constellation Circinus, the compass, in Japanese.) known in the Philippines as Typhoon Glenda, was a strong tropical cyclone that moved along Okinawa, Japan and west coast of the Korean Peninsula before striking the Seoul Metropolitan Area in early-September 2010. It was the first significant system to directly strike the Seoul Metropolitan since Typhoon Prapiroon in 2000 and the strongest typhoon to directly impact the area since Tropical Storm Janis in 1995.

== Meteorological history ==
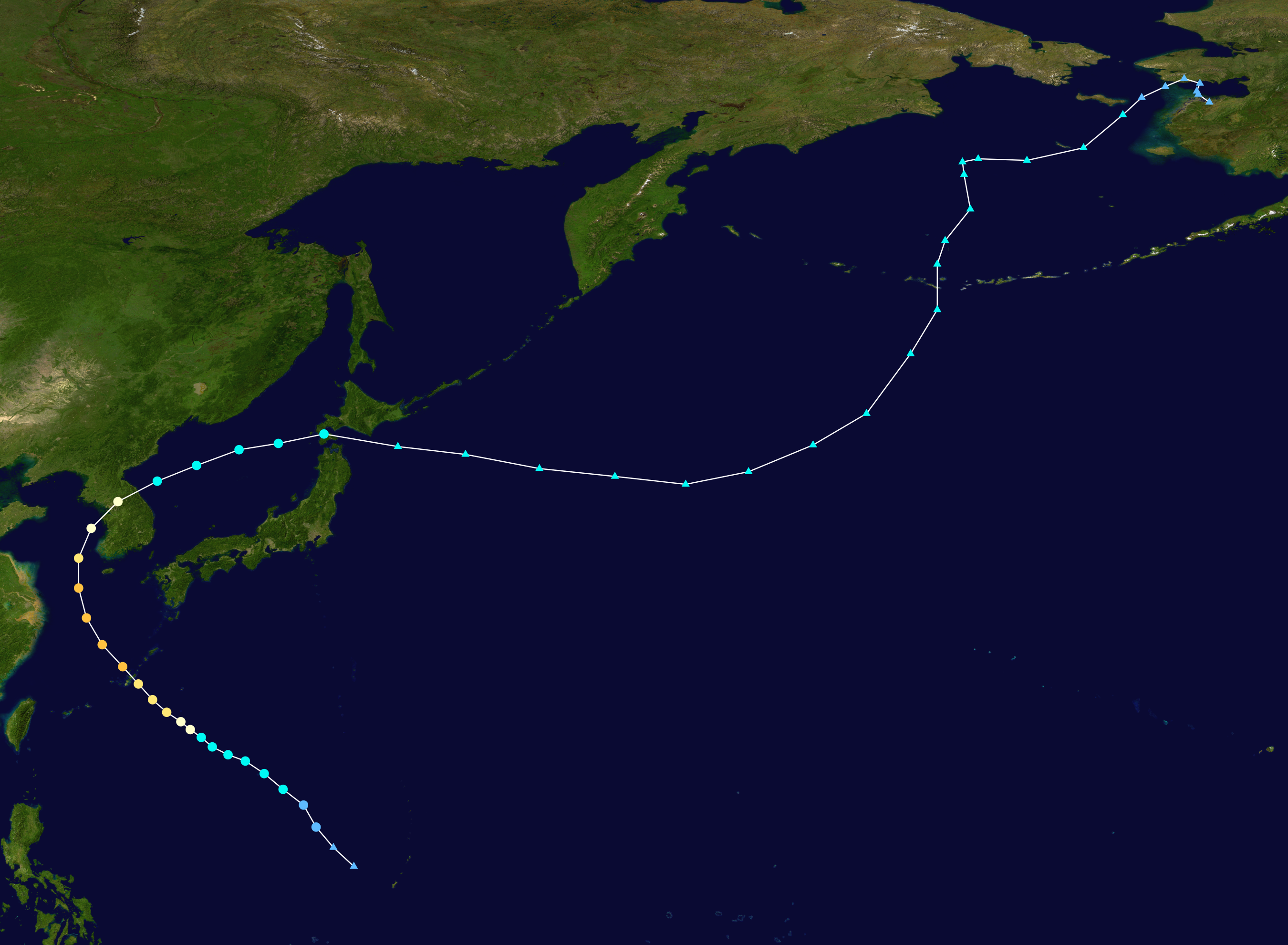
Map plotting the storm's track and intensity, according to the Saffir–Simpson scale Map key Saffir–Simpson scale Tropical depression (≤38 mph, ≤62 km/h) Tropical storm (39–73 mph, 63–118 km/h) Category 1 (74–95 mph, 119–153 km/h) Category 2 (96–110 mph, 154–177 km/h) Category 3 (111–129 mph, 178–208 km/h) Category 4 (130–156 mph, 209–251 km/h) Category 5 (≥157 mph, ≥252 km/h) Unknown Storm type Tropical cyclone Subtropical cyclone Extratropical cyclone, remnant low, tropical disturbance, or monsoon depression

The tropical disturbance that was to become Typhoon Kompasu was first analyzed by the Joint Typhoon Warning Center on August 25, as a tropical disturbance developing out of a surface trough of low pressure that was located near Chuuk State. Over the next couple of days, the disturbance moved towards the northwest as it moved under the steering influence of a deep subtropical ridge of high pressure. During August 28, the disturbance developed a low level circulation which rapidly consolidated throughout that day. This led to the Japan Meteorological Agency and the JTWC designating it as Tropical Depression 08W during that day before the JTWC reported that the depression had intensified into a tropical storm. During the next day the PAGASA reported that the Tropical Depression had moved into their area of responsibility and subsequently named it Tropical Storm Glenda. Later that day the JMA also reported that Glenda had intensified into tropical storm and named it as Kompasu.

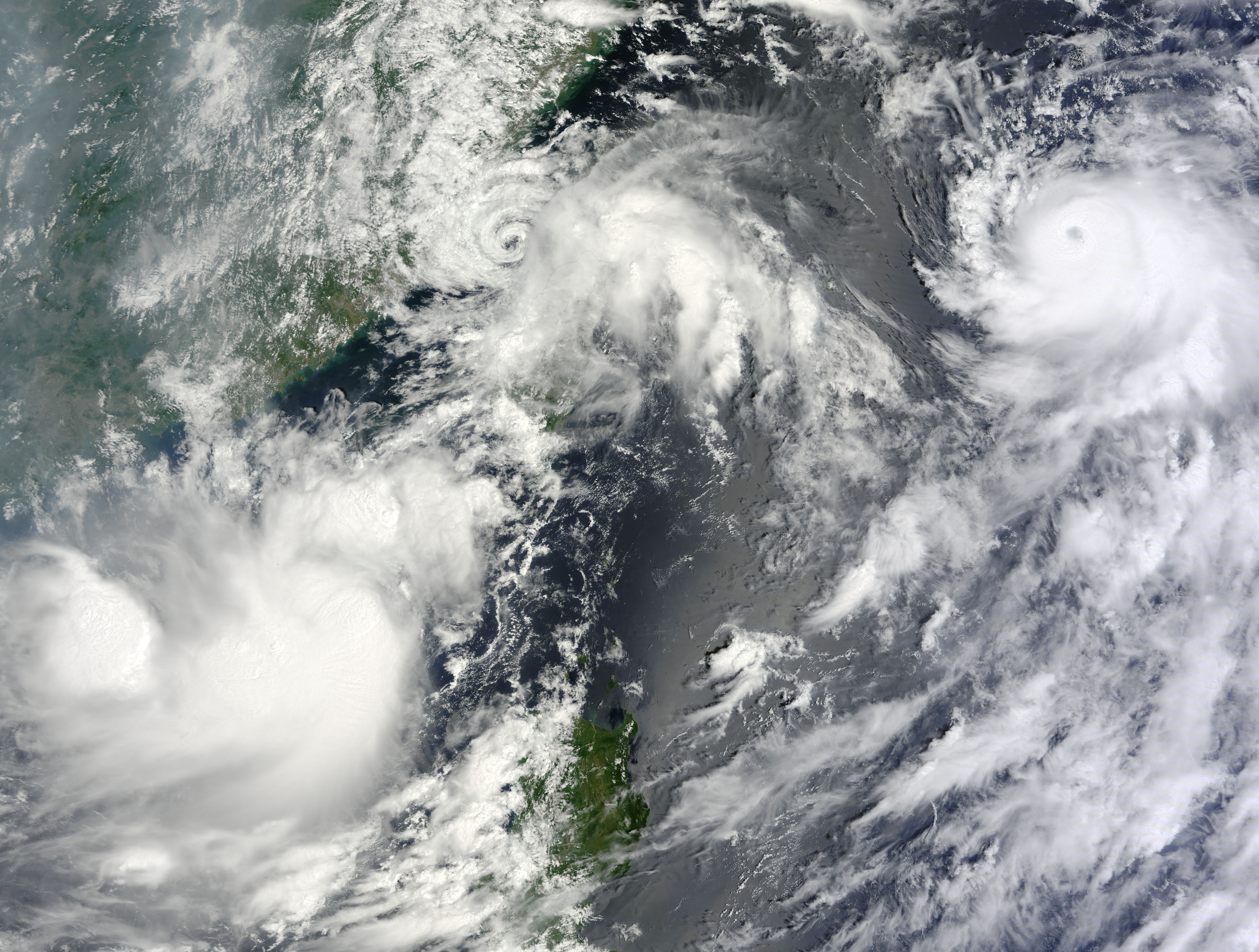
Lionrock (left), Namtheun (middle) and Kompasu (right) on August 31

Early on August 30, the JTWC reported that Kompasu had developed an eye feature and had intensified into a typhoon. However the JMA did not follow suit until 1800 UTC, that day after the JTWC had assessed the intensity of Kompasu at 165 km/h (100 mph). During the next day as Kompasu passed over Okinawa both the JTWC and the JMA reported that Kompasu had peaked with windspeeds of 185 km/h, (115 mph) and 150 km/h, (90 mph) respectively.

The Japan Meteorological Agency's Regional Specialized Meteorological Center in Tokyo, Japan uses the Typhoon Committees Tropical Cyclone Intensity Scale which is based on 10-minute sustained winds for its tropical cyclone tracking information, while the Joint Typhoon Warning Center uses 1-minute sustained winds. The conversion factor between the two is 1.14. The JMA's peak intensity for Kompasu was 150 km/h, (90 mph) 10-minute sustained, or 170 km/h, (105 mph) 1-minute sustained. The JTWC's peak intensity for Kompasu was 185 km/h, (115 mph) 1-minute sustained, or 165 km/h (100 mph) 10-minute sustained.

The storm made landfall near Seoul on September 2 at 6:35 AM local time.

== Preparations and impact ==
=== Okinawa ===
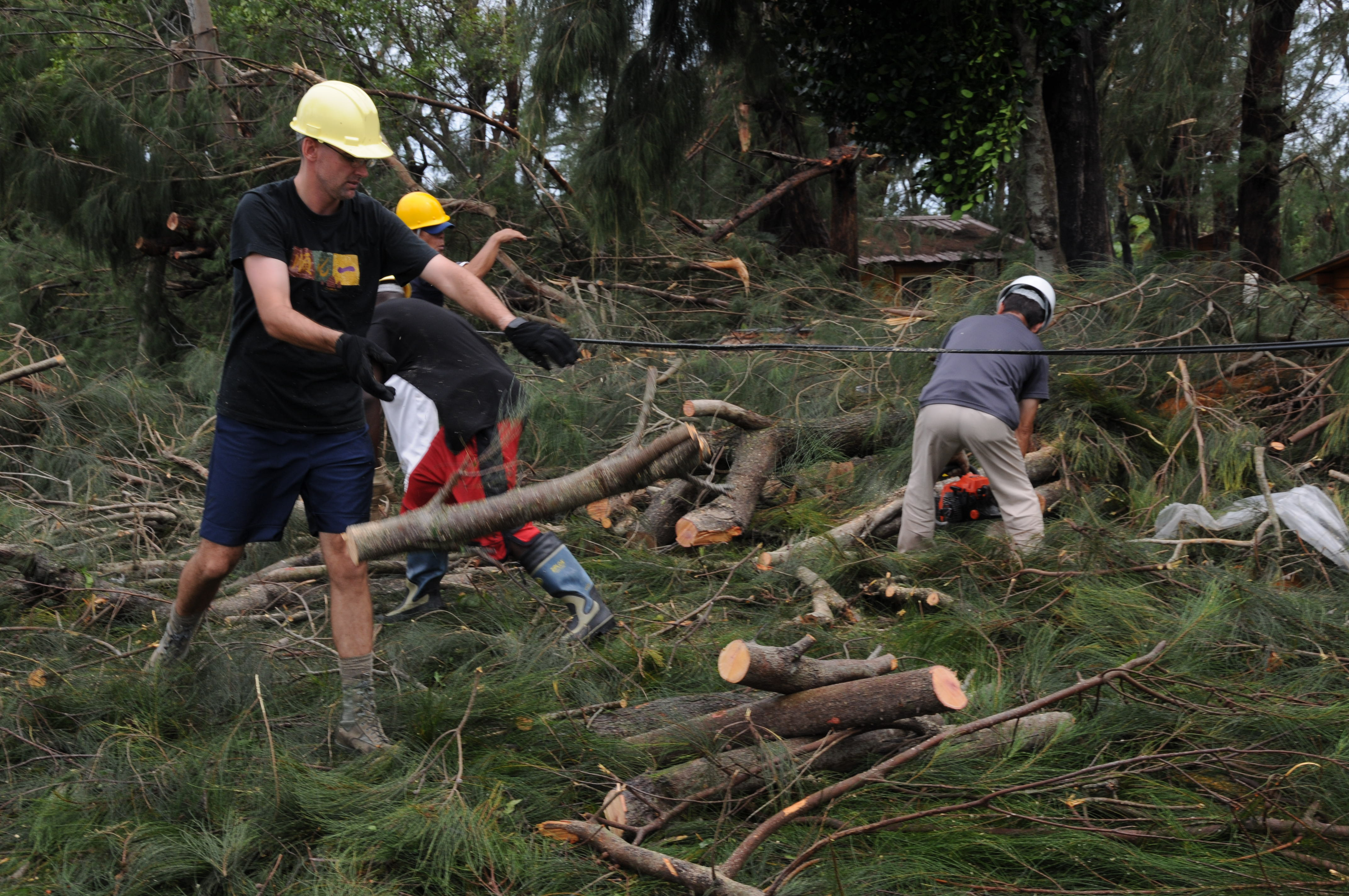
Okuma Recreation Facility staff members cleaning up debris left in the wake of Typhoon Kompasu

On August 28, the United States Kadena Air Base in Okinawa began preparing for what was then Tropical Storm 08W. Tropical Cyclone Condition of Readiness (TCCOR) level three was issued the following morning. By August 30, forecasts showed that a strengthening storm would strike the area, possibly bringing winds in excess of 130 km/h (81 mph). Following this, the TCCOR level was increased to two. For the first time in over three years, TCCOR level one was declared on August 31. Military personnel and residents across the island were urged to complete their preparations and remain indoors for the duration of the typhoon. During the storm's passage on August 31, the highest warning level, TCCOR One-E (emergency) was declared. Following Kompasu's passage, the emergency warning was changed to recovery as conditions improved.

Throughout Okinawa, Kompasu brought strong winds and heavy rains, leaving an estimated 32,000 residences without power. The highest rainfall total was measured in Motobu at 4.96 in (126 mm). Winds in excess of 150 km/h (93 mph) felled a 300-year-old tree. The 17 m (56 ft) Sion Pine Tree was the last of its kind on the island and was once the symbol of the northern Okinawa Region. The Okuma Recreation Facility sustained substantial damage and was closed to the public for at least a week. According to United States Air Force captain Adam Vaccarezza, concrete towers fell during the storm. Although Kompasu was a strong typhoon when it passed over Okinawa, no loss of life took place; however, five people were injured. Some homes sustained roof damage across the region, prompting a few evacuations. Additionally, Kompasu resulted in the cancellation of 432 flights to and from the island chain, stranding 57,126 people.

=== People's Republic of China ===
On August 31 at 12:40 CST, the Zhejiang Meteorological Observatory in Zhoushan City, Zhejiang issued an orange typhoon warning signal, and estimated that at midnight on the same day, the wind from the sea along the coast of Zhoushan would gradually intensify to 8–10 grade, and from the morning of September 1, will continue to increase from 10 to 12, and near the sea winds would exceed 12 grade. Zhoushan City schools delayed the beginning of the school term, to ensure the safety of students and teachers.

In Jiangsu Province, at 16:00 CST on August 31, the Jiangsu Province Meteorological Observatory issued a blue typhoon warning signal, and within the next 24 hours, Nantong, Yancheng, Lianyungang and other coastal areas received sea wind gusts of a 9–10 grade average.

On the same day at 17:00 CST, the Shanghai Meteorological Observatory issued a blue typhoon warning signal for the Shanghai region, and expected that after midnight, winds would reach 6–8 grade, and that along the Yangtze River estuary, coastal winds would reach an intensity of 8–10 grade. On September 1, the Shanghai Municipal Government announced that schools would be closed on that day, whilst at Shanghai Honqiao and Pudong airports, flight times were adjusted for passengers' safety.

In Shandong Province, on August 31, at 17:00 CST, the Shandong Province Meteorological observatory at Rizhao City issued a blue typhoon warning signal, and expected offshore wind intensities to reach 7–9 grade.

=== South Korea ===
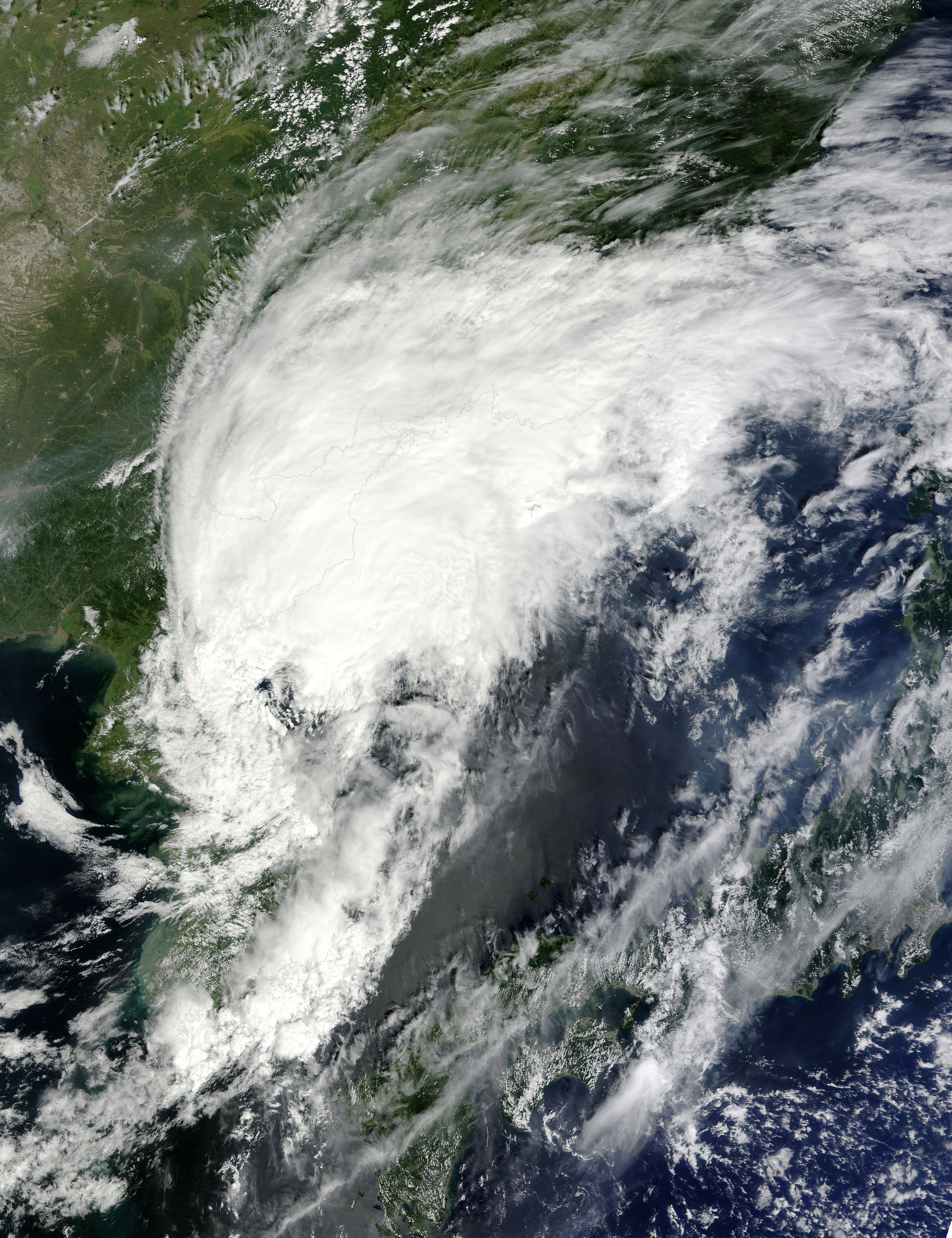
Tropical Storm Kompasu over South Korea on September 2

Throughout South Korea, high winds and torrential rains cut power to an estimated 1.56 million residences. According to the Korea Electric Power Corporation, the power outages cost 1.59 billion won (US$1.34 million). Due to the relatively fast movement of the storm, much of the damage was sustained by intense winds which were recorded up to 188 km/h (117 mph), the sixth highest wind speed ever recorded in the country. The heaviest rains fell in Ganghwa, where 131.5 mm (5.18 in) was recorded. In the capital city of Seoul, portions of the subway system were damaged, creating widespread travel issues. Three lines of the subway system had interrupted service during the morning hours of September 3. In Incheon, the Munhak Stadium sustained substantial damage as gale-force winds shredded the roof of the structure. Damage to the stadium reached 10 billion won (US$8.3 million). According to Korean officials, four people were killed by debris blown around by the storm. A fifth, indirect fatality from electrocution was later linked to the storm in Mokpo.

Roughly 10,000 hectares (25,000 acres) of agricultural land was inundated by the storm, resulting in widespread losses. At least 80,000 chickens were killed by the storm. In South Chungcheong, 7,650 Anmyeon pine trees, regarded as the best type of tree for lumber in the region, were destroyed. Of these trees, 1,750 were more than 50 years old and averaged 24 m (79 ft) in height.

According to the catastrophe modeler Eqecat, the storm was likely to cause $1–3 billion (USD) in damage throughout the country. However, as of September 3, officials have estimated that damage has reached 68.52 billion won (US$58.3 million). In the wake of the storm, the Korean disaster agency stated that 29,000 government officials, soldiers and volunteers were working on clearing debris and restoring power. By the evening of September 2, electricity had been restored to 98% of the households affected. Roughly $22 million (USD) was set aside as relief money for residents affected by the storm. The National Tax Service decided to allow extra time on deadlines for people to recover.

=== North Korea ===
On September 1, North Korean media broadcast a typhoon warning, informing North Koreans to prepare for heavy rainfall. According to the Korean Central News Agency, Thaetan, Suan, Sungho and Siwon Counties were affected from September 1–2, and within Pyongyang, Mangyongdae and Samsok districts received 80 mm and 65 mm of rain respectively. Areas within Kangwon, South Hamgyong and South Hwanghae provinces had winds of 10–18 metres per second. Although the Government of North Korea withheld information regarding loss of life, a South Korean humanitarian group stated that dozens of people were killed across the country. Severe floods and landslides brought on by the storm destroyed nearly 9,000 structures and flooded 30,000 hectares of land.

== See also ==
- Other tropical cyclones named Kompasu
- Other tropical cyclones named Glenda
- Typhoon Danas (2013)
- Tropical Storm Nakri (2014)
- Typhoon Rammasun (2014)
- Typhoon Haishen (2020)
- Typhoon Hinnamnor (2022)
- Typhoon Khanun (2023)
