= List of storms named Inday =

The name Inday has been used for seven tropical cyclones in the Philippine Area of Responsibility by PAGASA in the Western Pacific Ocean.

- Typhoon Halong (2002) (T0207, 10W, Inday) – struck Japan.
- Severe Tropical Storm Bopha (2006) (T0609, 10W, Inday) – struck Taiwan.
- Typhoon Fanapi (2010) (T1011, 12W, Inday) – deadly and destructive typhoon that struck Taiwan.
- Severe Tropical Storm Nakri (2014) (T1412, 12W, Inday) – passed through the Ryukyu Islands and made landfall in South Korea.
- Severe Tropical Storm Ampil (2018) (T1810, 12W, Inday) – caused moderate damage in the Ryukyu Islands and China in July 2018
- Typhoon Muifa (2022) (T2212, 14W, Inday) – made a strong landfall in Shanghai, China
- Typhoon Bavi (2026) (T2609, 09W, Inday) – a very strong typhoon that battered the Mariana Islands and China, as well as caused heavy flooding across the Philippines.

| Preceded by Henry | Pacific typhoon season names Inday | Succeeded by Josie |
