= List of storms named Glenda =

The name Glenda has been used for eleven tropical cyclones worldwide: five in the Eastern Pacific Ocean; three in the Philippines by PAGASA in the Western Pacific Ocean; twice in the Australian region of the Southern Hemisphere; once in the South-West Indian Ocean.

In the Eastern Pacific:

- Hurricane Glenda (1963)
- Tropical Storm Glenda (1965)
- Hurricane Glenda (1969)
- Tropical Storm Glenda (1973)
- Tropical Storm Glenda (1977)

In the Western Pacific: The name has been used for three tropical cyclones in the Philippine Area of Responsibility by PAGASA. It replaced the name Gloria after it was retired following the 2002 Pacific typhoon season.

- Typhoon Kaemi (2006) (T0605, 06W, Glenda) – struck Taiwan and China.
- Typhoon Kompasu (2010) (T1007, 08W, Glenda) – struck the Korean Peninsula and Japan.
- Typhoon Rammasun (2014) (T1409, 09W, Glenda) – a Category 5 super typhoon that impacted the Philippines and China.

PAGASA retired the name after the 2014 storm and replaced it with Gardo.

In the Australian region:

- Cyclone Glenda (1967)
- Cyclone Glenda (2006) – Category 5 severe tropical cyclone that made landfall in Western Australia.

The name was retired from future use in the region after the 2006 cyclone.

In the South-West Indian Ocean:

- Severe Tropical Storm Glenda (2015)
