= Typhoon Halong (2002) =

Pacific typhoon in 2002

Typhoon Halong (Inday)
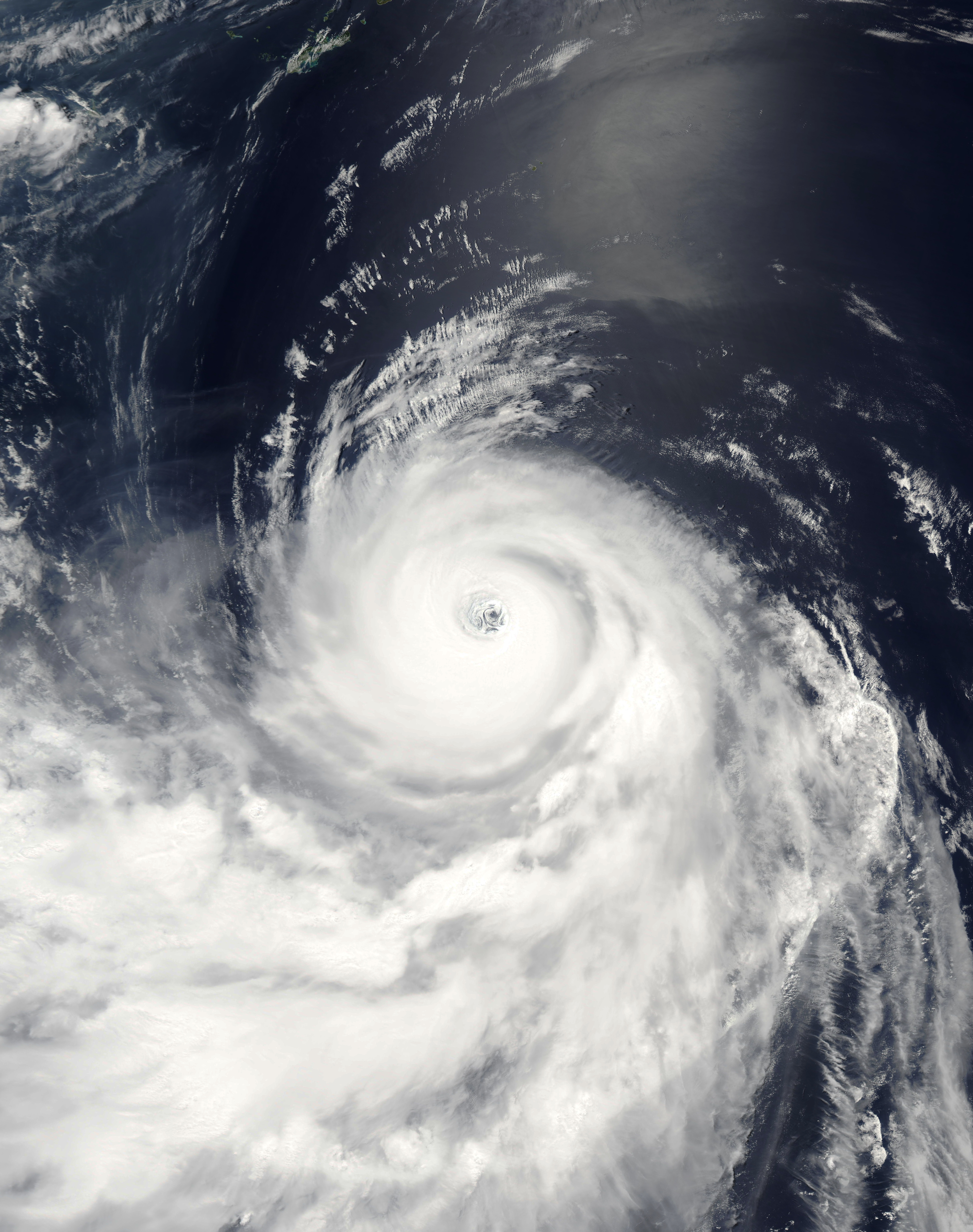
- Typhoon Halong at peak intensity on July 13

Meteorological history
- Formed: July 5, 2002
- Extratropical: July 16, 2002
- Dissipated: July 19, 2002

Very strong typhoon
- 10-minute sustained (JMA)
- Highest winds: 155 km/h (100 mph)
- Lowest pressure: 945 hPa (mbar); 27.91 inHg

Category 4-equivalent super typhoon
- 1-minute sustained (SSHWS/JTWC)
- Highest winds: 250 km/h (155 mph)
- Lowest pressure: 904 hPa (mbar); 26.70 inHg

Overall effects
- Fatalities: 10 total
- Damage: $89.8 million (2002 USD)
- Areas affected: Guam, Philippines, Japan
- IBTrACS
- Part of the 2002 Pacific typhoon season

Typhoon Halong, (Note: The name Halong (Vietnamese: Hạ Long, [haː˧˨ʔ lawŋ͡m˧˧]) was contributed by Vietnam and refers to Hạ Long Bay in Vietnamese.) known in the Philippines as Super Typhoon Inday, passed just south of Guam one week after Typhoon Chataan struck the island and left heavy damage. The seventh named storm of the season, Halong developed near the same location as Chataan on July 5 near the Marshall Islands. For much of its duration, the storm moved toward the northwest, gradually intensifying. Early on July 10, Halong passed just south of Guam as a tropical storm, producing high waves and gusty winds on the island. The storm disrupted relief efforts from Chataan, causing additional power outages but little damage.

After affecting Guam, Halong quickly strengthened and reached its peak winds on July 12. The Joint Typhoon Warning Center estimated peak 1-minute winds of 250 km/h (160 mph), while the Japan Meteorological Agency estimated 10‑minute winds of 155 km/h (96 mph). Subsequently, the typhoon weakened greatly while curving to the northeast, although it still passed near Okinawa with strong winds that left widespread power outages. Halong struck southeastern Japan, dropping heavy rainfall and producing strong winds that left $89.8 million (¥10.3 billion 2002 JPY) in damage. (Note: All damage totals are in 2002 United States dollars unless otherwise noted.) There was one death in the country and nine injuries. Halong became extratropical on July 16 and dissipated the next day. The typhoon influenced the monsoon trough in the Philippines, contributing to flooding and deaths in the country.

== Meteorological history ==
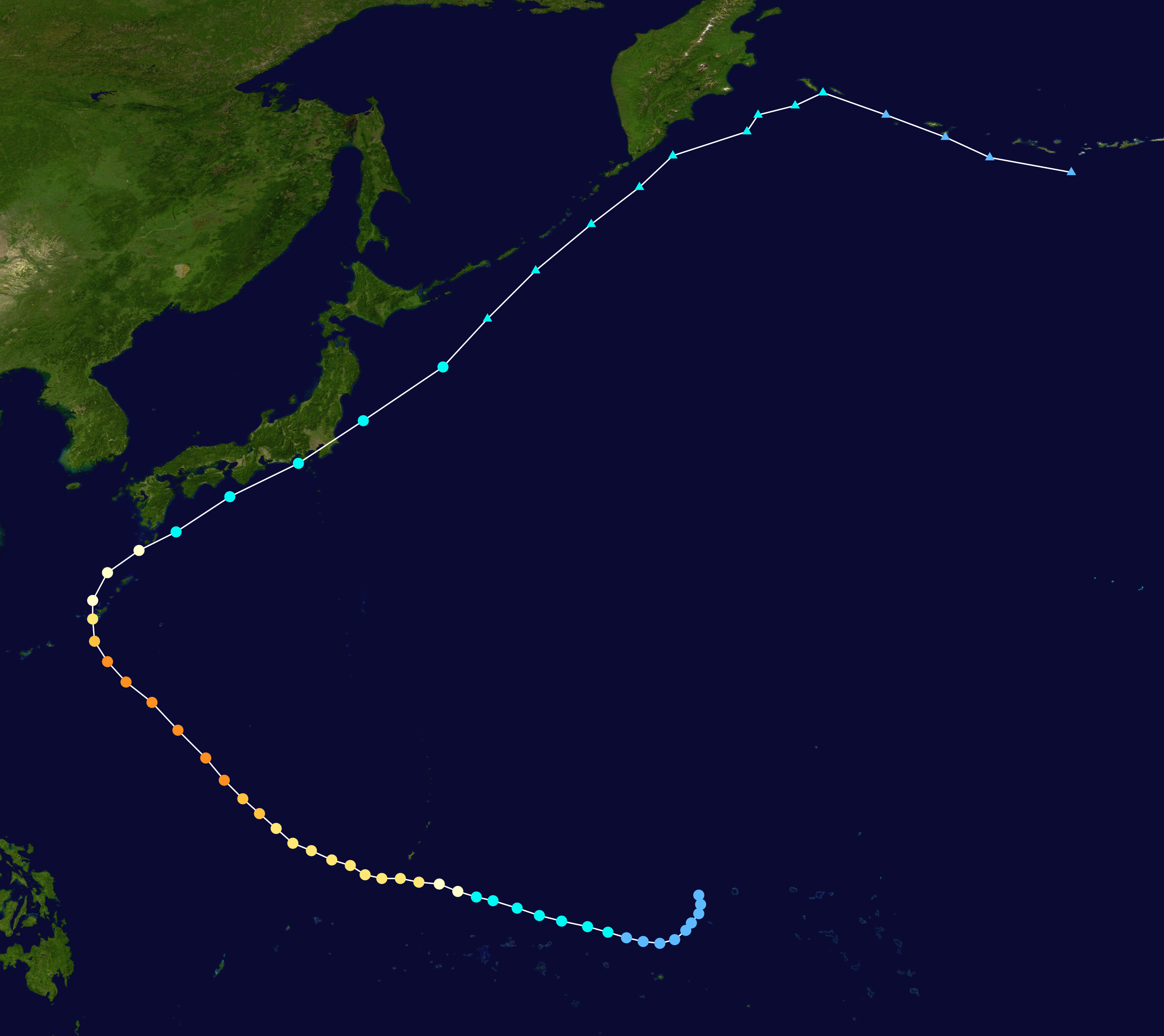
Map plotting the storm's track and intensity, according to the Saffir–Simpson scale Map key Saffir–Simpson scale Tropical depression (≤38 mph, ≤62 km/h) Tropical storm (39–73 mph, 63–118 km/h) Category 1 (74–95 mph, 119–153 km/h) Category 2 (96–110 mph, 154–177 km/h) Category 3 (111–129 mph, 178–208 km/h) Category 4 (130–156 mph, 209–251 km/h) Category 5 (≥157 mph, ≥252 km/h) Unknown Storm type Tropical cyclone Subtropical cyclone Extratropical cyclone, remnant low, tropical disturbance, or monsoon depression

In early July, a circulation with an area of convection developed along the monsoon trough near Enewetak Atoll. The system remained nearly stationary, tracking slowly to the southwest. Gradually organizing, the system developed into a tropical depression on July 6 over the Marshall Islands. Without having issued a tropical cyclone formation alert, the Joint Typhoon Warning Center (JTWC) (Note: The Joint Typhoon Warning Center is a joint United States Navy – United States Air Force task force that issues tropical cyclone warnings for the western Pacific Ocean and other regions.) initiated advisories on Tropical Depression 10W at 0000 UTC on July 7. Late that day, the Japan Meteorological Agency (JMA) (Note: The Japan Meteorological Agency is the official Regional Specialized Meteorological Center for the western Pacific Ocean.) upgraded the depression to Tropical Storm Halong near the island of Chuuk in the Federated States of Micronesia. By that time, the storm was moving west-northwestward, steered by a ridge to the north. Halong slowly intensified, although it continued to develop deep convection that wrapped into the center. Early on July 9, the JMA upgraded the storm to a severe tropical storm. At 1200 UTC that day, the JTWC upgraded Halong to typhoon status about 405 km (252 mi) east-southeast of Guam.

While moving toward Guam, Halong became better organized, developing an eye and well-defined rainbands. After a brief turn more toward the west, the storm passed about 140 km (87 mi) south of the southern tip of Guam at 0200 UTC on July 10; at the time, the JTWC estimated 1‑minute sustained winds of 165 km/h (103 mph), although the JMA had maintained Halong as a tropical storm until upgrading to a typhoon at 1800 UTC that day. An approaching trough increased shear over Halong, and a weak ridge to the north restricted outflow; this briefly prevented significant intensification after the convection decreased. Late on July 11, the thunderstorms increased, and restrengthening resumed. Late on July 12, the JMA assessed Halong as reaching peak 10‑minute sustained winds of 155 km/h (96 mph). Around that time, the typhoon entered the area of the Philippine Atmospheric, Geophysical and Astronomical Services Administration (PAGASA), which gave it the local name Typhoon Inday. Early on July 13, the JTWC upgraded Halong to a super typhoon after the storm developed a well-defined eye 63 km (39 mi) in diameter. Shortly thereafter, the agency estimated peak 1‑minute sustained winds of 250 km/h (155 mph).

At its peak intensity, Typhoon Halong had gale-force winds that extended 415 km (258 mi) northeast of the center. It was continuing to the northwest toward Okinawa, and threatened to strike the island at near peak intensity. However, the typhoon began rapidly weakening due to increasing wind shear, and the eye quickly deteriorated. At around 1200 UTC on July 14, Halong made landfall on Okinawa with 10‑minute winds of 130 km/h (81 mph). Around that time, the typhoon moved through a weakness in the ridge, turning to the north and later accelerating to the northeast. The combination of cool, dry air, and the persistent wind shear removed the convection from the center by early on July 15, weakening Halong to tropical storm status. Later that day, the JTWC discontinued advisories while the storm was approaching Japan, and the agency classified Halong as extratropical. The JMA continued tracking the storm, and Halong struck both the Izu and Bōsō peninsulas along Honshu. Late on July 16, the JMA classified Halong as extratropical, and shortly thereafter the storm dissipated over the Kuril Islands. The extratropical remnants of Halong moved out of the basin late on July 19, just prior dissipating.

== Preparations and impact ==
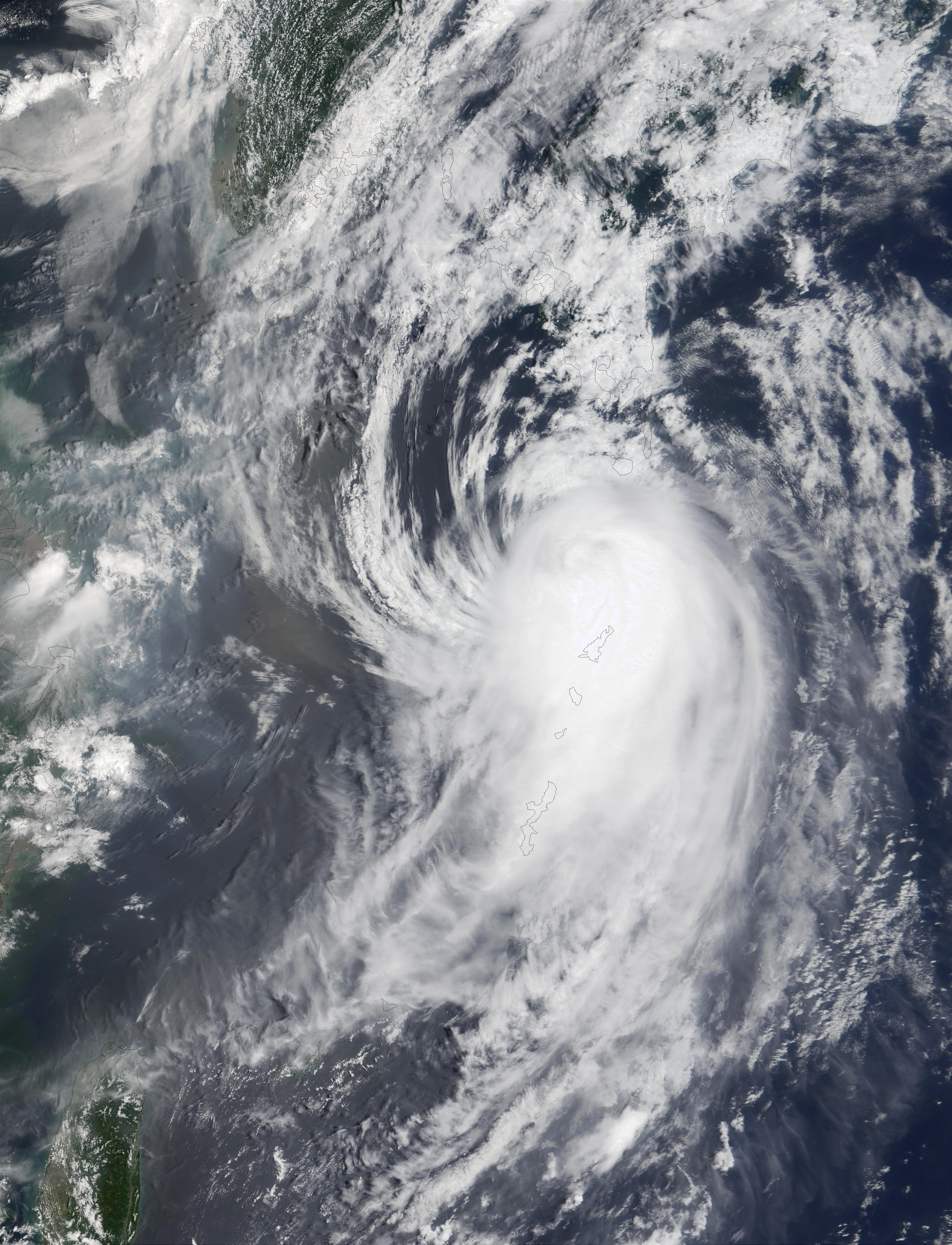
Typhoon Halong approaching Japan on July 15

Only a week after Typhoon Chataan struck Guam and left $60 million in damage, Typhoon Halong also threatened the island, although it veered to the south in the day before it would have struck. Due to the storm, all flights were canceled in Guam and the Northern Marianas Islands, and officials advised residents in low-lying areas to evacuate. While passing to the south, Halong produced waves as high as 6 m (20 ft) in Inarajan. The waves left beach erosion along Guam's southern coast, and were higher than during Chataan's passage. The typhoon produced peak sustained winds of 69 km/h (43 mph), with gusts to 90 km/h (56 mph); both observations were recorded at Guam's National Weather Service. Damage on the island was estimated at $40,000. The storm disrupted work to repair damage from Chataan. Portions of the island, including Guam Memorial Hospital, had their power restored after Chataan, only to lose electricity during Halong. The additional damage caused by Halong contributed to Governor Carl T.C. Gutierrez declaring the island as a state of emergency on July 22, which activated the Guam National Guard.

While passing northeast of the Philippines, Halong enhanced the monsoon, and combined with the effects from previous typhoons Rammasun and Chataan, as well as Severe Tropical Storm Nakri, there were 85 deaths, with 45 people injured in the Philippines. About ten of the deaths were estimated to have been caused by Halong. The combined damage in the country totaled $10.3 million (₱522 million 2002 PHP). (Note: The total was originally reported in Philippine pesos. Total converted via the Oanda Corporation website.)

In Japan, Halong dropped heavy rainfall that peaked at 362 mm (14.3 in) in Nagano Prefecture. The highest rainfall in Okinawa was 258 mm (10.2 in). Near Tokyo, a station recorded winds of 112 km/h (70 mph), although winds gusted to 183 km/h (114 mph) at Kadena Air Base on Okinawa. In the Ryukyu Islands of Japan, including Okinawa, Halong left more than 48,800 houses without power due to the strong winds. Officials canceled bus service in Naze, Kagoshima during the storm. Throughout the country, the typhoon destroyed six houses and damaged 223 others to varying degrees. Halong also flooded 301 houses, forcing about 4,000 people to evacuate their homes, many along rivers. Officials canceled 54 airline flights, 10 of them international, and due to the storm, 171 schools were closed. In Sendai, Halong damaged roads in 550 locations and railroads in seven locations. Nine levees were breached, and there were at least 270 landslides. Damage totaled $89.8 million (¥10.3 billion 2002 JPY) across the country, mostly from agriculture. (Note: The total was originally reported in Yen. Total converted via the Oanda Corporation website.) During its passage, the typhoon injured nine people, one of them severely, and there was one death.

== See also ==
- Other tropical cyclones named Halong
- Other tropical cyclones named Inday
- Tropical cyclones in 2002
- Typhoon Neoguri (2014)
