= List of storms named Josie =

The name Josie has been used to name five tropical cyclones: three in the Philippine Area of Responsibility in the West Pacific Ocean, one in the South Pacific Ocean, and one in the South-West Indian Ocean.

In the Western Pacific, it replaced the name Jose on PAGASA's naming lists:

- Tropical Depression Josie (2018; 13W) – enhanced the southwest monsoon in Luzon.
- Typhoon Nanmadol (2022) (T2214, 16W, Josie) – a Category 4-equivalent super typhoon that made landfall in Japan, causing over 100 injuries.
- Tropical Storm Haishen (2026) (T2611, Josie) – a weak tropical storm that is not recognized by the JTWC.

In the South Pacific:

- Cyclone Josie (2018) – a Category 1 tropical cyclone that caused heavy rainfall in Fiji.

The name Josie was retired following the 2017–18 season, being replaced by Jo.

In the South-West Indian:

- Cyclone Josie (1997) – a tropical cyclone that contributed to the 1997 Mozambique floods.

Preceded by Inday	Pacific typhoon season names Josie	Succeeded by Kiyapo
