= List of storms named Gardo =

The name Gardo has been used for three tropical cyclones in the Philippine Area of Responsibility by PAGASA in the Western Pacific Ocean. It replaced the name Glenda after it was retired following the 2014 Pacific typhoon season.

- Typhoon Maria (2018) (T1808, 10W, Gardo) – a Category 5 super typhoon which affected the Marianas, the Ryukyu Islands, Taiwan and China.
- Tropical Depression Gardo (2022) (13W, Gardo) – Formed over the Philippine Sea but later absorbed by the circulation around Typhoon Hinnamnor.
- Tropical Storm Higos (2026) (T2608, 08W, Gardo) – a weak tropical storm that formed at sea passed near the coast of Japan.

Preceded by Francisco	Pacific typhoon season names (Philippines); Gardo	Succeeded by Henry
