= TransAsia Airways Flight 222 =

2014 aviation accident in Taiwan

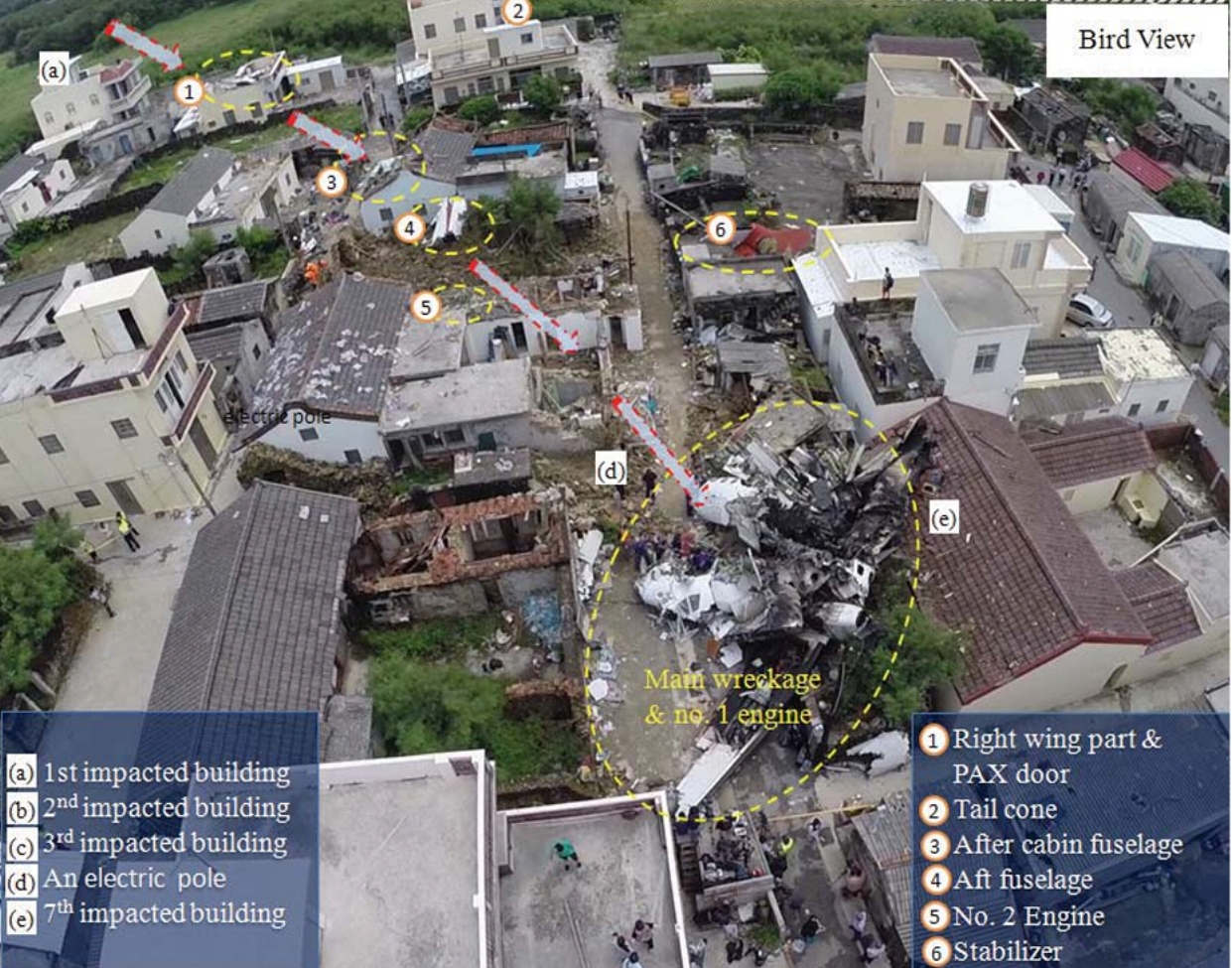
- Aerial view of the crash site

Accident
- Date: 23 July 2014
- Summary: Controlled flight into terrain due to pilot error in inclement weather
- Site: Xixi village, near Magong Airport, Huxi, Penghu, Taiwan; 23.585°N 119.639°E
- Total fatalities: 48
- Total injuries: 15

Aircraft
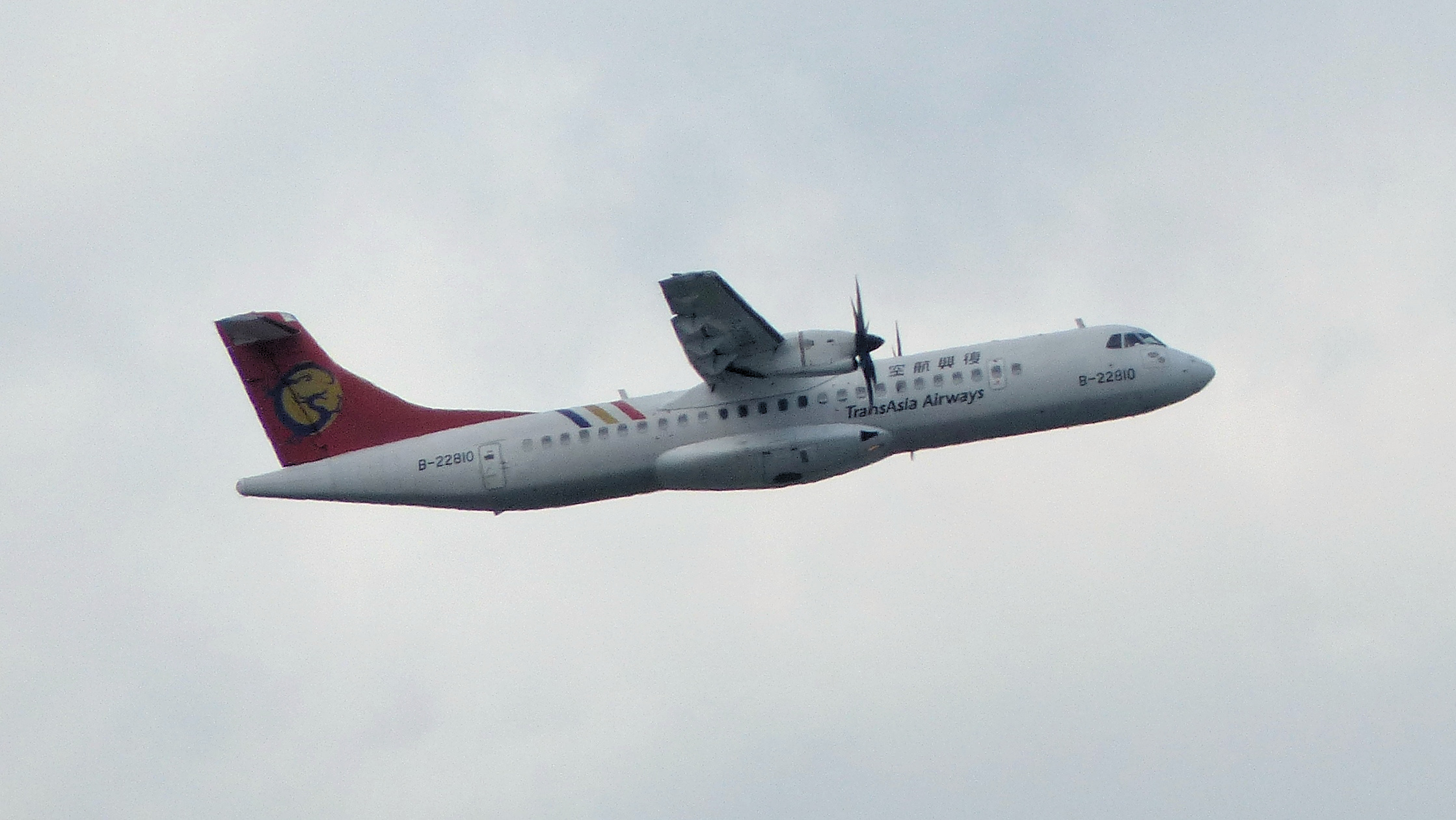
- B-22810, the aircraft involved, seen 5 days before the accident
- Aircraft type: ATR 72-212A
- Operator: TransAsia Airways
- IATA flight No.: GE222
- ICAO flight No.: TNA222
- Call sign: TRANSASIA 222
- Registration: B-22810
- Flight origin: Kaohsiung International Airport, Taiwan
- Destination: Magong Airport, Taiwan
- Occupants: 58
- Passengers: 54
- Crew: 4
- Fatalities: 48
- Injuries: 10
- Survivors: 10

Ground casualties
- Ground injuries: 5

TransAsia Airways Flight 222 was a scheduled domestic passenger flight operated by TransAsia Airways from Kaohsiung, Taiwan, to Magong, Penghu Island. On 23 July 2014, the ATR 72-500 twin turboprop operating the route crashed into buildings during approach to land in bad weather at Magong Airport. Among the 58 people on board, only 10 survived.

An investigation by the Taiwanese Aviation Safety Council found that the pilots intentionally descended below the minimum descent altitude and that the captain was overconfident, resulting in pilot error.

== Accident ==
Location of the departure (Kaohsiung) and destination airports in Taiwan

Flight 222 was scheduled to depart from Kaohsiung at 16:00 Taiwan time (08:00 UTC), but it was delayed by bad weather and took off at 17:43.

The flight was uneventful until final approach. The weather at Magong Airport was inclement and visibility was poor, making it difficult for the pilots to see the runway. Kaohsiung Approach Control then instructed Flight 222 to remain in a holding pattern with three other aircraft. The flight crew then requested clearance to land on Runway 20. While they were waiting for their approach clearance, Kaohsiung Approach informed Flight 222 that the visibility had improved at Magong Airport. Immediately after that, the crew requested a landing clearance for Magong. Kaohsiung Approach then assigned the flight to a lower altitude and radar vector.

At 18:55 the aircraft was cleared to land. Flight 222 descended and maintained their altitude at 2,000 feet (610 m), then descended to their assigned altitude of 400 feet (120 m). The crew then set their assigned altitude to 300 feet (91 m), below the minimum descent altitude of 330 feet (100 m). After descending through 344 feet (105 m), the crew then set the altitude to 200 feet (61 m).

At 19:05, the crew disengaged the autopilot and the yaw damper. The crew then tried to locate the runway, unaware that they had deviated to the left while descending. By the time the First Officer and the Captain called for a go-around, the aircraft had an altitude of only 72 feet (22 m), hence collision with the ground was inevitable. The aircraft sheared trees for several hundred feet in a small forest. The impact caused some parts of the ATR 72 to detach from its body.

Flight 222 then flew out of the forest and into Xixi Village. The aircraft then impacted and destroyed several houses in the village. The force of the impact severely damaged the aircraft, separating the outer right wing, vertical stabilizer, and empennage. The force of the impact tore open the center fuselage. The aircraft subsequently exploded and burst into flames. Bodies of some of the passengers were thrown onto the street of Xixi Village.

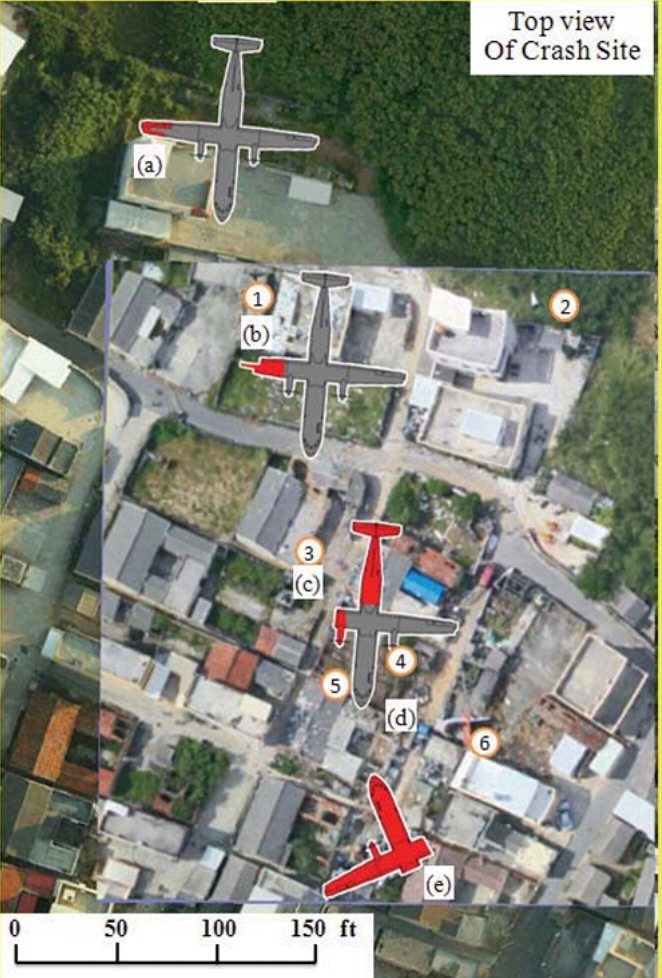
An diagram of the aircraft on top of the crash site

Most of the survivors who crawled out of the wreckage of the aircraft sought refuge in nearby houses. Residents of Xixi Village offered their assistance to the survivors, and some of them treated their injuries. Some of the survivors had cut wounds and burn injuries. 10 of the 58 people on board Flight 222 survived. Five people on the ground were injured.

== Background ==
=== Aircraft ===
The aircraft involved was an ATR 72-500, registered as B-22810 with serial number 642. It was also powered by two Pratt & Whitney Canada PW127F engines.

=== Passengers and crew ===
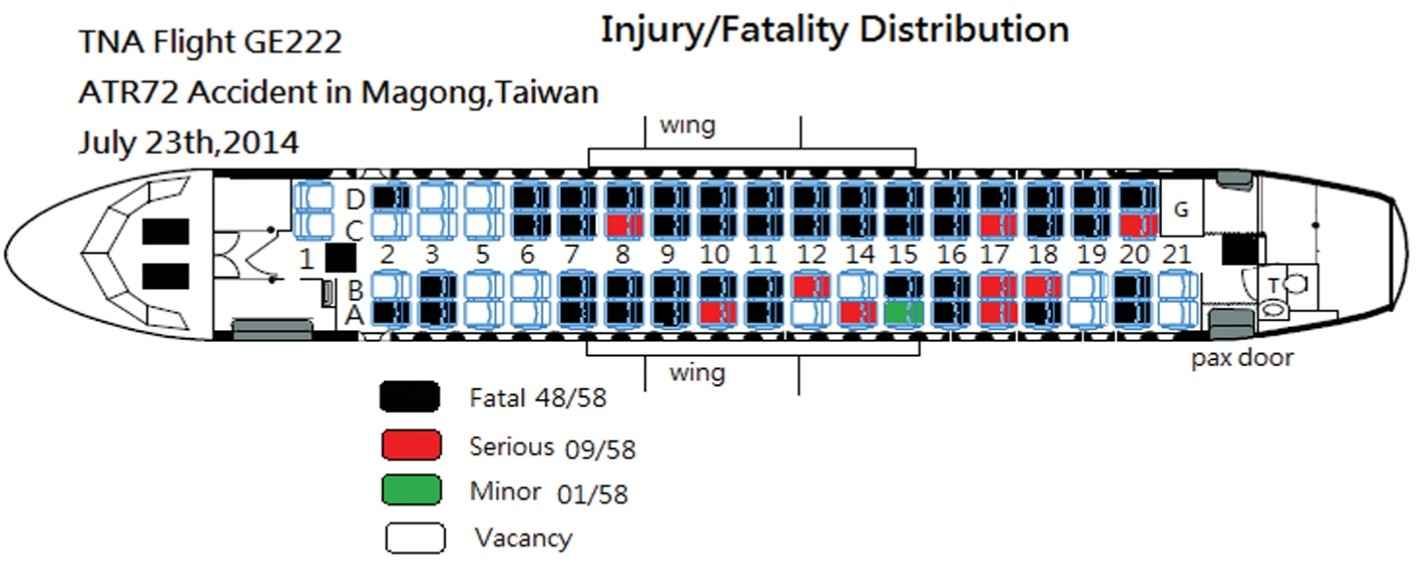
Seat map of TransAsia Airways Flight 222

There were 54 passengers on board (four of whom were reported to be children) and a crew of four. The captain was Lee Yi-liang, (Note: Lee Yi-liang Chinese: 李義良; pinyin: Lǐ Yìliáng) aged 60, and the first officer was Chiang Kuan-hsing, (Note: Chiang Kuan-hsing Chinese: 江冠興; pinyin: Jiāng Guānxīng) aged 39. Lee had logged 22,994 flight hours (including 19,069 hours on the ATR 42/72) and Chiang 2,392 hours, with 2,083 of them on the ATR 42/72.

Two French citizens and 46 Taiwanese (including all crew members) died in the accident. Among the victims was the Taiwanese master carpenter Yeh Ken-chuang.

Nationality	Passengers	Crew	Fatalities	Survivors	Total
Taiwan	52	4	46	10	56
France	2	0	2	0	2
Total	54	4	48	10	58

== Aftermath ==
Taiwan News reported that "first suspicions hinted" the accident might be related to Typhoon Matmo, which had passed over Taiwan and Penghu earlier in the day; radar images showed heavy rain over the area at the time of the crash.

TransAsia Airways general manager Chooi Yee-choong (Note: Chooi Yee-choong Chinese: 徐以聰; pinyin: Xú Yǐcōng) apologized for the accident in a news conference held on 23 July. On 30 July, TransAsia Airways announced that they had made changes to their standard operating procedures for domestic flights, and would henceforth require that visibility at the arrival airport be 50% above the published minimum before a landing is attempted, and that the maximum holding time waiting for the weather to clear before having to divert be thirty minutes. On 25 August, the airline announced compensation of NT$14.9 million for each of the 48 victims of the crash, the highest rate a Taiwanese airline has paid to crash victims since China Airlines Flight 611 in 2002.

== Investigation ==
An official investigation led by the Aviation Safety Council (ASC) of Taiwan was initiated. The aircraft's flight recorders were recovered and read out. Some findings from the flight recorders were made known on 1 August 2014. It was revealed that the pilots announced an abort and go-around at 7:06 p.m., during final approach. At that time, the RPM of the number 1 (left pilot side) engine dropped, while unusual sounds were recorded by the cockpit voice recorder. These sounds were considered to be consistent with a propeller churning on trees, an interpretation supported by the discovery of remnants of tree branches in one engine.

=== Typhoon Matmo ===
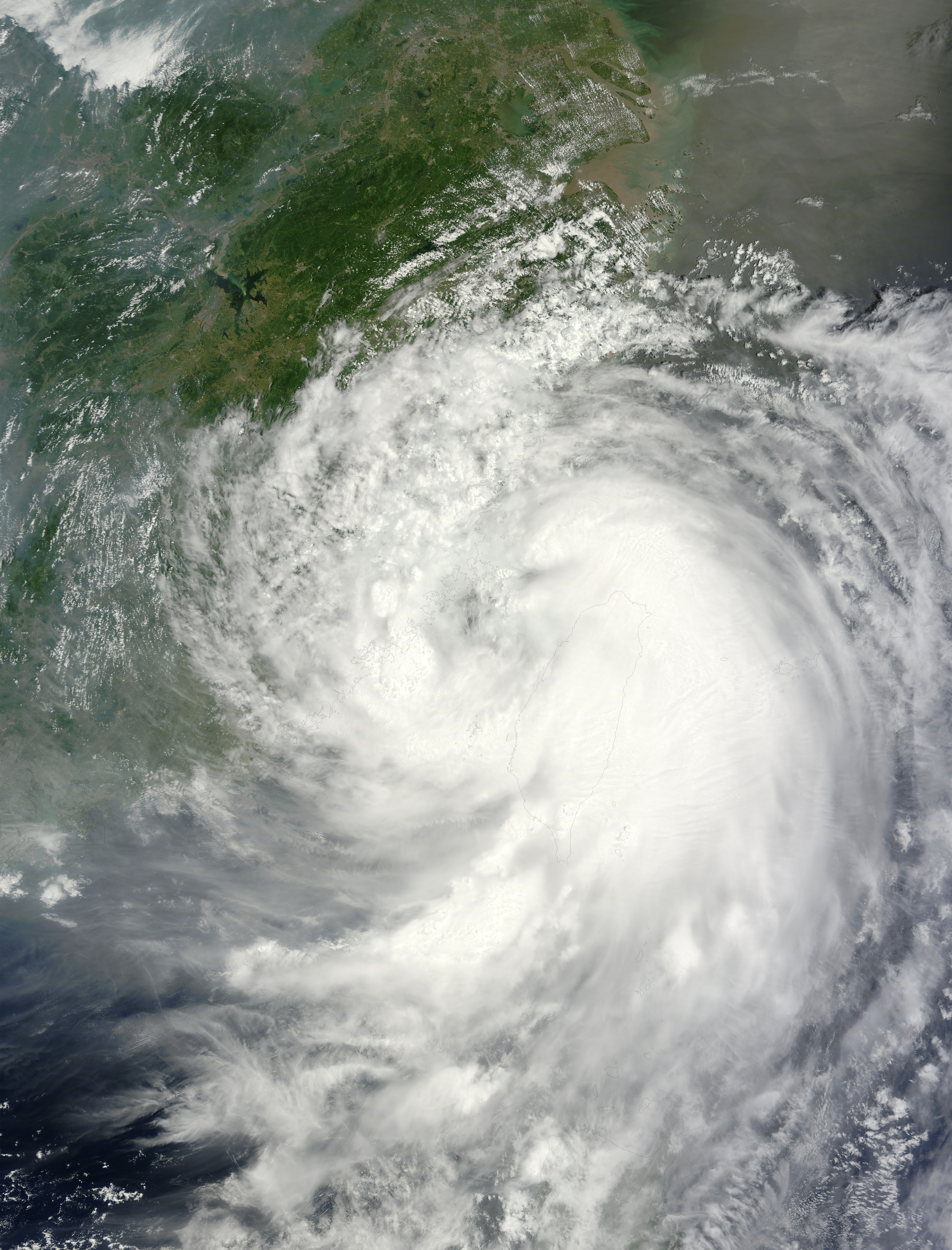
Typhoon Matmo on 23 July 2014

Initially, Typhoon Matmo was considered to be the cause of the crash, as Matmo had made landfall earlier in the day. Taipei Center had prohibited pilots to fly, with Typhoon Matmo still above Taiwan. The typhoon damaged buildings in Taiwan and injured 10 people. When Matmo had passed most of Taiwan, Taipei Center cleared pilots to fly in Taiwanese airspace, but it still warned pilots that the weather in and around Penghu Island would remain inclement. The center of Matmo was only 23 nautical miles from Penghu Island. Infrared image from Japan Meteorological Agency's satellite showed that the area surrounding Penghu were coloured "magenta" at 18:57, meaning that weather in Penghu was severe. Based on survivors' accounts, while approaching Penghu, the aircraft entered several instances of turbulence with thunder and lightning. At 19:00, Captain Lee told the passengers to prepare for landing, and the aircraft then crashed and exploded. Investigators interviewed the crew in the tower, who stated that the visibility in Magong had been greatly reduced due to Typhoon Matmo, although several minutes later, the visibility improved significantly.

Matmo affected Magong Airport, but only from its outerband. Investigators retrieved the radar images in Magong and found out that two rainbands passed through Magong Airport before and after the crash. These rainbands could cause significant changes in wind directions and rain intensity. According to radar data in Magong Airport, the rain intensity at 18:03 until 19:00 was moderate. This was the first rainband to pass the airport. The intensity decreased sometime between 18:35 and 19:00, but as the second rainband passed the airport, the rain intensified, and visibility reduced rapidly.

=== GE222's flight recorder analysis ===
After the retrieval of both the flight recorders of Flight 222, investigators then examined its content. Initial examination of the cockpit voice recorder (CVR) revealed that the flight crew neither conducted an approach briefing nor a descent/approach checklist after the flight had been cleared by Magong Tower to land. This was contrary to the company's standard operating procedure. Even though the flight crew did not formally brief or discuss the details in the approach chart, the first officer did remind the captain about several important things, including height of the aircraft and the distance requirements. As the examination continued, it was revealed that the crew had already known what they needed to know for the approach. They already knew that the minimum descent altitude was at 330 feet (100 m); however, while on the approach, the flight crew kept descending to low as 200 feet (61 m). The CVR also showed that there was no discussion among the crew as to whether the required visual references had been obtained as Captain Lee still put the aircraft in descent well below the minimum descent altitude. First Officer Chiang did not intervene to point out Captain Lee's mistake but rather coordinated with Lee's decision to descend below the minimum descent altitude, contrary to the standard operating procedure.

In an attempt to see the runway, the crew then maintained altitude at 200 feet (61 m). The flight crew then disengaged the autopilot and the yaw damper. Captain Lee then asked First Officer Chiang if he had seen the runway. Instead of commencing a missed approach, both pilots spent about 13 seconds attempting to locate the runway. During their search for the runway, the heavy thunderstorm rain activity intensified with a maximum rainfall of 1.8 millimetres (0.071 in) per minute. This further reduced the visibility to 1,600 feet (500 m). After the disengagement of the autopilot, the aircraft's altitude and heading changed. Captain Lee intentionally deviated the aircraft to the left, from wings level to a roll of 19° to the left, and subsequently reduced to 4° to the left. The pitch angle of the aircraft had also started to decrease from 0.4° nose up to 9° nose down, and subsequently changed to 5.4° nose down. This caused the aircraft to lose its altitude and descend from 179 feet (55 m) to 72 feet (22 m).

=== TransAsia Airways ===
Knowing that several standard operating procedures were violated in Flight 222, especially descending below the minimum descent altitude, investigators then tried to identify if the problems came from TransAsia Airways itself. Interviews with some of the pilots of TransAsia Airways found that routine violations from the standard operating procedure were normal. In particular, the flight crew were known to descend below the minimum before acquiring the required visual references. The Taiwanese AIC had known of these routine violations in TransAsia Airways before, as they had already investigated incidents involving TransAsia Airways before Flight 222. In response to the previous investigation, the airline implemented several safety actions to eliminate standard operating procedure violations. The safety actions implemented by TransAsia Airways were inadequate and ineffective, thus standard operating procedure violations continued as usual. While there was a supervisor for the Standards and Training Section, the high flight times and instructional workload of the check and training pilots assigned to assist him was such that they had insufficient time available to perform support tasks such as reviewing standard operating procedure training, audits, and operational safety risk assessments. In addition, the shortage of standards pilots may have been another reason why the standard operating procedure were not as effective as they could have been.

Investigators then revealed that TransAsia Airways tolerated their pilots' lack of discipline. The AIC also revealed that there were many problems with the management system in TransAsia Airways.

=== Pilot fatigue ===
Taiwan's ASC then examined TransAsia's pilots' roster time and flight times. From May to July 2014, more than half of TransAsia Airways pilots had accrued over 270 flying hours. Their number was significantly higher compared to the peak summer season in 2013, in which only 27% of the pilots accrued over 270 flying hours. The number of daily sectors flown had also increased to a maximum of 8, which many crew found exhausting. Most of the pilots interviewed by investigators agreed that most violations of the standard operating procedures occurred when they felt fatigued, particularly when they operated a flight later in the day. The pilots protested on several occasions, but the management of TransAsia Airways apparently ignored the complaints. It did not even conduct a safety risk assessment on the matter.

There have been many plane crashes involving pilot fatigue, one of the most famous occurring in the United States in 2009 when Colgan Air Flight 3407 crashed into a house in Buffalo, New York, and the deadliest occurring in 1997 when Korean Air Flight 801 crashed into Nimitz Hill in Asan-Maina, Guam. The AIC then examined if Captain Lee was fatigued at the time of the accident. If he was, then this could explain why he intentionally deviated the aircraft from its approach course. Investigators found out that Lee was not intoxicated and was also not affected either by medication or by physical health problems. The investigators could not determine if the pilots had acquired enough sleep before the flight, as they could not retrieve the data of the total hours of sleep the crew had taken before the flight. The examination of the System of Aircrew Fatigue Evaluation (SAFE) of the Flight 222 crew revealed that Captain Lee felt a little tired, but that First Officer Chiang was not fatigued at all. This was evidenced by Captain Lee's yawning, which could be heard in the CVR. He also stated that he was very tired. It was revealed that several incorrect actions from Captain Lee to the tower had occurred during the flight.

The crew were local short-haul regional pilots. Their rosters indicated a common fatigue-producing factor of early starts and/or late finishes, where short-haul pilots had the tendency to progressively lose more sleep in a given roster cycle.

The ASC concluded that Captain Lee was indeed fatigued at the time of the accident, citing his degraded performance. The ASC also stated that if TransAsia Airways implemented a fatigue risk management system (FRMS) or a system similar to it, the crew would have been less fatigued. However, these procedures were not mandatory.

=== CRM failure ===
Among the plausible explanations of the cause of the crash is a failure in crew resource management (CRM). A steep trans-cockpit authority gradient may have meant that the First Officer did not challenge, intervene, or correct the Captain's mistakes. This may have occurred due to skills comparison. Other aircraft crashes which have been partly explained by a steep trans-cockpit authority include Airblue Flight 202 and Merpati Nusantara Airlines Flight 8968. In Flight 222, First Officer Chiang did not challenge any of Captain Lee's errors. He did not voice any concerns over the actions that Captain Lee took. It would have also increased the probability of Captain Lee making decisions without consulting the first officer. The aircraft's impact with terrain was a direct consequence of the captain descending the aircraft below the published minimum descent altitude for the runway 20 VOR approach procedure. Moreover, it was also as a result of poor planning by the crew. During the landing approach, the actions of the flight crew progressively increased the risk of a controlled flight into terrain (CFIT). The crew seemed unaware that an impact with terrain was almost certain until the final two seconds.

=== Captain Lee's overconfidence ===
Interviews conducted by the AIC revealed that Captain Lee had good flying skills, and further stated that he, Captain Lee, had successfully landed in an airport previously in adverse weather condition because of his proficiency where some pilots might have initiated a missed approach. The pilots stated that Captain Lee was quite confident of his flying skills. This might be one of the factors that explained why the captain intentionally flew below the minimum descent altitude and tried to visually locate the runway while maintaining 200 ft.

=== Conclusion ===
The final report was published in January 2016. The investigation found that this was a controlled flight into terrain accident. The crew had limited awareness of the aircraft's proximity to terrain. They continued the approach below the minimum descent altitude when they were not visually with the runway environment. The Captain was not complying with (and had a complete disregard for) policies, procedures and regulations. This type of hazardous attitude is characterized as "Anti-Authority".

The final report reached the following final conclusion:

The occurrence was the result of controlled flight into terrain, that is, an airworthy aircraft under the control of the flight crew was flown unintentionally into terrain with limited awareness by the crew of the aircraft’s proximity to terrain. The crew continued the approach below the minimum descent altitude (MDA) when they were not visual with the runway environment contrary to standard operating procedures. The investigation report identified a range of contributing and other safety factors relating to the flight crew of the aircraft, TransAsia's flight operations and safety management processes, the communication of weather information to the flight crew, coordination issues at civil/military joint-use airport, and the regulatory oversight of TransAsia by the Civil Aeronautics Administration (CAA).

== Dramatization ==
The crash was featured in the 2nd episode of Season 18 of Mayday (Air Crash Investigation). The episode is titled "Blown Away".

== See also ==
- TransAsia Airways Flight 235 – A second TransAsia ATR 72 lost in a crash seven months later
- Sosoliso Airlines Flight 1145 – A DC-9 that also crashed during a go-around attempt in bad weather
- Crossair Flight 3597 – Another flight that crashed in nearly identical conditions near Zürich Airport
- Flydubai Flight 981 – A Boeing 737 that also crashed during a go-around attempt in bad weather less than two years later.
- Downeast Airlines Flight 46 – Another flight that also crashed while approaching the airport in bad weather due to low visibility
