= List of strong typhoons =

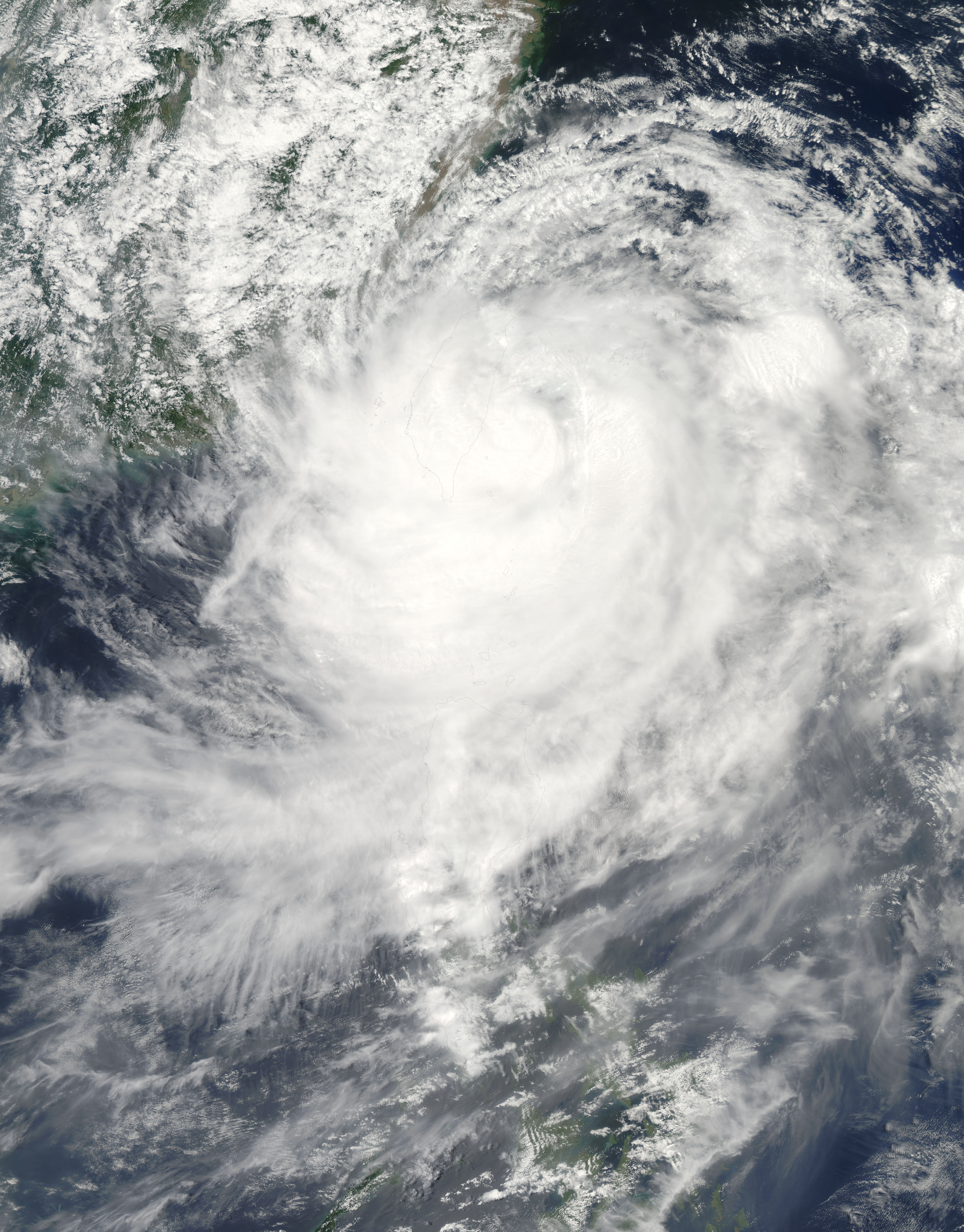
Typhoon Morakot approaching Taiwan in August 2009

A strong typhoon is the lowest category used by the Japan Meteorological Agency (JMA) to classify tropical cyclones that has reached typhoon intensity in the Northwest Pacific basin. The basin is limited to the north of the equator between the 100th meridian east and the 180th meridian. The category of a strong typhoon is defined as a tropical cyclone that has 10-minute sustained wind speeds between 64 and 84 knots (118–116 km/h; 74–97 mph).

== Background ==
RSMC Tokyo's Tropical Cyclone Intensity Scale
Category	Sustained winds
Violent typhoon	≥105 knots ≥194 km/h
Very strong typhoon	85–104 knots 157–193 km/h
Typhoon	64–84 knots 118–156 km/h
Severe tropical storm	48–63 knots 89–117 km/h
Tropical storm	34–47 knots 62–88 km/h
Tropical depression	≤33 knots ≤61 km/h

The Northwest Pacific basin covers a vast area in the Pacific Ocean, located north of the equator, between 100°E and 180°E. Several weather agencies monitor this basin, however it is officially monitored by the Japan Meteorological Agency (JMA, RSMC Tokyo), who is responsible for forecasting, naming and issuing warnings for tropical cyclones. Unofficially, the Joint Typhoon Warning Center also monitors the basin, however these warnings measures 1-minute sustained wind speeds, comparing their scale to the Saffir–Simpson scale. The JMA uses a simpler scale on classifying tropical cyclones adapted by the ESCAP/WMO Typhoon Committee measuring 10-minute sustained wind speeds, ranging from a tropical depression, tropical storm, severe tropical storm and typhoon. Furthermore, the JMA divides the typhoon category into three sub-categories for domestic purposes – a strong typhoon, very strong typhoon and violent typhoon.

This article covers a list of systems developing in the Northwest Pacific basin that were classified by the JMA's category of a strong typhoon. The category of a strong typhoon ranges with 10-minute sustained winds of between 64 and 84 knots (118–116 km/h; 74–97 mph).

== Systems ==
Key

- † Discontinuous duration (weakened below a "Strong" typhoon then restrengthened to that classification at least once)

=== 1990s ===
Name	System dates	Duration (hours)	Sustained wind speeds	Pressure	Areas affected	Damage (USD)	Deaths	Refs
Marian	May 17–18, 1990	36	130 km/h (80 mph)	965 hPa (28.50 inHg)	Philippines, Taiwan	None	None	
Ofelia	June 22–23, 1990	12	120 km/h (75 mph)	970 hPa (28.64 inHg)	Philippines, Taiwan, East China, Korean Peninsula	Unknown	64	
Percy	June 23–29, 1990	132	150 km/h (90 mph)	950 hPa (28.05 inHg)	Caroline Islands, Philippines, Taiwan, China	Unknown	9	
Vernon	July 31 – August 4, 1990	72	140 km/h (85 mph)	955 hPa (28.20 inHg)	None	None	None	
Yancy	August 17–19, 1990	54	150 km/h (90 mph)	950 hPa (28.05 inHg)	Mariana Islands, Taiwan, China	Unknown	236	
Zola	August 20–22, 1990	48	140 km/h (85 mph)	960 hPa (28.35 inHg)	Japan	None	3	
Becky	August 27–29, 1990	42	130 km/h (80 mph)	965 hPa (28.50 inHg)	Philippines, Taiwan	None	None	
Abe	August 28–31, 1990	60	140 km/h (85 mph)	955 hPa (28.20 inHg)	Ryukyu Islands, Japan, Taiwan, East China, South Korea	$748 million	184	
Dot	September 6–7, 1990	42	140 km/h (85 mph)	960 hPa (28.35 inHg)	Philippines, South China, Taiwan	Unknown	7	
Ed	September 15–18, 1990	72	130 km/h (80 mph)	965 hPa (28.50 inHg)	Philippines, Vietnam, South China	Unknown	7	
Gene	September 25–29, 1990	96	150 km/h (90 mph)	950 hPa (28.05 inHg)	Japan	Unknown	4	
Hattie	October 3–7, 1990	102	150 km/h (90 mph)	950 hPa (28.05 inHg)	Japan	Unknown	3	
Kyle	October 20–22, 1990	54	140 km/h (85 mph)	955 hPa (28.20 inHg)	None	None	None	
Yunya	June 13–14, 1991	30	150 km/h (90 mph)	950 hPa (28.05 inHg)	Philippines	Unknown	7	
Zeke	July 12, 1991	18	120 km/h (75 mph)	970 hPa (28.64 inHg)	Philippines, South China	Unknown	23	
Caitlin	July 25–29, 1991	96	150 km/h (90 mph)	940 hPa (27.76 inHg)	Philippines, Taiwan, Japan, South Korea	$4 million	19	
Ellie	August 13–15, 1991	45	130 km/h (80 mph)	960 hPa (28.35 inHg)	Ryukyu Islands, Taiwan, East China	None	None	
Fred	August 14–16, 1991	54	150 km/h (90 mph)	960 hPa (28.35 inHg)	South China, Indochina	Unknown	38	
Kinna	September 12–13, 1991	33	150 km/h (90 mph)	955 hPa (28.20 inHg)	Japan, Korean Peninsula	Unknown	9	
Nat	September 21 – October 1, 1991	69†	150 km/h (90 mph)	950 hPa (28.05 inHg)	Philippines, Taiwan, China	Unknown	Unknown	
Chuck	June 27–28, 1992	30	130 km/h (80 mph)	965 hPa (28.50 inHg)	Philippines, South China, Vietnam	$36.4 million	7	
Eli	July 11, 1992	6	130 km/h (80 mph)	965 hPa (28.50 inHg)	Philippines, South China, Vietnam	$235 million	1	
Brian	October 22–24, 1992	60	150 km/h (90 mph)	950 hPa (28.05 inHg)	Caroline Islands	None	None	
Tasha	August 20–21, 1993	18	120 km/h (75 mph)	975 hPa (28.79 inHg)	Philippines, South China	None	None	
Vernon	August 25–27, 1993	51	130 km/h (80 mph)	960 hPa (28.35 inHg)	Japan	Unknown	2	
Dot	September 25–26, 1993	18	130 km/h (80 mph)	965 hPa (28.50 inHg)	Philippines, South China	Unknown	None	
Flo	October 4, 1993	12	120 km/h (75 mph)	970 hPa (28.79 inHg)	Philippines, Ryukyu Islands	Unknown	10	
Kyle	November 22–23, 1993	24	130 km/h (80 mph)	960 hPa (28.35 inHg)	Philippine, Vietnam, Cambodia	Unknown	70	
Lola	December 4–8, 1993	60†	150 km/h (90 mph)	955 hPa (28.20 inHg)	Philippines, Indochina	Unknown	308	
Manny	December 9–10, 1993	30	140 km/h (85 mph)	955 hPa (28.20 inHg)	Philippines, Vietnam, Thailand	Unknown	230	
Page	May 15–16, 1994	30	130 km/h (80 mph)	965 hPa (28.50 inHg)	Caroline Islands	None	None	
Ellie	August 12–14, 1994	48	150 km/h (90 mph)	965 hPa (28.50 inHg)	Japan, East China	None	None	
Gladys	August 31 – September 1, 1994	24	150 km/h (90 mph)	955 hPa (28.20 inHg)	Ryukyu Islands, Taiwan, East China	$15.4 million	6	
Ivy	August 31 – September 1, 1994	30	140 km/h (85 mph)	960 hPa (28.35 inHg)	None	None	None	
Kinna	September 9–11, 1994	48	140 km/h (85 mph)	960 hPa (28.35 inHg)	None	None	None	
Pat	September 23–24, 1994	42	130 km/h (80 mph)	965 hPa (28.35 inHg)	None	None	None	
Teresa	October 19–24, 1994	84	150 km/h (90 mph)	955 hPa (28.20 inHg)	Mariana Islands, Philippines, Vietnam, Cambodia	$16.4 million	16	
Verne	October 20–27, 1994	174	150 km/h (90 mph)	950 hPa (28.05 inHg)	None	None	None	
Faye	July 22–23, 1995	33	140 km/h (85 mph)	950 hPa (28.05 inHg)	Ryukyu Islands, Korean Peninsula	Unknown	16	
Mark	September 1, 1995	18	120 km/h (75 mph)	985 hPa (29.09 inHg)	None	None	None	
Polly	September 18–21, 1995	66	140 km/h (85 mph)	960 hPa (28.35 inHg)	Philippines, Taiwan, Japan	Unknown	None	
Brian	October 22–24, 1995	60	150 km/h (90 mph)	950 hPa (28.05 inHg)	Caroline Islands	None	None	
Dan	July 8–9, 1996	30	120 km/h (75 mph)	970 hPa (28.64 inHg)	Japan	None	None	
Gloria	July 24–26, 1996	54	120 km/h (75 mph)	965 hPa (28.50 inHg)	Philippines, Taiwan, South China	$23 million	23	
Kirk	August 10–14, 1996	102	140 km/h (85 mph)	955 hPa (28.20 inHg)	Ryukyu Islands, Japan	None	2	
Niki	August 21–22, 1996	30	120 km/h (75 mph)	970 hPa (28.64 inHg)	Philippines, South China, Vietnam	$65 million	Unknown	
Orson	August 25–28, 1996	78	140 km/h (85 mph)	955 hPa (28.20 inHg)	None	None	None	
Tom	September 15–18, 1996	72	130 km/h (80 mph)	965 hPa (28.50 inHg)	None	None	None	
Zane	September 26 – October 1, 1996	132	150 km/h (90 mph)	950 hPa (28.05 inHg)	Micronesia	None	None	
Carlo	October 24, 1996	24	130 km/h (80 mph)	965 hPa (28.50 inHg)	Mariana Islands	None	None	
Marie	May 31, 1997	18	120 km/h (75 mph)	965 hPa (28.50 inHg)	None	None	None	
Tina	August 4–8, 1997	108	140 km/h (85 mph)	955 hPa (28.20 inHg)	Ryukyu Islands, South Korea	None	None	
Amber	August 23–28, 1997	132	150 km/h (90 mph)	950 hPa (28.05 inHg)	Philippines, Taiwan, China	$52 million	Unknown	
Otto	August 4, 1998	6	120 km/h (75 mph)	970 hPa (28.64 inHg)	Philippines, Taiwan, East China	$761,000	5	
Rex	August 26 – September 3, 1998	210	140 km/h (85 mph)	955 hPa (28.20 inHg)	Japan	None	25	
Todd	September 17–18, 1998	30	140 km/h (85 mph)	955 hPa (28.20 inHg)	Ryukyu Islands, East China	$237,000	7	
Vicki	September 21–22, 1998	24	140 km/h (85 mph)	960 hPa (28.35 inHg)	Philippines, Japan	$81.7 million	108	
Yanni	September 29, 1998	6	120 km/h (75 mph)	965 hPa (28.50 inHg)	Taiwan, Ryukyu Islands, South Korea	Unknown	50	
Faith	December 10–11, 1998	30	120 km/h (75 mph)	970 hPa (28.64 inHg)	Philippines, Vietnam, Laos	$28 million	48	
Leo	April 30, 1999	24	120 km/h (75 mph)	970 hPa (28.64 inHg)	South China	None	None	
Maggie	June 4–5, 1999	48	140 km/h (85 mph)	955 hPa (28.20 inHg)	Philippines, Taiwan, South China	$168 million	9	
Olga	August 1, 1999	6	120 km/h (75 mph)	970 hPa (28.64 inHg)	Ryukyu Islands, Korean Peninsula	$657 million	106	
Dan	October 4–8, 1999	102†	130 km/h (80 mph)	955 hPa (28.20 inHg)	Philippines, Taiwan, China, South Korea	$242 million	44	

=== 2000s ===
Name	System dates	Duration (hours)	Sustained wind speeds	Pressure	Areas affected	Damage (USD)	Deaths	Refs
Kai-tak	July 6–8, 2000	48	140 km/h (85 mph)	960 hPa (28.35 inHg)	Philippines, Taiwan, East China, Korean Peninsula	Unknown	16	
Ewiniar	August 15–16, 2000	18	120 km/h (75 mph)	975 hPa (28.79 inHg)	None	None	None	
Prapiroon	August 30–31, 2000	30	130 km/h (89 mph)	950 hPa (28.05 inHg)	Ryukyu Islands, Taiwan, East China, Korean Peninsula	$6.01 billion	75	
Wukong	September 7–9, 2000	36	140 km/h (85 mph)	955 hPa (28.20 inHg)	South China, Vietnam, Laos	None	None	
Yagi	October 24–25, 2000	24	130 km/h (80 mph)	965 hPa (28.50 inHg)	Ryukyu Islands, Taiwan	None	None	
Xangsane	October 29–31, 2000	48	140 km/h (85 mph)	960 hPa (28.35 inHg)	Philippines, Taiwan, Japan	Unknown	16	
Soulik	January 3–4, 2001	24	150 km/h (90 mph)	950 hPa (28.05 inHg)	None	None	None	
Chebi	June 22–23, 2001	18	120 km/h (75 mph)	965 hPa (28.50 inHg)	Philippines, Taiwan, China	$471 million	108	
Kong-rey	July 25–28, 2001	60	130 km/h (80 mph)	955 hPa (28.20& inHg)	None	None	None	
Toraji	July 27–29, 2001	48	120 km/h (75 mph)	965 hPa (28.50 inHg)	Philippines, Taiwan, East China	$245 million	200	
Man-yi	August 4–7, 2001	96	150 km/h (90 mph)	955 hPa (28.20 inHg)	Mariana Islands	$50,000	None	
Pabuk	August 17–21, 2001	105	130 km/h (80 mph)	960 hPa (28.35 inHg)	Mariana Islands, Japan	$7.1 million	6	
Nari	September 11–16, 2001	66†	140 km/h (85 mph)	960 hPa (28.35 inHg)	Ryukyu Islands, Taiwan, East China	$443 million	104	
Vipa	September 20, 2001	6	120 km/h (75 mph)	975 hPa (28.79 inHg)	Japan	None	None	
Lekima	September 24–26, 2001	42†	130 km/h (80 mph)	965 hPa (28.50 inHg)	Philippines, Taiwan, East China	Unknown	2	
Krosa	October 5–8, 2001	84	150 km/h (90 mph)	950 hPa (28.05 inHg)	Mariana Islands	None	None	
Haiyan	October 15–16, 2001	33	130 km/h (80 mph)	960 hPa (28.35 inHg)	Taiwan, Japan	$3.4 million	2	
Fung-wong	July 23–24, 2002	36	130 km/h (80 mph)	960 hPa (28.35 inHg)	Japan	None	None	
Rusa	August 25–31, 2002	138	150 km/h (90 mph)	950 hPa (28.05 inHg)	Ryukyu Islands, Korean Peninsula	$4.2 billion	38	
Sinlaku	August 31 – September 7, 2002	180	150 km/h (90 mph)	950 hPa (28.05 inHg)	Ryukyu Islands, East China	$723 million	30	
Huko	November 3–5, 2002	54	140 km/h (85 mph)	985 hPa (29.09 inHg)	None	None	None	
Soudelor	June 17–18, 2003	36	150 km/h (90 mph)	955 hPa (28.20 inHg)	Philippines, Taiwan, Japan, South Korea	$15.3 million	14	
Krovanh	August 22–25, 2003	36†	120 km/h (75 mph)	970 hPa (28.64 inHg)	Philippines, South China, Vietnam	$253 million	4	
Dujuan	August 30 – September 2, 2003	66	150 km/h (90 mph)	950 hPa (28.05 inHg)	Philippines, Taiwan, Ryukyu Islands, East China	$392 million	44	
Choi-wan	September 20–22, 2003	45	130 km/h (80 mph)	955 hPa (28.20 inHg)	Japan	$2.5 million	None	
Koppu	September 28–29, 2003	24	130 km/h (80 mph)	960 hPa (28.35 inHg)	None	None	None	
Nepartak	November 16, 2003	6	120 km/h (75 mph)	970 hPa (28.64 inHg)	Philippines, Vietnam, South China	$197 million	13	
Conson	June 8–10, 2004	63	150 km/h (90 mph)	960 hPa (28.35 inHg)	Philippines, Taiwan, Ryukyu Islands	$3.8 million	30	
Tingting	June 28–July 2, 2004	102	150 km/h (90 mph)	955 hPa (28.20 inHg)	Mariana Islands	$23.7 million	12	
Meranti	August 5–6, 2004	36	140 km/h (85 mph)	960 hPa (28.35 inHg)	Wake Island	None	None	
Rananim	August 10–12, 2004	54	150 km/h (90 mph)	950 hPa (28.05 inHg)	Ryukyu Islands, Taiwan, East China	$2.44 billion	169	
Megi	August 18–19, 2004	36	120 km/h (75 mph)	970 hPa (28.65 inHg)	Japan, Korean Peninsula	Unknown	5	
Aere	August 22–25, 2004	72	150 km/h (90 mph)	955 hPa (28.20 inHg)	Ryukyu Islands, East China, Taiwan	$313,000	107	
Muifa	November 17–22, 2004	66†	150 km/h (90 mph)	950 hPa (28.05 inHg)	Philippines, Vietnam, Thailand, Malaysia	$18 million	108	
Matsa	August 2–5, 2005	84	150 km/h (90 mph)	950 hPa (28.05 inHg)	Taiwan, East China, Korean Peninsula	$2.23 billion	29	
Saola	September 22–25, 2005	96	150 km/h (90 mph)	950 hPa (28.05 inHg)	None	None	None	
Damrey	September 24–26, 2005	48	150 km/h (90 mph)	955 hPa (28.20 inHg)	Philippines, South China, Vietnam, Laos	$1.73 billion	180	
Kai-tak	October 30–31, 2005	30	150 km/h (90 mph)	950 hPa (28.05 inHg)	Vietnam, South China	$11 million	19	
Kaemi	July 20–24, 2006	96	150 km/h (90 mph)	950 hPa (28.05 inHg)	Taiwan, China	$450 million	32	
Prapiroon	August 2–3, 2006	24	120 km/h (75 mph)	970 hPa (28.64 inHg)	Caroline Islands, Taiwan, China	$984 million	94	
Maria	August 6–8, 2006	45	130 km/h (80 mph)	975 hPa (28.79 inHg)	Japan	None	1	
Soulik	October 12–15, 2006	84	140 km/h (85 mph)	955 hPa (28.20 inHg)	None	None	None	
Kong-rey	April 3–4, 2007	42	150 km/h (90 mph)	960 hPa (28.35 inHg)	Mariana Islands	$10,000	None	
Pabuk	August 7, 2007	12	120 km/h (75 mph)	960 hPa (28.35 inHg)	Philippines, Taiwan, East China	$227 million	15	
Fitow	August 30 – September 6, 2007	144†	130 km/h (80 mph)	975 hPa (28.79 inHg)	Japan	$1 billion	3	
Peipah	November 6–7, 2007	24	130 km/h (80 mph)	970 hPa (28.64 inHg)	Philippines, Vietnam	Unknown	50	
Hagibis	November 22–23, 2007	42	130 km/h (80 mph)	970 hPa (28.64 inHg)	Philippines, Vietnam	$5.3 million	22	
Neoguri	April 16–18, 2008	60	150 km/h (90 mph)	960 hPa (28.35 inHg)	Philippines, South China	$65 million	26	
Kalmaegi	July 17, 2008	6	120 km/h (75 mph)	970 hPa (28.64 inHg)	Philippines, Taiwan, Ryukyu Islands, East China, Korean Peninsula	$332 million	25	
Fung-wong	July 27–28, 2008	30	140 km/h (85 mph)	960 hPa (28.35 inHg)	Taiwan, China	$541 million	23	
Nuri	August 18–21, 2008	72	140 km/h (85 mph)	955 hPa (28.20 inHg)	Philippines, China	$85 million	20	
Dolphin	December 15–16, 2008	18	120 km/h (75 mph)	970 hPa (28.64 inHg)	Mariana Islands	$9,000	47	
Chan-hom	May 6–7, 2009	18	120 km/h (75 mph)	975 hPa (28.79 inHg)	Vietnam, Philippines	$26.1 million	60	
Molave	July 17–18, 2009	24	120 km/h (75 mph)	975 hPa (28.79 inHg)	Philippines, Taiwan, China	$8,000	5	
Morakot	August 5–7, 2009	54	140 km/h (85 mph)	945 hPa (27.91 inHg)	Philippines, Taiwan, Ryukyu Islands, East China, Korean Peninsula	$6.2 billion	789	
Koppu	September 14, 2009	6	120 km/h (75 mph)	975 hPa (28.79 inHg)	Philippines, South China	$313 million	12	
Ketsana	September 28–29, 2009	30	130 km/h (80 mph)	960 hPa (28.35 inHg)	Philippines, Indochina	$1.09 billion	710	
Mirinae	October 28–30, 2009	60	150 km/h (90 mph)	955 hPa (28.20 inHg)	Caroline Islands, Mariana Islands, Philippines, Indochina	$295 million	162	

=== 2010s ===
Name	System dates	Duration (hours)	Sustained wind speeds	Pressure	Areas affected	Damage (USD)	Deaths	Refs
Conson	July 12–16, 2010	60†	130 km/h (80 mph)	970 hPa (28.64 inHg)	Philippines, South China, Vietnam	$82 million	106	
Chanthu	July 21–22, 2010	30	130 km/h (80 mph)	970 hPa (28.64 inHg)	Philippines, South China	$818 million	19	
Kompasu	August 30 – September 1, 2010	48	150 km/h (90 mph)	960 hPa (28.35 inHg)	East China, Korean Peninsula	$58.2 million	29	
Sonca	September 18–20, 2011	48	130 km/h (80 mph)	970 hPa (28.64 inHg)	None	None	None	
Nesat	September 26–29, 2011	90	150 km/h (90 mph)	950 hPa (28.05 inHg)	Philippines, South China, Vietnam	$2.12 billion	98	
Mawar	June 3–5, 2012	42	140 km/h (85 mph)	960 hPa (28.35 inHg)	Philippines, Japan	None	3	
Vicente	July 23, 2012	12	150 km/h (90 mph)	950 hPa (28.05 inHg)	Philippines, South China, Vietnam, Laos	$324 million	13	
Saola	July 31 – August 1, 2012	30	130 km/h (80 mph)	960 hPa (28.35 inHg)	Philippines, Taiwan, East China	$2.95 billion	86	
Damrey	August 2, 2012	18	130 km/h (80 mph)	965 hPa (28.50 inHg)	Ryukyu Islands, East China, South Korea	$4.37 billion	44	
Haikui	August 7, 2012	12	130 km/h (80 mph)	965 hPa (28.50 inHg)	Japan, Philippines, East China	$5.92 billion	115	
Kai-tak	August 16–17, 2012	18	120 km/h (75 mph)	970 hPa (28.64 inHg)	Philippines, South China, Vietnam	$765 million	38	
Tembin	August 20–28, 2012	198	150 km/h (90 mph)	950 hPa (28.05 inHg)	Philippines, Taiwan, East China, Ryukyu Islands, South Korea	$8.25 million	10	
Man-yi	September 15, 2013	12	120 km/h (75 mph)	960 hPa (28.35 inHg)	Japan, Russia Far East	$1.62 billion	6	
Wutip	September 28–30, 2013	48	120 km/h (75 mph)	965 hPa (28.50 inHg)	Indochina	$648 million	27	
Fitow	October 4–6, 2013	54	140 km/h (85 mph)	960 hPa (28.35 inHg)	Ryukyu Islands, Taiwan, East China	$10.4 billion	12	
Nari	October 10–14, 2013	102	140 km/h (85 mph)	965 hPa (28.50 inHg)	Philippines, South China, Indochina	$289 million	93	
Krosa	October 31 – November 2, 2013	66	140 km/h (85 mph)	970 hPa (28.65 inHg)	Philippines, Taiwan, South China, Vietnam	$6.4 million	4	
Faxai	March 4, 2014	12	120 km/h (75 mph)	965 hPa (28.50 inHg)	Mariana Islands	Nonw	1	
Matmo	July 20–22, 2014	54	130 km/h (80 mph)	965 hPa (28.50 inHg)	Philippines, Taiwan, East China	$418 million	65	
Kalmaegi	September 13–16, 2014	66†	140 km/h (85 mph)	960 hPa (28.35 inHg)	Philippines, South China, Indochina	$2.92 billion	48	
Halola	July 14–25, 2015	138	150 km/h (90 mph)	955 hPa (28.20 inHg)	Wake Island, Japan, South Korea	$1.24 million	None	
Kilo	September 2–9, 2015	180	150 km/h (90 mph)	950 hPa (28.05 inHg)	Japan	None	None	
Mindulle	August 21–22, 2016	12	120 km/h (75 mph)	975 hPa (28.79 inHg)	Mariana Islands, Japan	$448 million	2	
Namtheun	September 2–3, 2016	36	130 km/h (80 mph)	955 hPa (28.20 inHg)	Taiwan, Ryukyu Islands, South Korea	None	None	
Meari	November 5–7, 2016	54	140 km/h (80 mph)	960 hPa (28.35 inHg)	Mariana Islands	None	None	
Nesat	July 28–29, 2017	42	150 km/h (90 mph)	960 hPa (28.35 inHg)	Philippines, Taiwan, East China	$282 million	3	
Banyan	August 12–15, 2017	72	150 km/h (90 mph)	950 hPa (28.20 inHg)	None	None	None	
Hato	August 22–23, 2017	18	140 km/h (85 mph)	965 hPa (28.50 inHg)	Philippines, Taiwan, South China, Vietnam	$6.4 billion	24	
Sanvu	August 31 – September 3, 2017	60	150 km/h (90 mph)	955 hPa (28.20 inHg)	Mariana Islands	None	1	
Doksuri	September 14–15, 2017	30	150 km/h (90 mph)	955 hPa (28.20 inHg)	Philippines, Indochina	$836 million	29	
Khanun	October 14–15, 2017	24	140 km/h (85 mph)	955 hPa (28.20 inHg)	Philippines, South China, Vietnam	$373 million	1	
Damrey	November 3–4, 2017	30	130 km/h (80 mph)	970 hPa (28.79 inHg)	Philippines, Vietnam, Cambodia	$1.03 billion	15	
Tembin	December 23–24, 2017	30	130 km/h (80 mph)	970 hPa (28.79 inHg)	Philippines, Malaysia, Vietnam	$42 million	266	
Prapiroon	July 2, 2018	24	120 km/h (75 mph)	960 hPa (28.35 inHg)	Japan, Korean Peninsula	$10.1 million	4	
Jongdari	July 26 — 28, 2018	48	140 km/h (85 mph)	960 hPa (28.35 inHg)	Japan, East China	$1.48 billion	None	
Shanshan	August 4–8, 2018	114	120 km/h (75 mph)	960 hPa (28.35 inHg)	Mariana Islands, Japan	$866,000	None	
Man-yi	November 22–25, 2018	78	150 km/h (90 mph)	960 hPa (28.35 inHg)	Caroline Islands	None	None	
Francisco	August 5, 2019	15	130 km/h (80 mph)	970 hPa (28.64 inHg)	Japan, Korean Peninsula	Unknown	1	
Krosa	August 7–11, 2019	90	140 km/h (85 mph)	960 hPa (28.35 inHg)	Mariana Islands, Japan	$20.5 million	3	
Tapah	September 20–21, 2019	30	120 km/h (75 mph)	970 hPa (28.64 inHg)	Taiwan, Ryukyu Islands, East China, Korean Peninsula	$7.9 million	3	
Mitag	September 30 – October 1, 2019	30	140 km/h (85 mph)	965 hPa (28.50 inHg)	Taiwan, East China, Ryukyu Islands, South Korea	$816 million	22	
Neoguri	October 19–20, 2019	33	140 km/h (85 mph)	970 hPa (28.64 inHg)	None	None	None	
Nakri	November 8, 2019	12	120 km/h (75 mph)	975 hPa (28.79 inHg)	Philippines, Vietnam	$49.4 million	25	
Kalmaegi	November 18–19, 2019	30	140 km/h (85 mph)	960 hPa (28.35 inHg)	Philippines, Taiwan	$12.4 million	None	

=== 2020s ===
Name	System dates	Duration (hours)	Sustained wind speeds	Pressure	Areas affected	Damage (USD)	Deaths	Refs
Hagupit	August 3, 2020	18	130 km/h (85 mph)	975 hPa (28.79 inHg)	Ryukyu Islands, Taiwan, East China, Korean Peninsula	$411 million	17	
Chan-hom	October 7–9, 2020	54	130 km/h (85 mph)	965 hPa (28.50 inHg)	Japan	None	None	
Saudel	October 22–23, 2020	24	120 km/h (75 mph)	975 hPa (28.79 inHg)	Philippines, South China, Vietnam	$15.2 million	None	
Champi	June 25, 2021	12	120 km/h (75 mph)	980 hPa (28.94 inHg)	Mariana Islands	None	None	
Cempaka	July 19–20, 2021	18	130 km/h (80 mph)	980 hPa (28.94 inHg)	South China, Vietnam	$4.25 million	3	
Malou	October 27–28, 2021	69	140 km/h (85 mph)	965 hPa (28.50 inHg)	Bonin Islands	None	None	
Chaba	July 1–2, 2022	12	130 km/h (80 mph)	965 hPa (28.50 inHg)	South China, Central China, North China	Unknown	12	
Tokage	August 22–24, 2022	45	140 km/h (85 mph)	970 hPa (28.64 inHg)	None	None	None	
Merbok	September 14–15, 2022	24	130 km/h (80 mph)	965 hPa (28.50 inHg)	None	None	None	
Roke	September 29–30, 2022	18	130 km/h (80 mph)	975 hPa (28.79 inHg)	Daitō Islands	None	None	
Nesat	October 17 , 2022	66	140 km/h (85 mph)	965 hPa (28.50 inHg)	Philippines, Taiwan, South China, Vietnam, Cambodia, Laos	$8.15 million	None	
Guchol	June 8–11, 2023	96	140 km/h (85 mph)	970 hPa (28.64 inHg)	None	None	None	
Dora	August 12–13, 2023	36	140 km/h (85 mph)	980 hPa (28.94 inHg)	Wake Island	None	None	

== Climatology ==
Strong typhoons by month
Month	Number of storms
January	1
February	0
March	1
April	3
May	4
June	11
July	25
August	51
September	35
October	23
November	11
December	6

Strong typhoons by decade
Period	Number of storms
1976–79	0
1980s	0
1990s	63
2000s	58
2010s	45
2020s	5

== See also ==
- Typhoon
- Pacific typhoon season
- 2025 Pacific typhoon season
