= Tropical Storm Gaemi (2012) =

Pacific severe tropical storm in 2012

Severe Tropical Storm Gaemi (Marce)
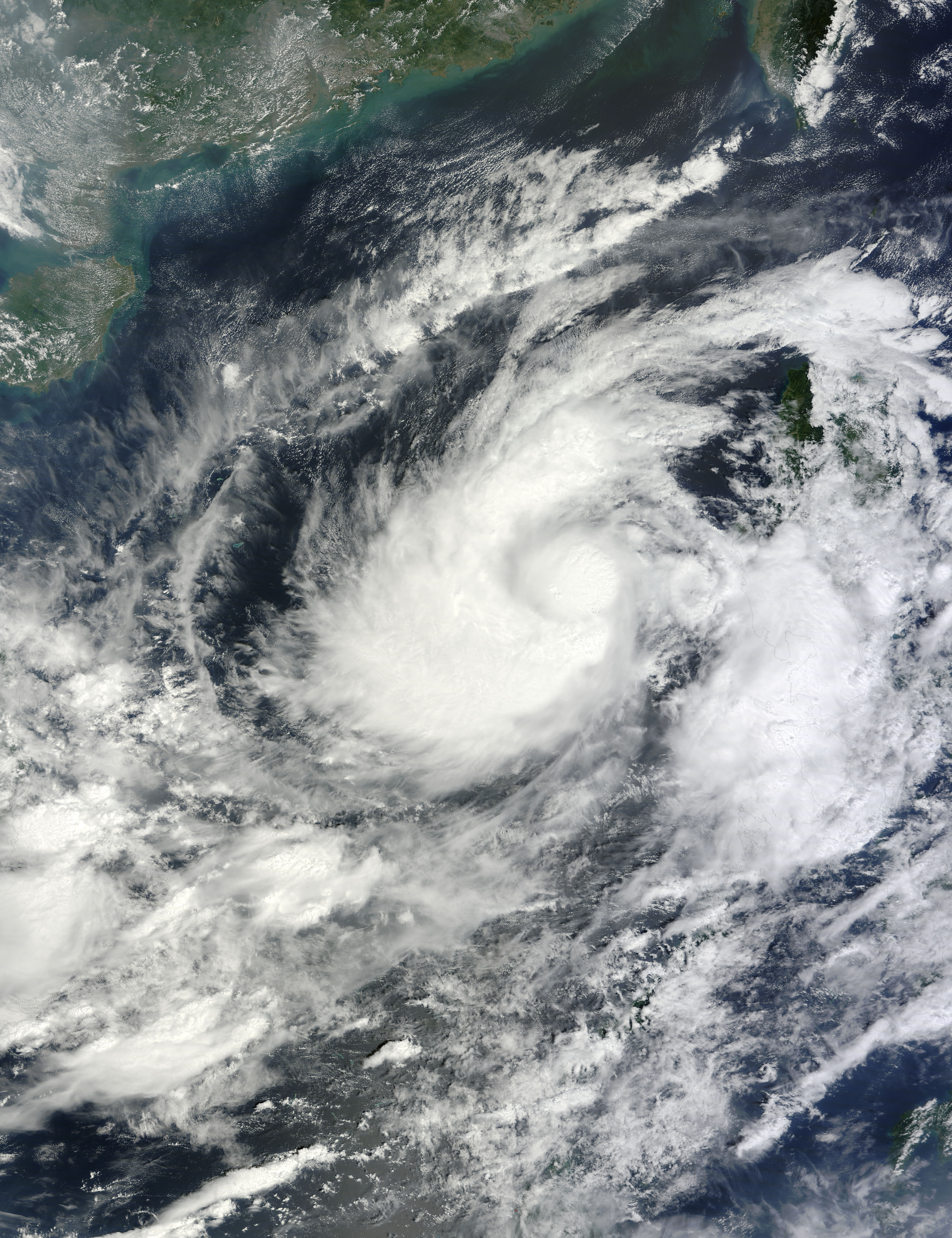
- Gaemi near peak intensity on October 3

Meteorological history
- Formed: September 29, 2012
- Dissipated: October 7, 2012

Severe tropical storm
- 10-minute sustained (JMA)
- Highest winds: 95 km/h (60 mph)
- Lowest pressure: 990 hPa (mbar); 29.23 inHg

Tropical storm
- 1-minute sustained (SSHWS/JTWC)
- Highest winds: 100 km/h (65 mph)
- Lowest pressure: 982 hPa (mbar); 29.00 inHg

Overall effects
- Casualties: 6 dead, 1 missing
- Damage: $4.1 million (2012 USD)
- Areas affected: Philippines, Vietnam, Cambodia, Laos
- IBTrACS /
- Part of the 2012 Pacific typhoon season

Severe Tropical Storm Gaemi, (Note: The name Gaemi (Korean: 개미, [ˈkɛ(ː)mi]) was contributed by South Korea and means ant in Korean.) known in the Philippines as Tropical Storm Marce, was an erratic tropical cyclone that affected the Philippines and Vietnam in early October 2012. The twentieth named storm of the annual typhoon season, Gaemi originated as an area of convection over the central South China Sea on September 29. The system went northeastward and slowly gaining strength. On October 1, the depression strengthened into Tropical Storm Gaemi as it turned southeastward. Gaemi briefly attained severe tropical storm status on October 3, but weakened back to a tropical storm later that day. On the next day, Gaemi turned west-southwest and continued to slowly weakened. The storm made landfall in southern Vietnam on October 6 and weakened to a tropical depression shortly after landfall, before dissipating on the next day over Cambodia.

As Gaemi meandered over the West Philippine Sea, it enhanced the southwest monsoon and brought rainfall to western Luzon and caused flooding. Storm surge in the region damaged houses and flooded bridges. Gaemi then struck southern Vietnam as a minimal tropical storm, and brought strong winds and heavy rainfall. Landslides occurred in Phú Yên province and blocked roads and bridges. The South Central Coast suffered from extensive crop damage. In total, Gaemi killed six people and left one other missing. Damage related to the storm accumulated US$4.12 million (2012 USD).

== Meteorological history ==
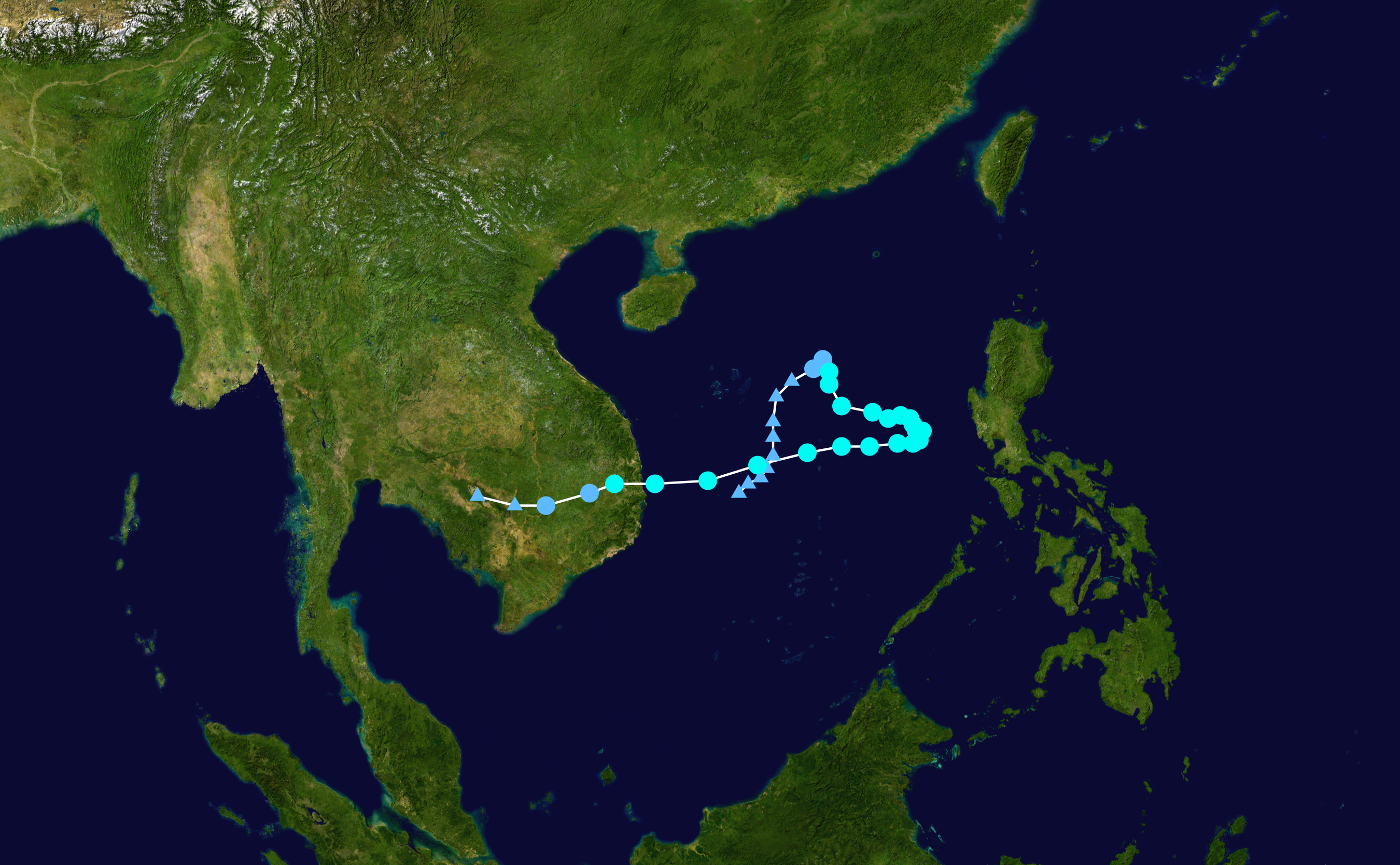
Map plotting the storm's track and intensity, according to the Saffir–Simpson scale Map key Saffir–Simpson scale Tropical depression (≤38 mph, ≤62 km/h) Tropical storm (39–73 mph, 63–118 km/h) Category 1 (74–95 mph, 119–153 km/h) Category 2 (96–110 mph, 154–177 km/h) Category 3 (111–129 mph, 178–208 km/h) Category 4 (130–156 mph, 209–251 km/h) Category 5 (≥157 mph, ≥252 km/h) Unknown Storm type Tropical cyclone Subtropical cyclone Extratropical cyclone, remnant low, tropical disturbance, or monsoon depression

On September 29, an area of convection presisted over the central South China Sea. The Japan Meteorological Agency (JMA) designated it as a tropical depression at 00:00 UTC. The center was well-organized with convection increased over the center. The system slowly drifted northeastward and continued to consolidate, which prompted the Joint Typhoon Warning Center (JTWC) issued a Tropical Cyclone Formation Alert (TCFA) on the next day. At 12:00 UTC October 1, the JMA upgraded the system to a tropical storm, and assigned the name Gaemi. The JTWC initiated advisory on Tropical Depression 21W three hours later, as deep convection formed over the southeast of the center. It benefited from warm sea surface temperature of 30 °C (86 °F) and good equatorward outflow. Steering current remained weak because a mid-latitude trough weakened a subtropical ridge over the southeastern China, and Gaemi remained almost stationary. Despite lacking deep convection over the northern part of the center, a scatterometer passed by and revealed that the system attained gale-force winds. As such, the JTWC upgraded it to a tropical storm at 21:00 UTC. Gaemi gradually strengthened under low wind shear and good equatorward outflow. The storm started to move southeastward as steered by a near-equatorial ridge to its south.

On October 2, Gaemi entered the Philippine Area of Responsibility (PAR), the Philippine Atmospheric, Geophysical and Astronomical Services Administration (PAGASA) began tracking the system and gave the local name Marce. Poleward outflow improved later that day, and Gaemi developed a central dense overcast. At 06:00 UTC October 3, Gaemi attained severe tropical storm status and attained peak intensity with winds of 95 km/h (60 mph) and a barometric pressure of 990 hPa (29.23 inHg) concurrently. However, the peak of Gaemi was short-lived as wind shear increased. Gaemi weakened to a tropical storm 12 hours later. Deep convection was sheared to the west, and the center became fully exposed. The storm turned sharply to the west on October 4, under the influence of a subtropical ridge to its north. Wind shear remained strong on October 5. The center was slightly elongated and remained fully exposed with deep convection being sheared to the west while moving west-southwest. Later that day, Gaemi left the PAR, and the PAGASA ceased monitoring the system. On October 6, Gaemi re-strengthened slightly as large area of deep convection concealed part of the center. At 18:00 ICT (11:00 UTC), Gaemi made landfall in Phú Yên province, near Tuy Hòa, as a minimal tropical storm. (Note: The NCHMF stated that Gaemi weakened to a tropical depression shortly before landfall, while the JMA still classified Gaemi as a tropical storm when it made landfall.) It weakened to a tropical depression just an hour after landfall. The JTWC issued its final advisory on the system later that day, though the JMA continued to track it. Gaemi dissipated on the next day over western Cambodia.

== Preparations and impact ==
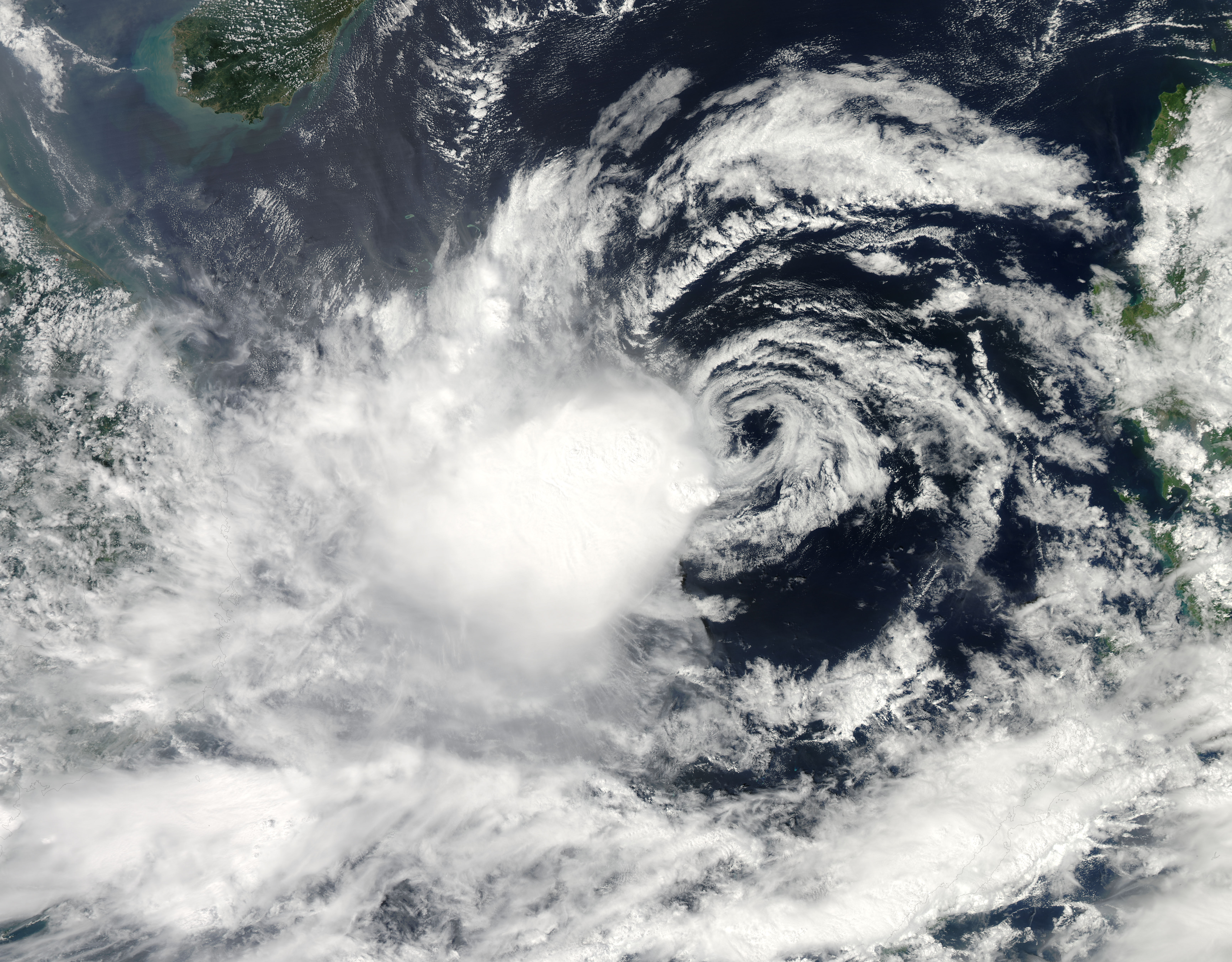
The disorganized Tropical Storm Gaemi approaching Vietnam on October 5

=== Philippines ===
As Gaemi approached the western Philippines, the PAGASA issued the PSWS #1 for Bataan and Zambales on October 3. The signals were cancelled on October 5 (local time) as Gaemi began to move away from the country. The government urged fishing vessels and other small ships to avoid going to the waters of western Luzon. Although Gaemi remained offshore, it enhanced the southwest monsoon and brought rainfall to Luzon. Many places in Metro Manila were affected by flooding. School classes in Calabarzon, Metro Manila and Central Luzon were suspended. 65 people were stranded in Cagayan, while another 32 were stranded in Isabela, due to adverse weather. Flooding were reported in Bataan and Zambales, but damages were minimal. A Storm surge slapped Calintaan, Occidental Mindoro, which destroyed five houses and damaged 23 others. 265 people were affected. A bridge in Sablayan was also affected and closed. Another storm surge hit San Antonio, Zambales. 23 houses were damaged and 32 people were affected. In Mariveles, Bataan, 14 students were trapped when they were mountaineering the Mount Mariveles. They were rescued by the Mariveles Rescue Team, Paramedics and the Philippine National Police. Two motorboats carrying three fishermen were capsized off the coast of Nasugbu, Batangas. One of the fishermen was found dead along the coast of Nasugbu. Overall impacts of Gaemi in the Philippines was minor.

=== Vietnam ===
In advance of Gaemi, people and soldiers built an emergency dike on the coast of Hương Trà. The cost of the dike was 200 million đồng (US$9,600) and was 200 m (660 ft) long. Seven provinces, mainly in the South Central Coast were affected by Gaemi. The government evacuated 20,000 people lived in Quảng Ngãi, Bình Định, and Phú Yên provinces. Heavy rains lashed Phú Yên province and excessive waters in a hydropower reservoir was discharged. Lý Sơn Island recorded sustained winds of 61 km/h (38 mph) with a gust of 76 km/h (47 mph). An Nhơn recorded sustained winds of 50 km/h (31 mph) with a gust of 65 km/h (40 mph), while Quy Nhon recorded sustained winds of 47 km/h (29 mph) with a gust of 58 km/h (36 mph). Rainfalls in South Central Coast reached 80–100 mm (3.1–3.9 in). An Khê recorded 256 mm (10.1 in), the highest rainfall across the country. Tuy Hòa and Ba Tơ district recorded rainfall of 133 mm (5.2 in) and 128 mm (5.0 in) respectively. Extensive crops damage were reported in Quảng Nam and Quảng Ngãi provinces. In Phù Ninh district, a young man was swept away by floodwaters and went missing. Landslides were reported in Phú Yên province. Bridges and roads were blocked. 490 houses were flooded in Ea Súp district. Nearly 1,800 ha (4,400 acres) of crops were damaged, while 12 ha (30 acres) of fish pounds were lost, resulted in a damage of 5 billion đồng (US$240,000). Another young man died after falling into a stream in Ea H'leo district. A total of 263 ha (650 acres) of rice field and 2,367 ha (5,850 acres) of crops were damaged by Gaemi. Preliminary loss from the storm was calculated at 35 billion đồng (US$1.7 million). Across the country, Gaemi killed five people, injured four and left one other missing. 7.862 people were affected by the storm. 16 houses were collapsed or washed away, while 103 others were damaged. Total damage in Vietnam reached 86.1 billion đồng (US$4.1 million).

== See also ==
- Other tropical cyclones named Gaemi
- Other tropical cyclones named Marce
- Typhoon Lingling (2001)
- Tropical Storm Chanthu (2004)
- Typhoon Mirinae (2009)
- Tropical Storm Sinlaku (2014)
- Typhoon Damrey (2017)
- Typhoon Nakri (2019)
- Tropical Storm Etau (2020)
