= List of storms named Marce =

The name Marce has been used for six tropical cyclones in the Philippine Area of Responsibility by PAGASA in the Western Pacific Ocean.

- Typhoon Aere (2004) (T0417, 20W, Marce) – approached Taiwan and struck China
- Typhoon Sinlaku (2008) (T0813, 15W, Marce) – struck Taiwan and approached Japan
- Severe Tropical Storm Gaemi (2012) (T1220, 21W, Marce) – erratic storm that struck Vietnam
- Severe Tropical Storm Tokage (2016) (T1625, 29W, Marce) – struck the Philippines
- Severe Tropical Storm Dolphin (2020) (T2012, 14W, Marce) – did not make landfall
- Typhoon Yinxing (2024) (T2422, 24W, Marce) – impacted the Philippines before later affecting Vietnam

Preceded by Lekep	Pacific typhoon season names Marce	Succeeded by Nanolay
