= Typhoon Kaemi (2006) =

Pacific typhoon in 2006

Typhoon Kaemi (Glenda)
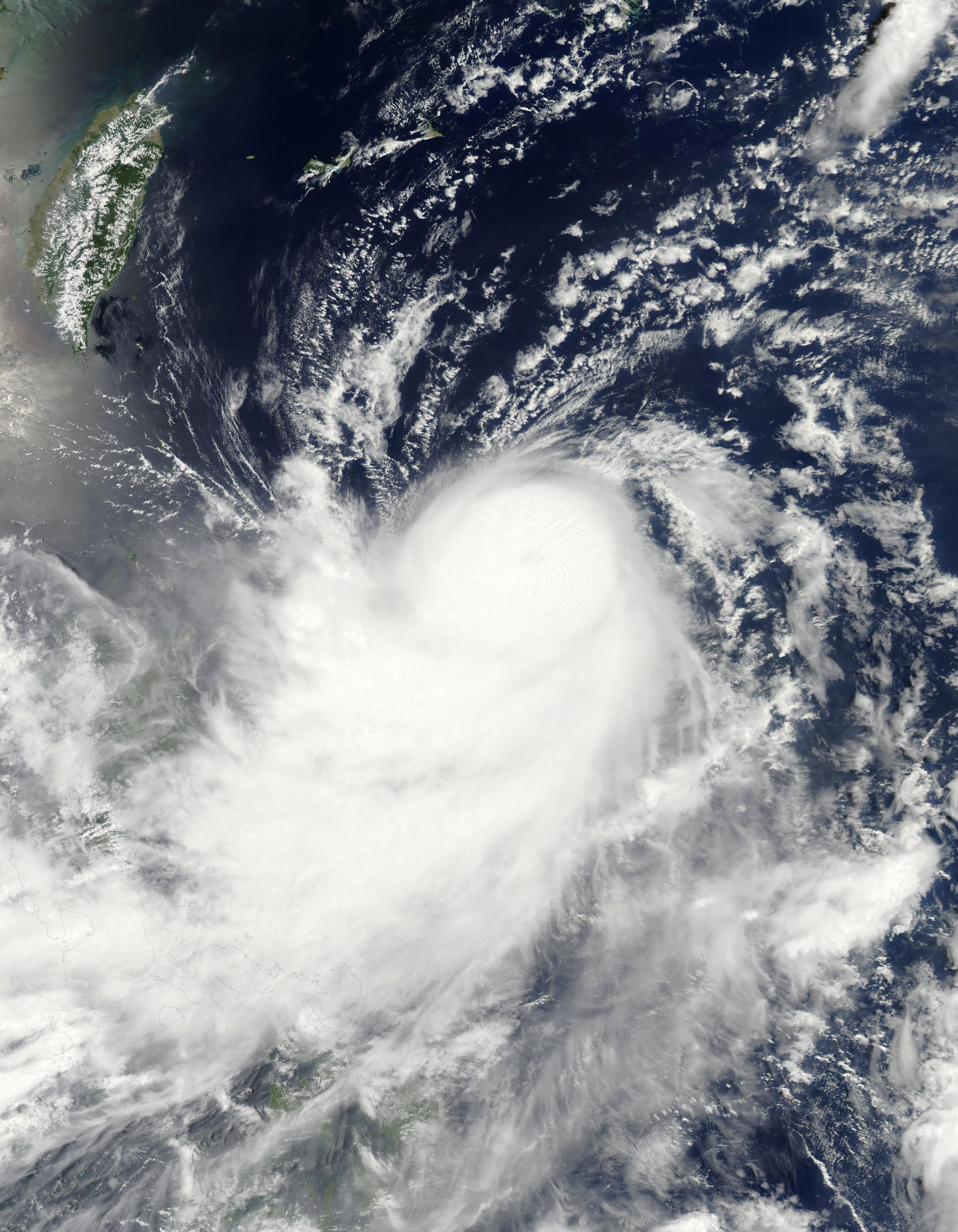
- Typhoon Kaemi shortly before peak intensity on July 23

Meteorological history
- Formed: July 17, 2006
- Dissipated: July 27, 2006

Typhoon
- 10-minute sustained (JMA)
- Highest winds: 150 km/h (90 mph)
- Lowest pressure: 960 hPa (mbar); 28.35 inHg

Category 1-equivalent typhoon
- 1-minute sustained (SSHWS/JTWC)
- Highest winds: 140 km/h (85 mph)
- Lowest pressure: 967 hPa (mbar); 28.56 inHg

Overall effects
- Fatalities: 32
- Damage: $450 million (2006 USD)
- Areas affected: Caroline Islands, Mariana Islands, Taiwan and China
- Part of the 2006 Pacific typhoon season

Typhoon Kaemi, (Note: The name Kaemi (Korean: 개미, [ˈkɛ(ː)mi]) was contributed by South Korea and means ant in Korean.) known in the Philippines as Typhoon Glenda, was a typhoon that struck Taiwan and China in mid-July 2006. Kaemi killed at least 32 people in China.

== Meteorological history ==
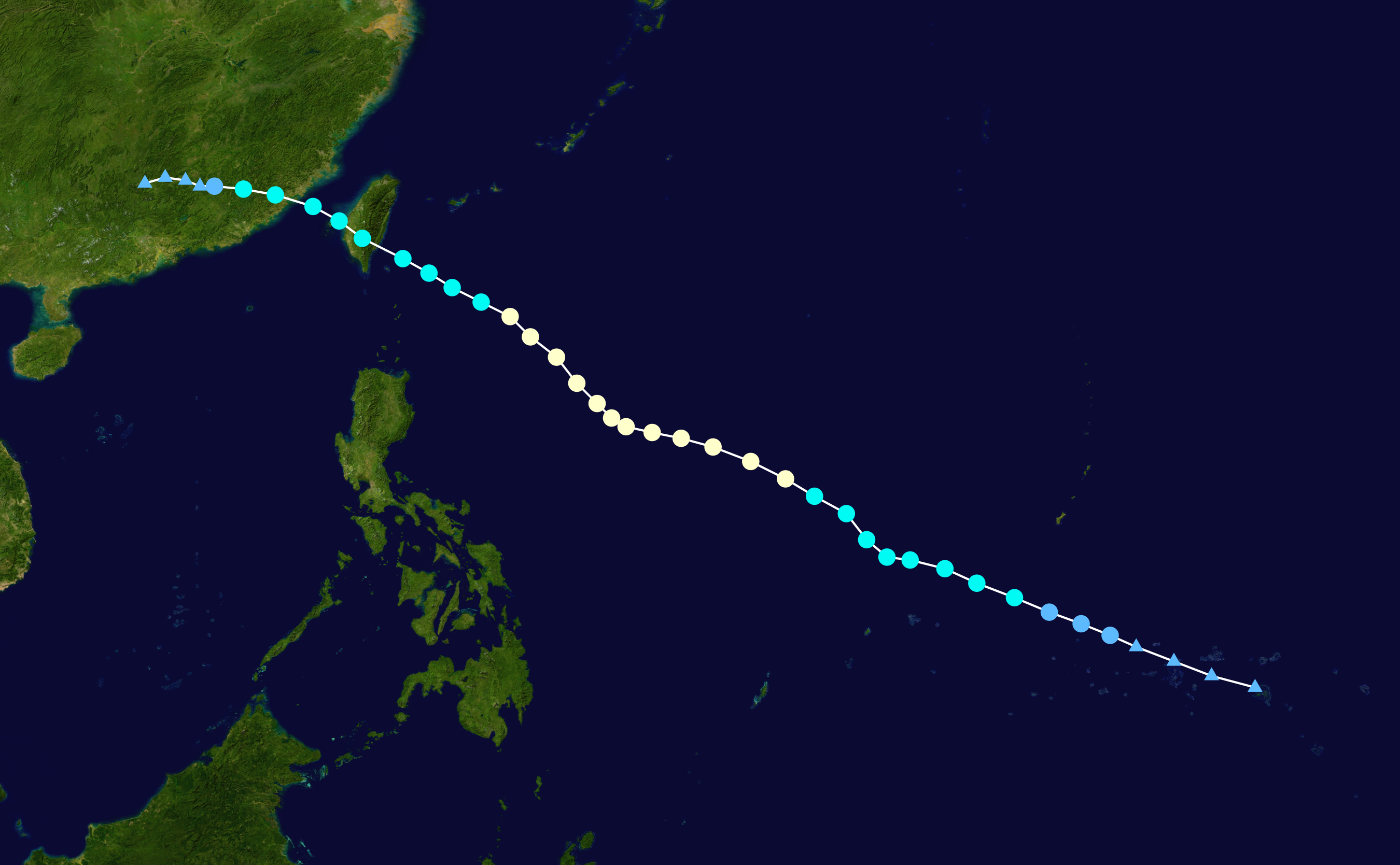
Map plotting the storm's track and intensity, according to the Saffir–Simpson scale Map key Saffir–Simpson scale Tropical depression (≤38 mph, ≤62 km/h) Tropical storm (39–73 mph, 63–118 km/h) Category 1 (74–95 mph, 119–153 km/h) Category 2 (96–110 mph, 154–177 km/h) Category 3 (111–129 mph, 178–208 km/h) Category 4 (130–156 mph, 209–251 km/h) Category 5 (≥157 mph, ≥252 km/h) Unknown Storm type Tropical cyclone Subtropical cyclone Extratropical cyclone, remnant low, tropical disturbance, or monsoon depression

A tropical depression formed on July 18, 2006, near the Caroline Islands and it quickly strengthened to tropical storm strength the same day. On July 19, the storm was named Kaemi by the JMA in Japan. The name eventually would be corrected was Gaemi. Also, PAGASA named the storm Glenda. It strengthened into a severe tropical storm on July 20, and further deepened into a typhoon 24 hours later. Kaemi made landfall in Longhai, Zhangzhou, Fujian at 3:50 p.m. CST on July 25 as a minimal typhoon. Shortly thereafter, the JTWC issued its final warning about Kaemi, while the AMJ did the same the next day.

== Impact ==
In Taiwan, heavy rainfall caused flooding and four minor injuries. Also, in the northern Philippines, rain fell heavily. The storm has also killed at least 32 people in China, while another 60 people are missing. Agricultural losses in Taiwan amounted to NT$73 million (US$2.2 million). Total damages from Kaemi amounted to $450 million.

== See also ==
- Other tropical cyclones named Kaemi
- Other tropical cyclones named Glenda
- 2006 Pacific typhoon season
- Typhoon Prapiroon (2006)
