= List of storms named Prapiroon =

The name Prapiroon (Thai: พระพิรุณ, [pʰráʔ.pʰí(ʔ).rūn]) has been used for five tropical cyclones in the western North Pacific Ocean. The name was contributed by Thailand and refers to Varuna, a Hindu god of sea and rain, in Thai.

- Typhoon Prapiroon (2000) (T0012, 20W, Lusing) – a costly typhoon that affected the Ryukyu Islands and the Korean Peninsula.
- Typhoon Prapiroon (2006) (T0606, 07W, Henry) – a moderate but deadly Category 1-typhoon that affected China.
- Typhoon Prapiroon (2012) (T1221, 22W, Nina) – a Category 3-typhoon that remained out at sea.
- Typhoon Prapiroon (2018) (T1807, 09W, Florita) – a Category 1-typhoon that impacted Japan and South Korea.
- Severe Tropical Storm Prapiroon (2024) (T2404, 04W, Butchoy) – a moderate tropical storm that struck Hainan and Vietnam.

Preceded by Gaemi	Pacific typhoon season names Prapiroon	Succeeded by Maria
