= List of storms named Gaemi =

The names Gaemi and Kaemi (Korean: 개미, [ˈkɛ(ː)mi]) have been used for five tropical cyclones in the West Pacific Ocean. (Note: The variant Kaemi was used in 2000 and 2006 before the spelling was corrected by the ESCAP/WMO Typhoon Committee.) The name, contributed by South Korea, means ant in Korean.

- Tropical Storm Kaemi (2000) (T0011, 19W) – killed 22 people in Indochina.
- Typhoon Kaemi (2006) (T0605, 06W, Glenda) – struck Taiwan and China.
- Severe Tropical Storm Gaemi (2012) (T1220, 21W, Marce) – affected Vietnam and Philippines.
- Tropical Storm Gaemi (2018) (T1806, 08W, Ester) – affected Taiwan and the Ryukyu Islands.
- Typhoon Gaemi (2024) (T2403, 05W, Carina) – impacted Taiwan and East China, also drenched the Philippines.

== See also ==
Storms with similar names

- Cyclone Kimi (2021) – a Category 1 Australian region tropical cyclone.
- Typhoon Maemi (2003) – the most powerful typhoon on record to strike South Korea.

== Notes ==
Preceded by Maliksi	Pacific typhoon season names Gaemi	Succeeded by Prapiroon
