= Typhoon Aere (2004) =

Pacific typhoon in 2004

Typhoon Aere (Marce)
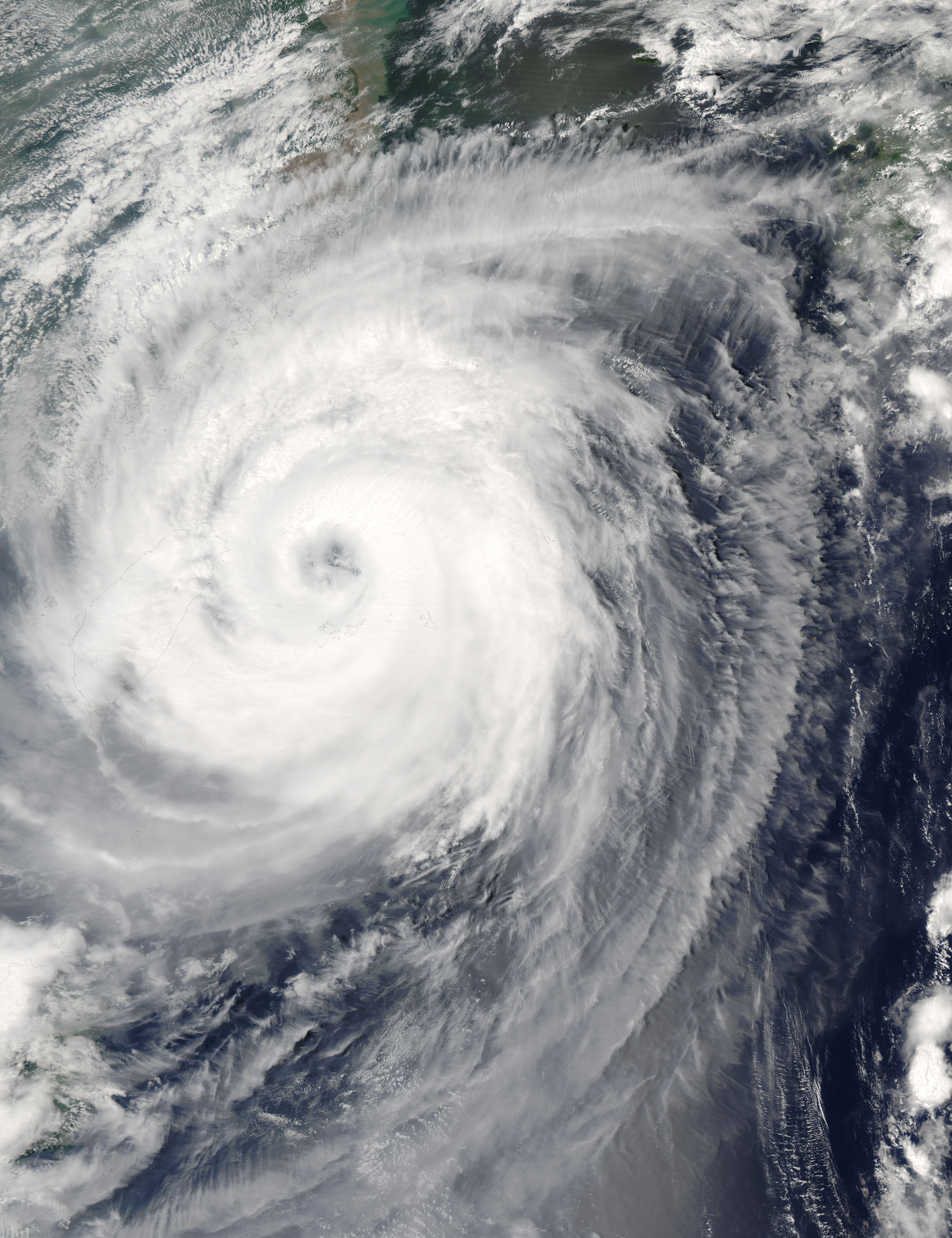
- Aere at peak intensity on August 24

Meteorological history
- Formed: August 17, 2004
- Dissipated: August 31, 2004

Typhoon
- 10-minute sustained (JMA)
- Highest winds: 150 km/h (90 mph)
- Lowest pressure: 955 hPa (mbar); 28.20 inHg

Category 2-equivalent typhoon
- 1-minute sustained (SSHWS/JTWC)
- Highest winds: 165 km/h (105 mph)
- Lowest pressure: 976 hPa (mbar); 28.82 inHg

Overall effects
- Fatalities: 107 direct
- Damage: $313,000 (2004 USD)
- Areas affected: Ryukyu Islands; Taiwan; China
- IBTrACS
- Part of the 2004 Pacific typhoon season

Typhoon Aere, (Note: The name Aere (Marshallese: aere, [æ.jɛ.rˠɛj]) was contributed by the United States and means storm in Marshallese.) known in the Philippines as Typhoon Marce, was a mid-season category two typhoon that brought severe damage to Taiwan and the People's Republic of China in late August 2004.

== Meteorological history ==
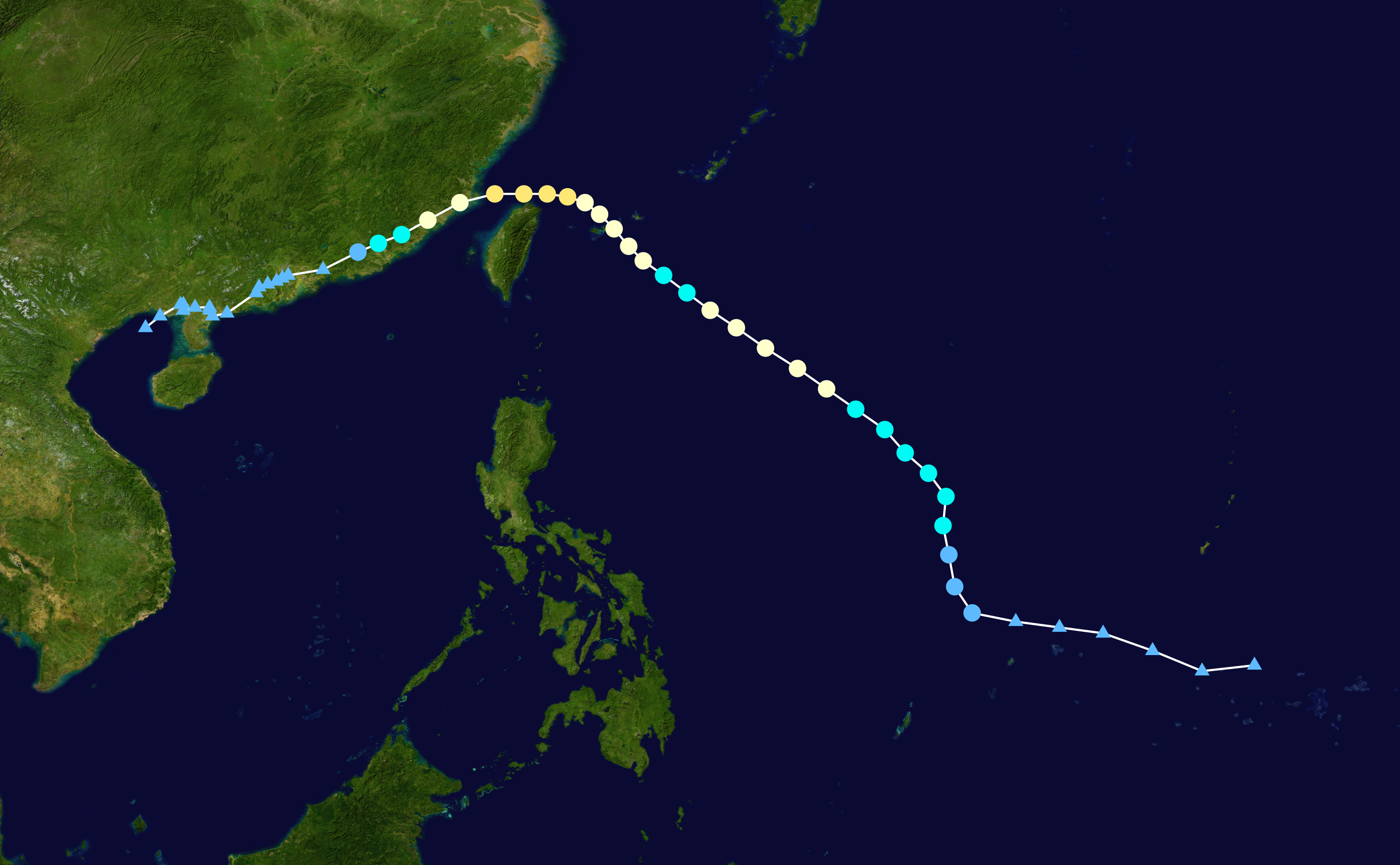
Map plotting the storm's track and intensity, according to the Saffir–Simpson scale Map key Saffir–Simpson scale Tropical depression (≤38 mph, ≤62 km/h) Tropical storm (39–73 mph, 63–118 km/h) Category 1 (74–95 mph, 119–153 km/h) Category 2 (96–110 mph, 154–177 km/h) Category 3 (111–129 mph, 178–208 km/h) Category 4 (130–156 mph, 209–251 km/h) Category 5 (≥157 mph, ≥252 km/h) Unknown Storm type Tropical cyclone Subtropical cyclone Extratropical cyclone, remnant low, tropical disturbance, or monsoon depression

An area of convection developed approximately 250 miles east of Pohnpei late on August 13. By August 16, the disturbance had passed 40 miles north of Chuuk. It developed enough organization to be designated a tropical depression on August 19, about 400 miles west of Guam. From there, it moved northwest at 12 mph along the southwestern periphery of a mid-level steering ridge. The system reached tropical storm status on August 20, gaining the name Aere.

Aere subsequently crossed into the Philippine Area of Responsibility, and was assigned the name Marce. Tropical Storm Aere was upgraded to typhoon intensity on August 21, and its strength leveled off during August 21 and August 22. On August 23, the typhoon was briefly downgraded to a tropical storm due to vertical wind shear while located 200 miles south of Naha, Okinawa. Aere quickly regained typhoon status and maintained its intensity for the rest of August 23 and developed a 50-mile wide eye. The tropical cyclone reached its peak intensity of 85 kn (98 mph) late on August 24, when the pressure lowered to 955 mb.

As the storm crossed the northern tip of Taiwan, it began to weaken. Typhoon Aere turned west-southwestward on August 25 and made its closest approach to Taipei, Taiwan, passing only 30 miles to the city's north. Aere turned southwestward later that day, a trajectory that carried the storm past Xiamen early the next day and close to Shantou later that day before weakening to tropical storm intensity. The remnants of Typhoon Aere remained a tropical depression until August 31.

== Preparations ==
=== Philippines ===
In Manila, several schools and most office work were temporarily suspended on August 26. At least two flights to Taiwan were cancelled. 27 people had to be evacuated from a swollen river near San Mateo.

=== Taiwan ===
Schools and financial markets in Taiwan were closed, as well as all government agencies. At least 5,000 people were evacuated from Central Taiwan. Several planes set to fly from Taoyuan International Airport had to be grounded. Prime minister You Si-kun, who was returning from a trip to Latin America, had to land in Okinawa. Songshan Airport was shut down after a jetliner carrying a hundred passengers slid off the runway.

=== Hong Kong ===
All flights to Hong Kong via Cathay Pacific would be halted.

=== China ===
Over 249,000 people were evacuated from coastal regions where the typhoon was expected to affect. Additionally, close to 31,500 fishing boats were ordered back to port.

== Impact ==
=== Philippines ===
In San Mateo, a four-year old boy went missing after a landslide.

=== China ===
Flooding and uprooted metal barriers were recorded where the storm made landfall. A fishermen died when his small boat was flipped in rough seas.

=== Taiwan ===
A mudslide killed a family of four in Hsinchu County.

=== Japan ===
Two sisters, ages seven and twelve, were swept away by waves while swimming near the island of Amami Ōshima.

== Naming ==
Additionally, the name Kodo was replaced in 2002 without being used. The name Aere was chosen to replace the name.

== See also ==
- Other tropical cyclones named Aere
- Other tropical cyclones named Marce
- List of wettest tropical cyclones
- Typhoon Fitow
- Typhoon Matmo (2014)
- Typhoon Saola (2012)
