= 2012 Pacific typhoon season =

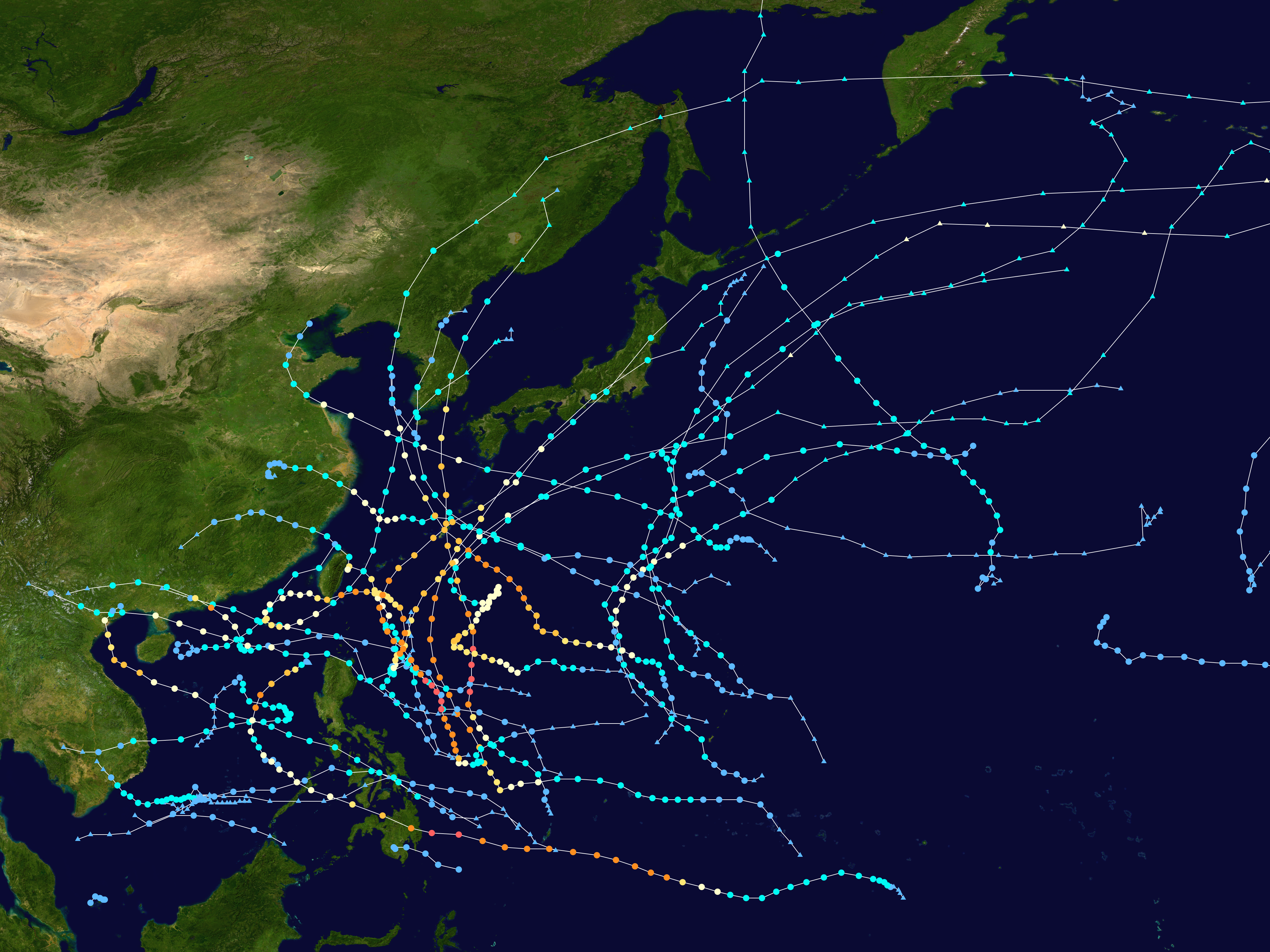
- Season summary map

Seasonal boundaries
- First system formed: January 13, 2012
- Last system dissipated: December 29, 2012

Strongest storm
- Name: Sanba
  - Maximum winds: 205 km/h (125 mph) (10-minute sustained)
  - Lowest pressure: 900 hPa (mbar)

Seasonal statistics
- Total depressions: 34
- Total storms: 25
- Typhoons: 14
- Very strong typhoons: 7
- Violent typhoons: 2
- ACE: 302.3 units
- Total fatalities: 2,523 total
- Total damage: $21.04 billion (2012 USD)

Related articles
- Timeline of the 2012 Pacific typhoon season; 2012 Atlantic hurricane season; 2012 Pacific hurricane season; 2012 North Indian Ocean cyclone season

The 2012 Pacific typhoon season was the second consecutive season to be a deadly and destructive season, primarily due to Typhoon Bopha which killed 1,901 people in the Philippines. It was a slightly above average season that produced 25 named storms, fourteen typhoons, and four super typhoons. It was an event in the annual cycle of tropical cyclone formation, in which tropical cyclones form in the western Pacific Ocean. The season ran throughout 2012, though most tropical cyclones typically develop between May and October. The season's first named storm, Pakhar, developed on March 28, while the season's last named storm, Wukong, dissipated on December 29. The season's first typhoon, Guchol, reached typhoon status on June 15, and became the first super typhoon of the year on June 17.

The scope of this article is limited to the Pacific Ocean, to the north of the equator between 100°E and the 180th meridian. Within the northwestern Pacific Ocean, there are two separate agencies that assign names to tropical cyclones, which can often result in a cyclone having two names. The Japan Meteorological Agency (JMA) will name a tropical cyclone should it be judged to have 10-minute sustained wind speeds of at least 65 km/h (40 mph) anywhere in the basin. PAGASA assigns unofficial names to tropical cyclones which move into or form as a tropical depression in their area of responsibility, located between 115°E–135°E and between 5°N–25°N, regardless of whether or not a tropical cyclone has already been given a name by the JMA. Tropical depressions that are monitored by the United States' Joint Typhoon Warning Center (JTWC) are given a numerical designation with a "W" suffix.

== Seasonal forecasts ==
Agency	Date	Tropical storms	Total Typhoons	Intense TCs (Note: The Tropical Storm Risk Consortium defines an intense typhoon as a typhoon with maximum 1-minute sustained winds greater than 175 km/h (110 mph).)	Ref
TSR	April 13, 2012	25.5	15.6	7.3	
STI	April 26, 2012	22 - 24	-	-	
TSR	May 4, 2012	25.5	15.6	8.5	
CWB	June 29, 2012	23 - 26	-	-	
TSR	July 9, 2012	26.8	16.7	9.2	
TSR	August 6, 2012	27.4	17.4	9.3	
	Forecast Center	Tropical storms	Typhoons	Ref	
Actual activity:	JMA	25	14		
Actual activity:	JTWC	25	16		

During February 2012, the Pacific El Niño/Southern Oscillation Applications Climate (PEAC) Center predicted that the first half of 2012 would see below-normal tropical cyclone activity, as the 2010–2012 La Niña event would prevent the monsoon trough of low pressure from developing normally and any major activity until June. They also suggested that weather patterns would return to near-normal afterwards and that the westward displacement of systems seen in the previous two seasons would not occur. On March 20, the Hong Kong Observatory predicted that the typhoon season in Hong Kong and surrounding areas would likely start in June as a result of the La Niña event. They also predicted that between 5 and 8 systems would pass within 500 km (310 mi) of the territory and possibly impact the territory. On April 11, the Tropical Storm Risk Consortium (TSR) issued its first seasonal forecast for the year, which predicted that the basin would be about 10% below average and feature 25.5 tropical storms, 15.6 typhoons, 7.3 intense typhoons. This was followed later that month by the Shanghai Typhoon Institute (STI), who predicted that between 22 and 24 tropical storms would develop within the basin during the year before TSR tweaked its forecast in May and predicted that the season would be near-normal and feature 8.5 intense typhoons.

On May 21, the Thai Meteorological Department predicted that 1-2 tropical storms would affect Thailand during 2012, with one moving through Vietnam and impacting upper Thailand during August or September, while the other one was expected to impact southern Thailand during October or November. On June 29, Taiwan's Central Weather Bureau (CWB) noted that sea surface temperatures had been gradually increasing and that there was a 50% chance of an El Nino event developing in the Pacific Ocean during the year. They also noted that systems tended to develop further away from Taiwan, had a longer lifespan and a greater intensity during El Nino events and urged citizens and local authorities to prepare. The CWB also predicted that 23 to 26 systems would occur over the basin during the year, of which three to five were expected to impact the island nation. Within its July update, TSR significantly increased its forecast as a result of the warmer sea surface temperatures and now predicted that the basin would see activity about 10% above average with 27.4 tropical storms, 16.7 typhoons, 9.2 intense typhoons. Within its July — December seasonal climate outlook, PAGASA predicted that 7 — 10 tropical cyclones were likely to develop within or enter the Philippine area of responsibility between July and September, while 4 — 7 were predicted to occur between October and December.

== Season summary ==
Costliest known Pacific typhoon seasons
Rank	Total damages	Season
1	$38.54 billion	2019
2	$38.06 billion	2023
3	$30.59 billion	2018
4	$29.62 billion	2024
5	$26.45 billion	2013
6	$21.05 billion	2012
7	$18.77 billion	2004
8	$17.44 billion	1991
9	$17.18 billion	2000
10	$16.96 billion	2016

As the year opened, the Japan Meteorological Agency was monitoring a tropical depression that was located about 345 km (215 mi) to the northeast of Kuala Lumpur, Malaysia; however, the system was last noted later that day as it dissipated.

On January 13, the JMA started monitoring a tropical depression that was located within an area of moderate to strong vertical windshear about 625 km (390 mi) to the east of Kuala Lumpur in Malaysia. During that day the depression remained near stationary, before the JMA issued their final advisory on the system during the next day as the system dissipated.

The season's first named storm, Pakhar, developed on March 28 while the last named storm, Wukong, dissipated on December 29. The season became very active between mid-July and mid-August, with nine named storms formed during the period. Vicente underwent explosive intensification and made landfall over the west Pearl River Delta as a strong typhoon. Damrey developed into a typhoon in the Yellow Sea and became the most intense tropical cyclone to make landfall north of the Yangtze River since 1949. Typhoon Haikui, although centred far away from the Philippines, killed at least 89 people in the country. Typhoon Tembin affected Taiwan twice because of its cyclonic loop.

From late August to September, three very powerful typhoons, Bolaven, Sanba and Jelawat, directly hit Okinawa Island successively. In October, the remnants of Severe Tropical Storm Gaemi arrived at the Bay of Bengal and re-intensified into a deep depression before making landfall over Bangladesh. In December, Typhoon Bopha, an unusually very low-latitude but very powerful tropical cyclone, caused catastrophic damage in Mindanao in the Philippines.

== Systems ==
=== Tropical Depression 01W ===
- Tropical depression (JMA)
- Tropical depression (SSHWS)
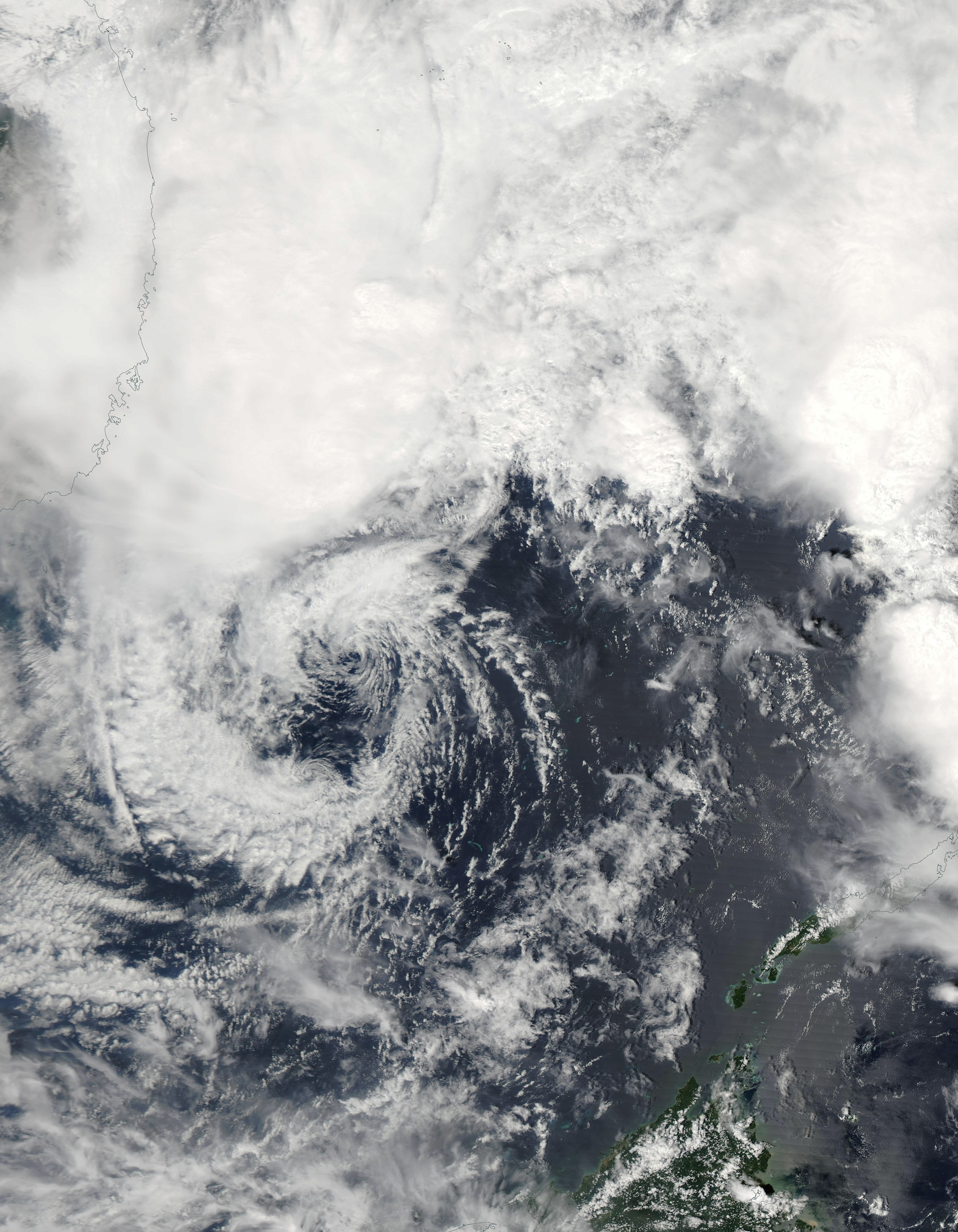
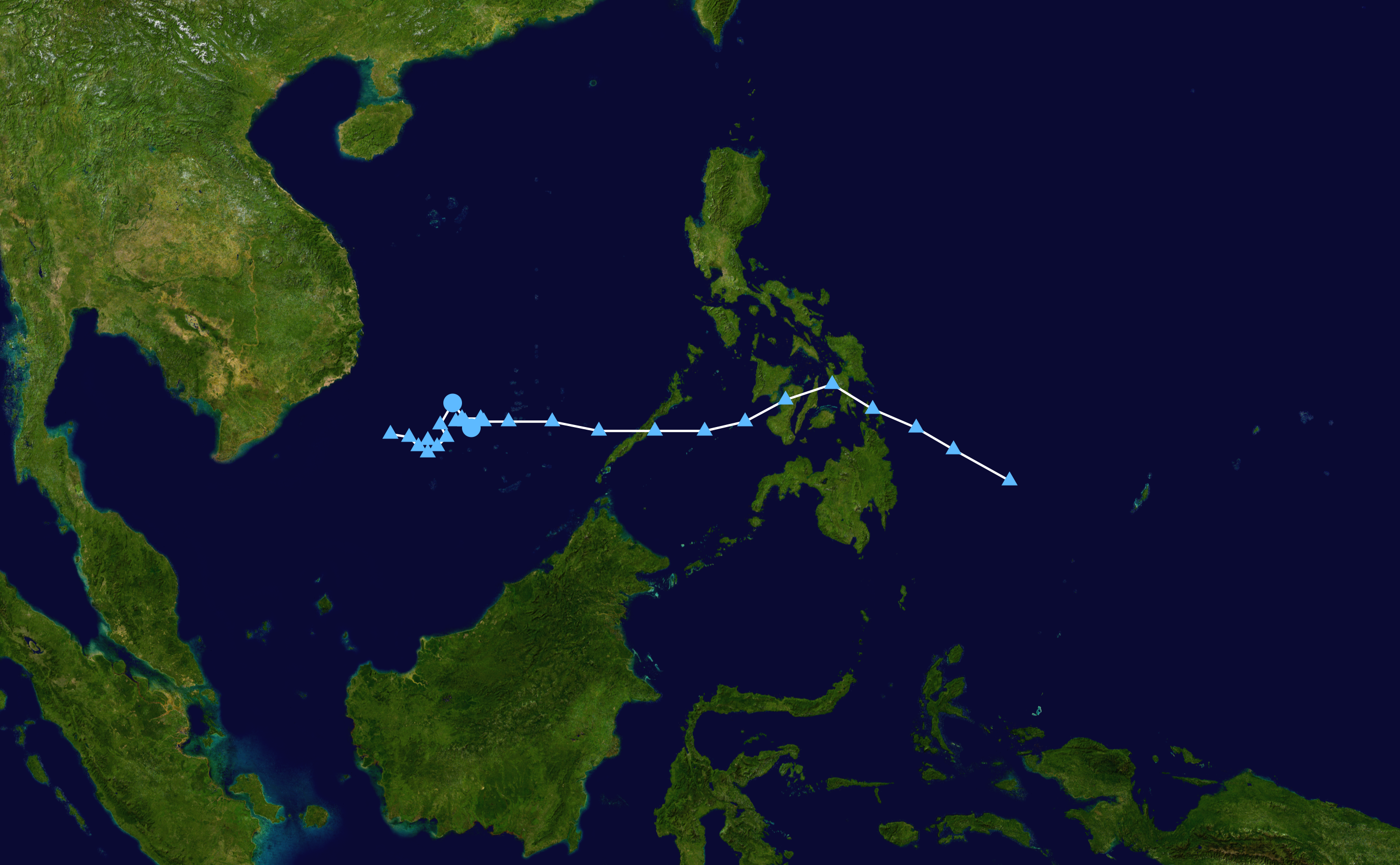
- Duration: February 17 – February 21
- Peak intensity: 55 km/h (35 mph) (10-min); 1004 hPa (mbar)

Early on February 17, the JMA reported that a tropical depression had developed, about 800 km (495 mi) to the southeast of Manila on the Philippine island of Luzon. During that day the depression moved westwards, before the Joint Typhoon Warning Center initiated advisories at 1500 UTC and designated the system as Tropical Depression 01W. However, six hours later the JTWC issued its final advisory as vertical windshear had started to increase, and after it had found no deep convection near the systems low level circulation centre during a reassessment of the depressions low level structure. Over the next few days the JMA continued to monitor the depression before it was last noted during February 20.

=== Tropical Storm Pakhar ===
- Tropical storm (JMA)
- Tropical storm (SSHWS)
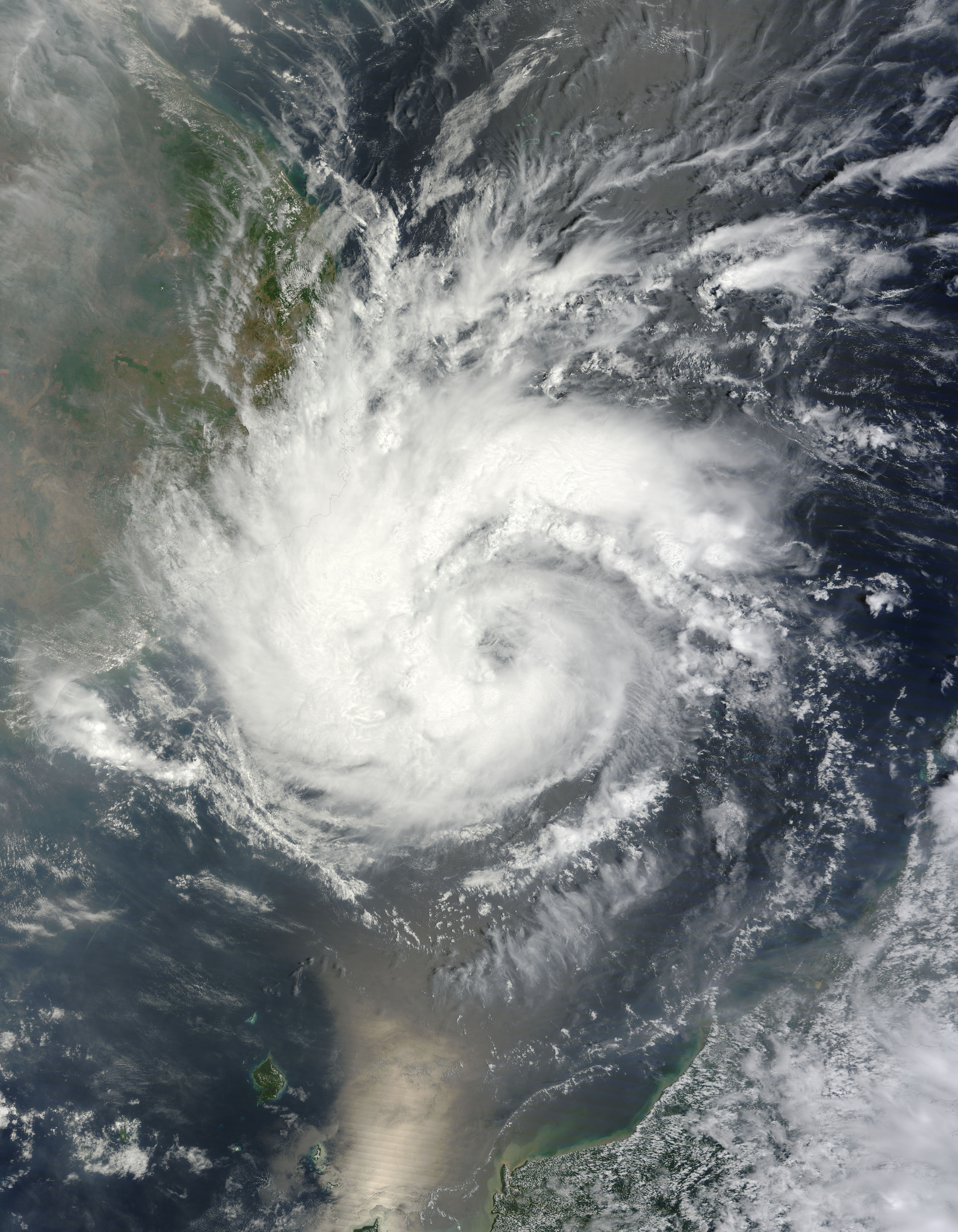
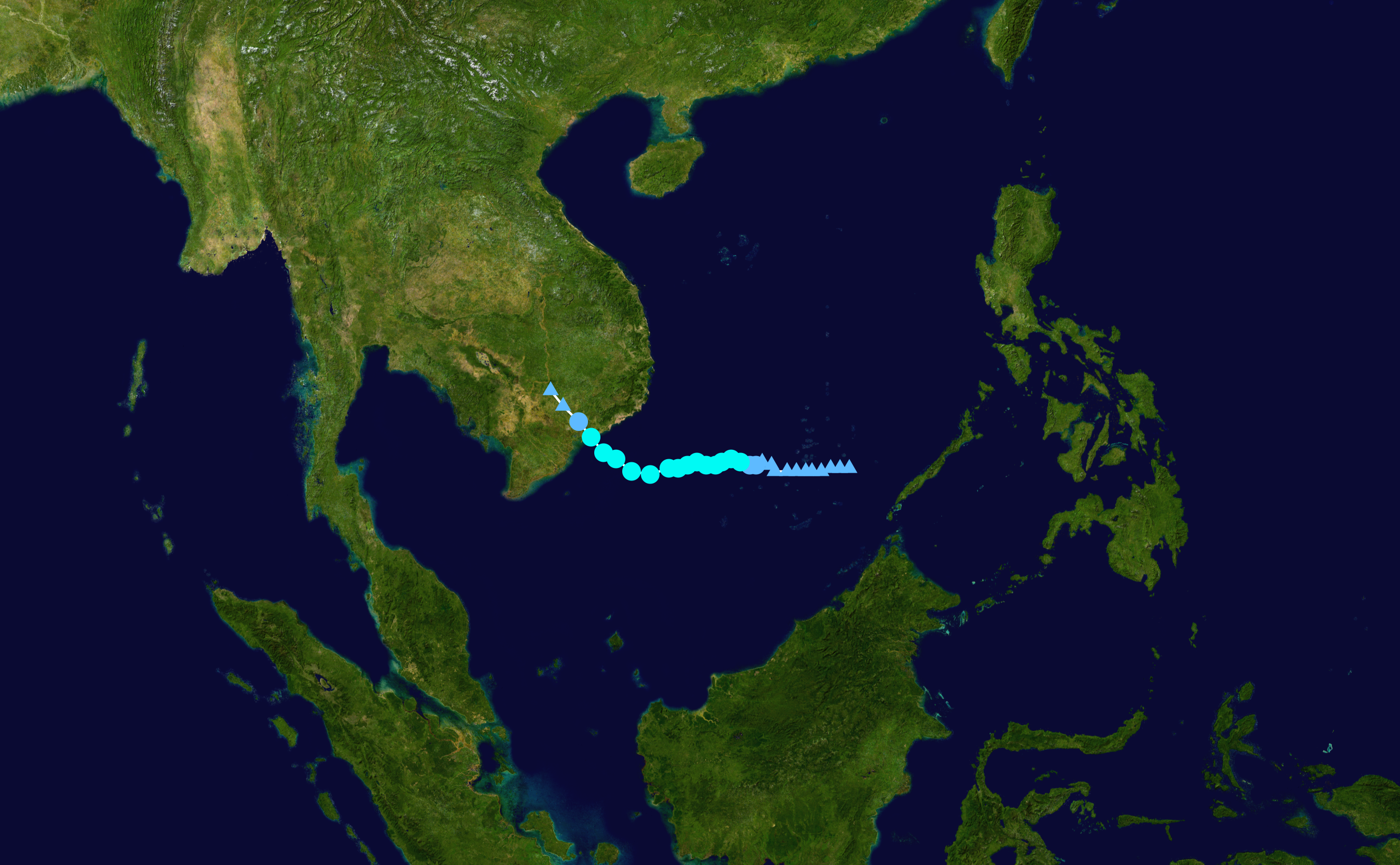
- Duration: March 26 – April 2
- Peak intensity: 75 km/h (45 mph) (10-min); 986 hPa (mbar)

On March 24, the JMA reported that a tropical depression had formed, about 250 mi (400 km) to the southwest of Manila, Philippines. It later weakened to a low pressure area late on the same day. Two days later, the JMA upgraded the tropical disturbance back to a tropical depression again, due to the storm reorganizing under an environment of low vertical wind shear and favorable sea surface temperatures in the South China Sea. Early on March 28, the JTWC issued a TCFA on the tropical depression. By the next day, the JMA upgraded the tropical depression to a tropical storm, and named it Pakhar. The JTWC subsequently started issuing advisories on the storm, as the storm's convection had completely wrapped around the circulation center. The JTWC later upgraded Pakhar into a tropical storm.

Early on March 30, the JTWC upgraded Pakhar to a Category 1 typhoon, as a banding eye formed; post-analysis later showed that Pakhar didn't reach typhoon intensity. Because of land interaction and colder sea surface temperatures, Pakhar weakened to a tropical storm by the next day. On April 1, Pakhar made landfall near Vũng Tàu, Vietnam. As it weakened into a tropical depression, the JMA issued their final advisory by the next day. The system was last noted over Cambodia that same day.

Although Pakhar did not affect the Philippines as a tropical cyclone, its precursor produced heavy rains across part of the nation. Flooding occurred in different parts of central and southern Luzon, and the northern Visayas region. In Basud, Camarines Norte, 128 families had to be evacuated due to flash flooding. A few landslides resulted from the rains, damaging or destroying a few homes. Throughout the affected region, five people were killed and three others were listed as missing. In Vietnam, ten people were killed and several others were injured due to flash flooding and high winds. The hardest hit area was Khánh Hòa Province where the storm made landfall. About 4,400 homes were damaged in the region by the storm and thousands of acres of rice paddy were flooded. In Ho Chi Minh City, officials reported that 600 homes and schools were destroyed. Total damage were finalized at ₫1.12 trillion (US$53.9 million). The remnants of the system brought rains to parts of Cambodia, Laos, and Thailand.

=== Severe Tropical Storm Sanvu ===
- Severe tropical storm (JMA)
- Category 1 typhoon (SSHWS)
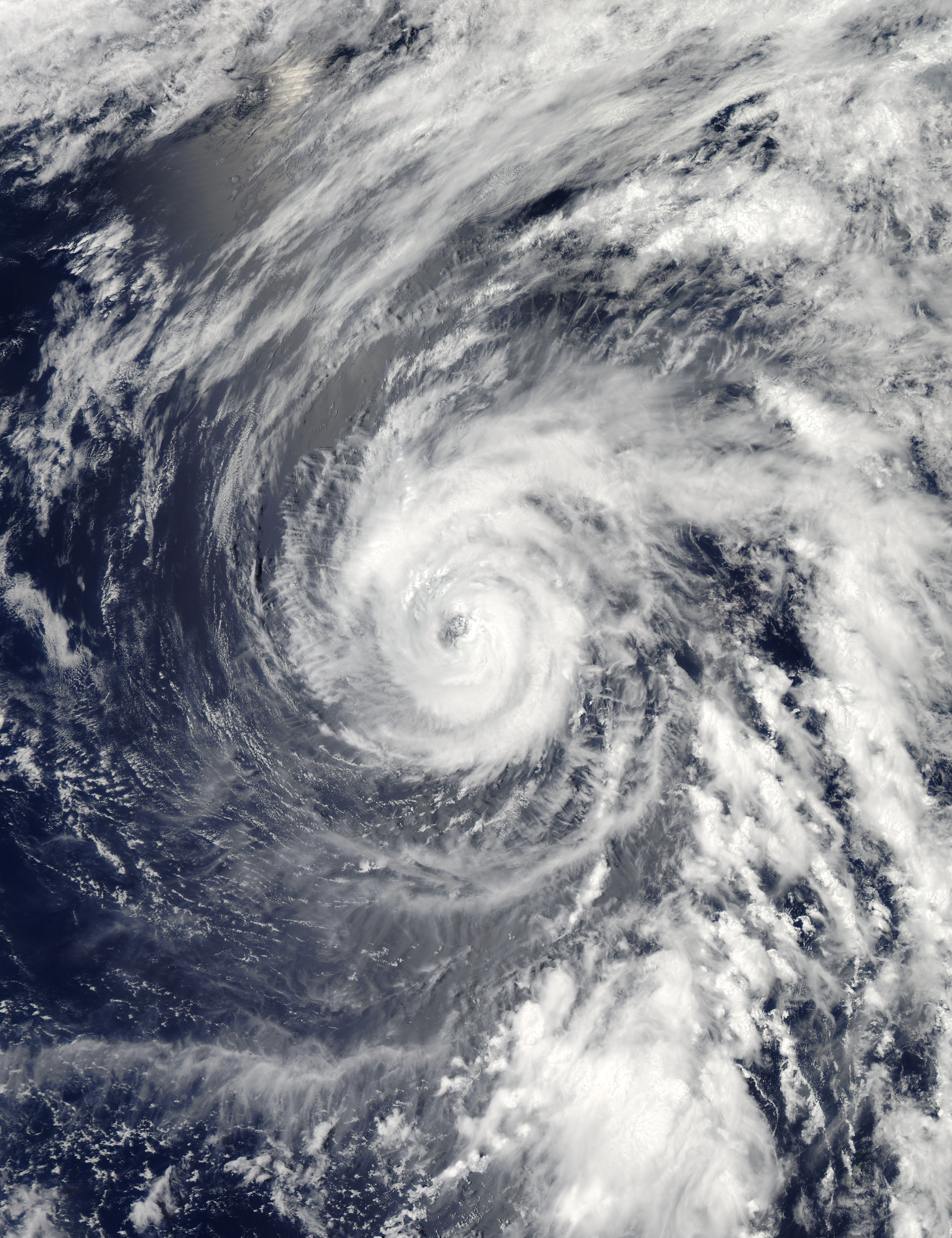
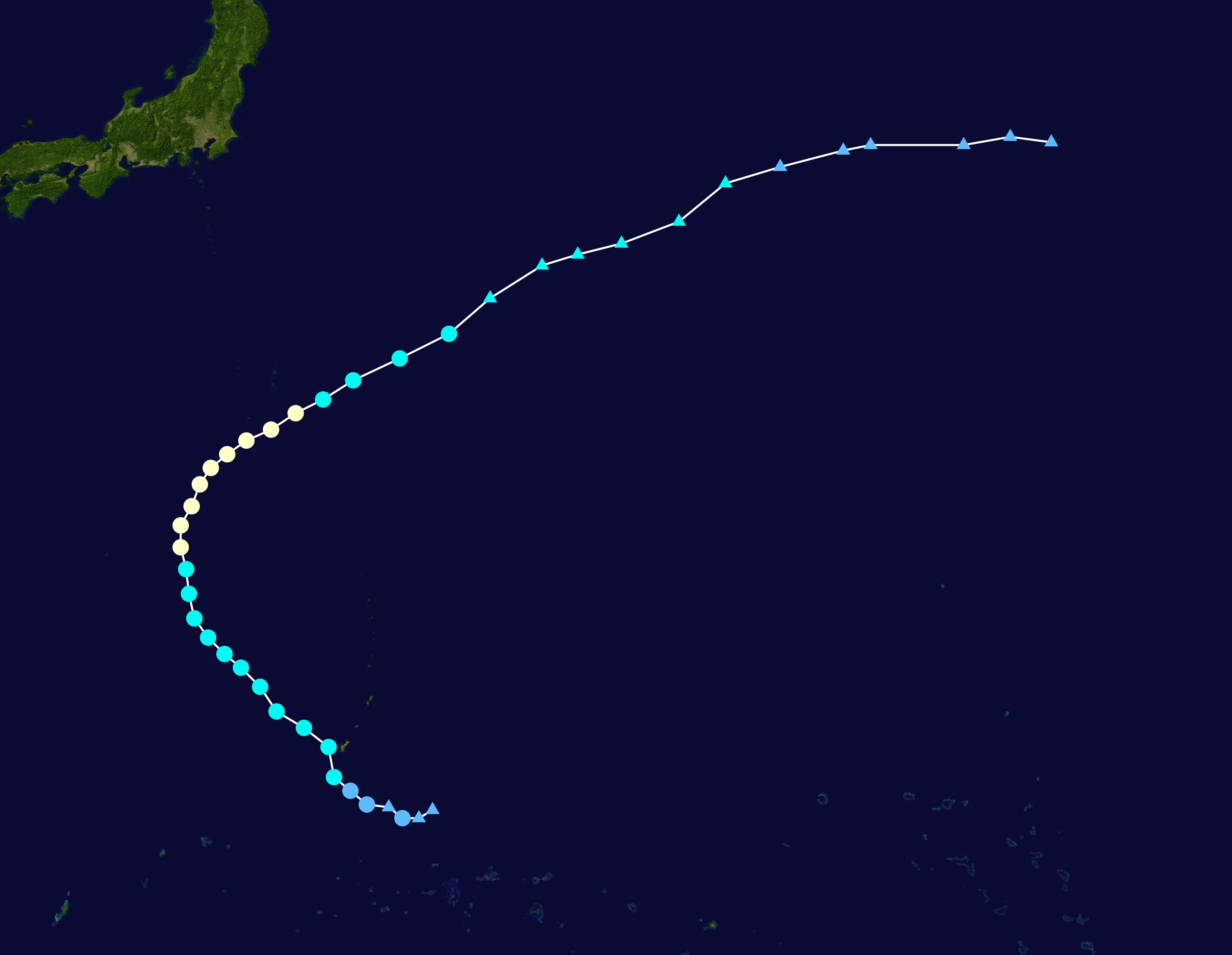
- Duration: May 20 – May 27
- Peak intensity: 110 km/h (70 mph) (10-min); 975 hPa (mbar)

On May 18, the JTWC started to monitor an area of convection approximately 95 nmi (175 km) to the north-northwest of Chuuk. At the time, it had a developing low-level circulation center with deep convection, and was under an environment of low vertical wind shear and good divergence aloft. As it moved northwestwards, it continued to organize, prompting the JTWC to issue a TCFA two days later. The JMA subsequently upgraded the system to a tropical depression on May 21. The JTWC later followed suit, designating the depression as 03W. The system then intensified to a tropical storm late on the same day, with the JMA naming it as Sanvu early on May 22. Sanvu then continued to intensify, with deep convection building over its center.

Late on the next day, the JTWC upgraded Sanvu to a category 1 typhoon, as an eye was seen on microwave imagery. Late on May 24, the JMA upgraded Sanvu to a severe tropical storm. Accelerating northeastward along the northwestern periphery of a subtropical ridge, the system reached its peak intensity by the next day, as its eye emerged on satellite imagery. As its western quadrant got affected by a dry air entrainment on May 26, Sanvu started to weaken as it directly passed over Iwo Jima. With strong vertical wind shear associated with a subtropical jet stream, along with rapidly cooling sea surface temperatures, the system continued to weaken. The JTWC downgraded Sanvu to a tropical storm late on the same day, as the system's low level circulation center started to become exposed. The JMA followed suit by the next day. The JTWC subsequently issued their final advisory on Sanvu, as it commenced extratropical transition. However, the JMA continued issuing advisories on Sanvu, until by the next day, when it fully transitioned into an extratropical cyclone. The remnants of the system was last noted during May 30.

As Sanvu strengthened into a tropical storm, tropical storm watches and warnings were issued for Guam, Rota, Tinian, and Saipan. It brought tropical storm force wind gusts and rainfall between 38–51 mm (1.5–2 in) to parts of Guam and the Northern Mariana Islands. However, the only damage reported was on Guam where falling tree limbs caused an estimated $20,000 of damage to power lines.

=== Typhoon Mawar (Ambo) ===
- Typhoon (JMA)
- Category 3 typhoon (SSHWS)
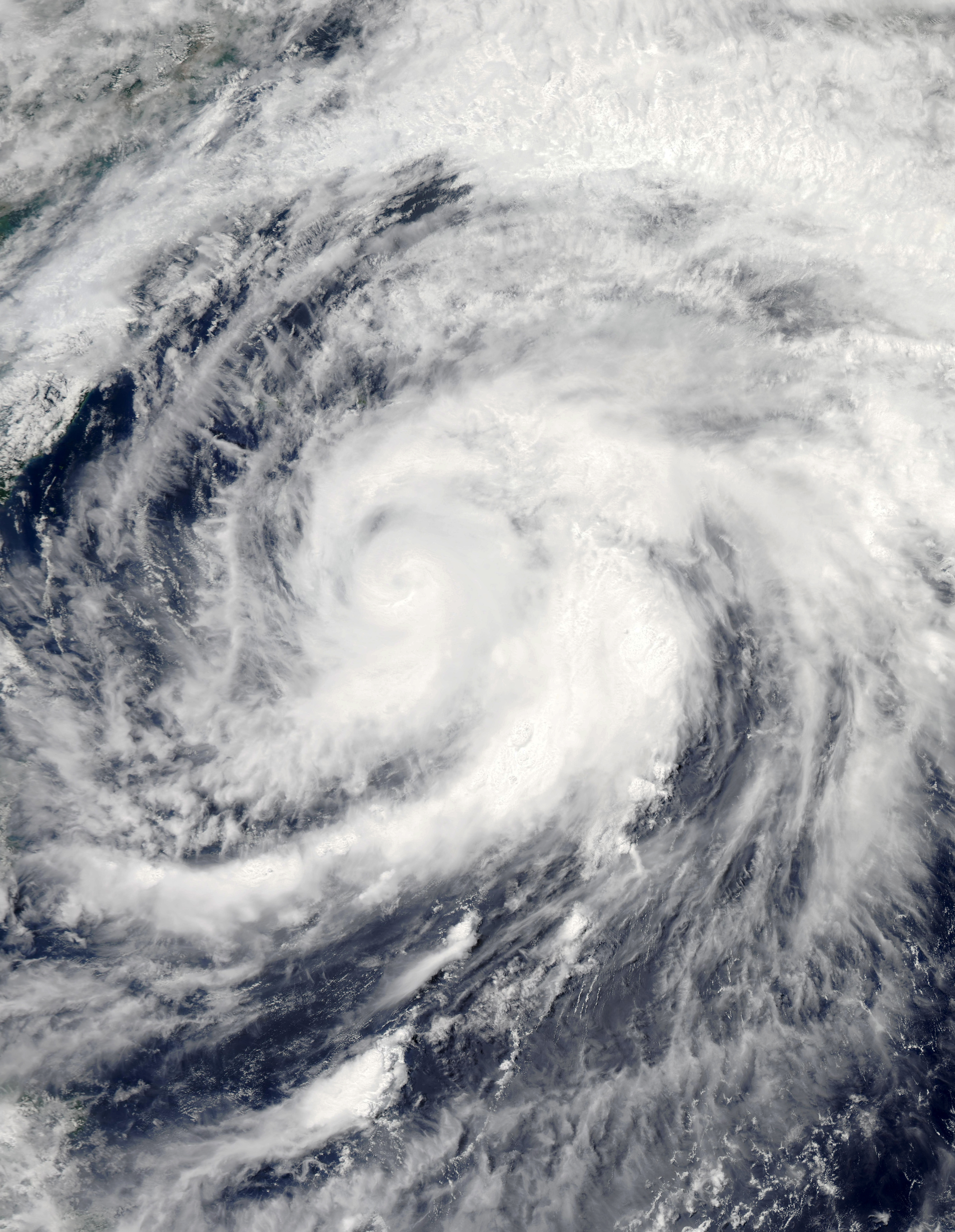
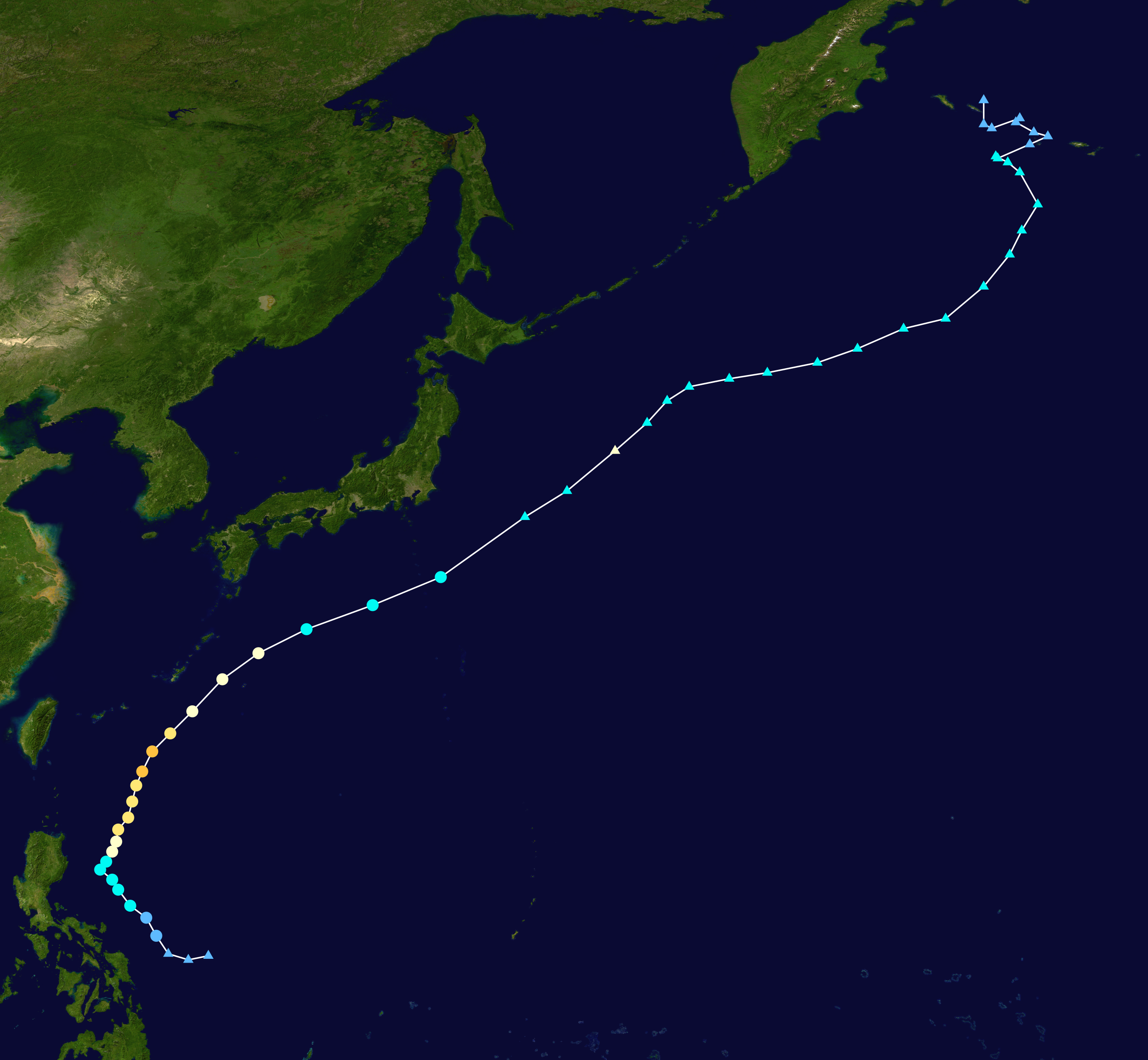
- Duration: May 31 – June 6
- Peak intensity: 140 km/h (85 mph) (10-min); 960 hPa (mbar)

On May 29, the JTWC started to monitor a tropical disturbance that formed approximately 125 nmi (230 km) to the north of Palau. At the time, the system had a weak low-level circulation center, and was under an environment of low to moderate vertical wind shear and good divergence aloft. As the disturbance began moving northwestwards, it started to organize, with deep convection building along its developing center. Late on the next day, the system's convection became significantly organized, prompting the JTWC to issue a TCFA. By May 31, the JMA had upgraded the system to a tropical depression. The PAGASA followed suit and started issuing advisories on the system, assigning its local name Ambo. Late on the same day, the JTWC began issuing advisories on the system as it continued to consolidate its center, designating it as 04W. By the next day, Ambo intensified into a tropical storm, with the JMA assigning its international name Mawar.

With warm sea surface temperatures and decreasing wind shear, Mawar developed a central dense overcast. This led to the JMA upgrading Mawar to a severe tropical storm on June 2. The JTWC subsequently upgraded it to a Category 1 typhoon as a developing eye feature was seen on microwave imagery. Turning northeastward as a mid-latitude trough weakened the subtropical ridge to the northeast, Mawar further intensified into a Category 2 typhoon early on the next day, as a ragged eye became visible on satellite imagery. The JMA followed suit and upgraded Mawar to a typhoon later that same day. By June 4, Mawar reached its peak intensity, before it started to weaken due to the mid-latitudes impacting the system's overall structure, with its eye breaking down into tight spiral banding, prompting the JTWC to downgrade the system to a category 2 typhoon. On the next day, the PAGASA issued their final advisory on Mawar, as it was exiting the Philippine Area of Responsibility. Mawar further weakened into a category 1 typhoon as its low-level circulation center widened, and was entering a hostile environment due to its interaction with the jet stream. The JMA subsequently downgraded Mawar to a severe tropical storm, as it commenced its extratropical transition. Late on the same day, the JTWC issued their final advisory on Mawar, as it was deeply embedded in the baroclinic zone and its low-level circulation center had decoupled behind its convection. On June 6, Mawar fully became an extratropical cyclone, and the JMA issued their final advisory on the system. The system was last noted east of the Kamchatka Peninsula on June 13.

Mawar brought torrential rain to parts of the Philippines including the Bicol Region while enhancing the southwest monsoon which triggered delays and cancelled of air flights. In Bicol region, more than 332 passengers were stranded at ports due to Mawar. Different domestic and international flights were forced to divert at Clark Air Base rather than NAIA due to bad weather. Some other flights were also cancelled. At least three were reported dead due to rains brought by Mawar.

=== Typhoon Guchol (Butchoy) ===
- Very strong typhoon (JMA)
- Category 4 super typhoon (SSHWS)
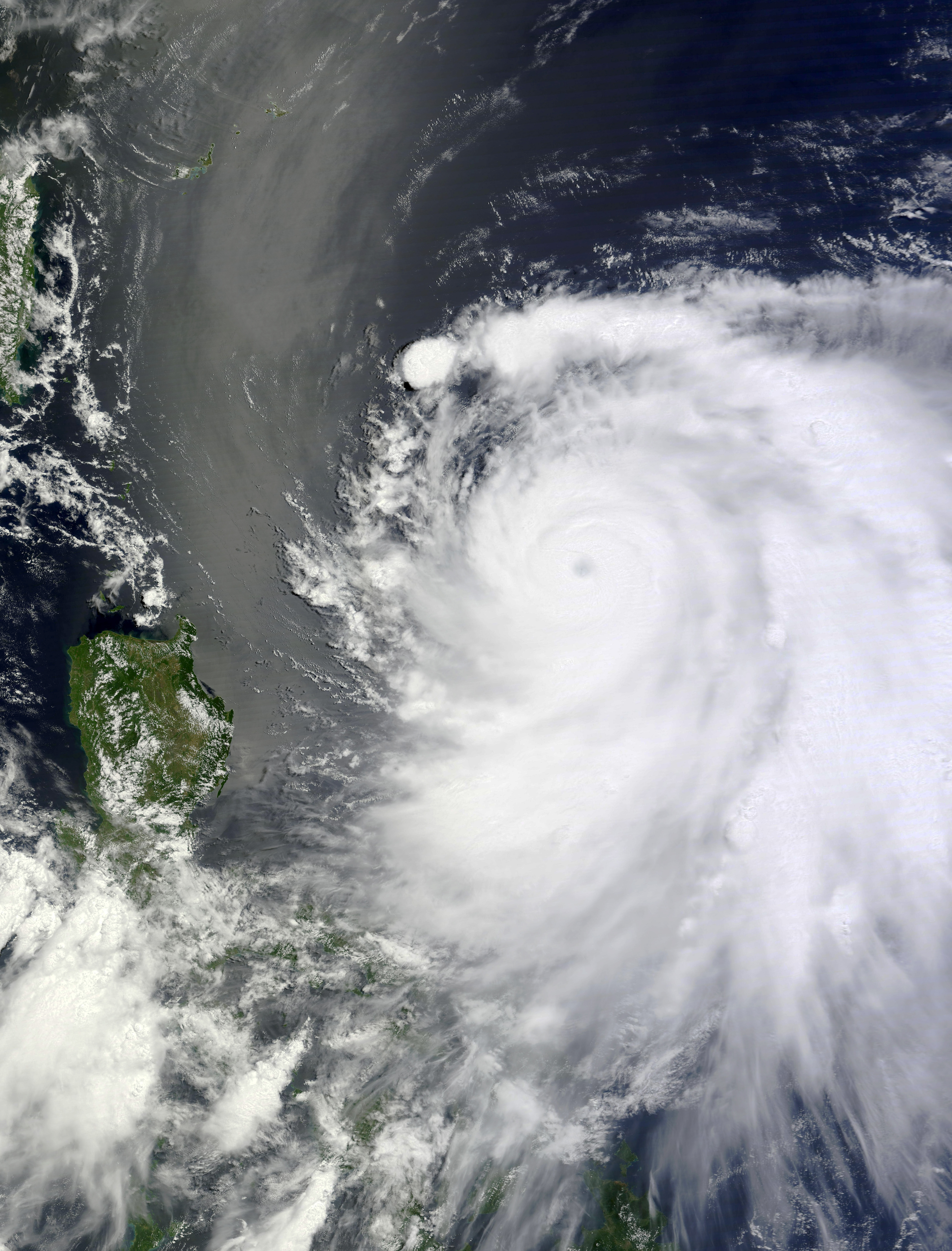
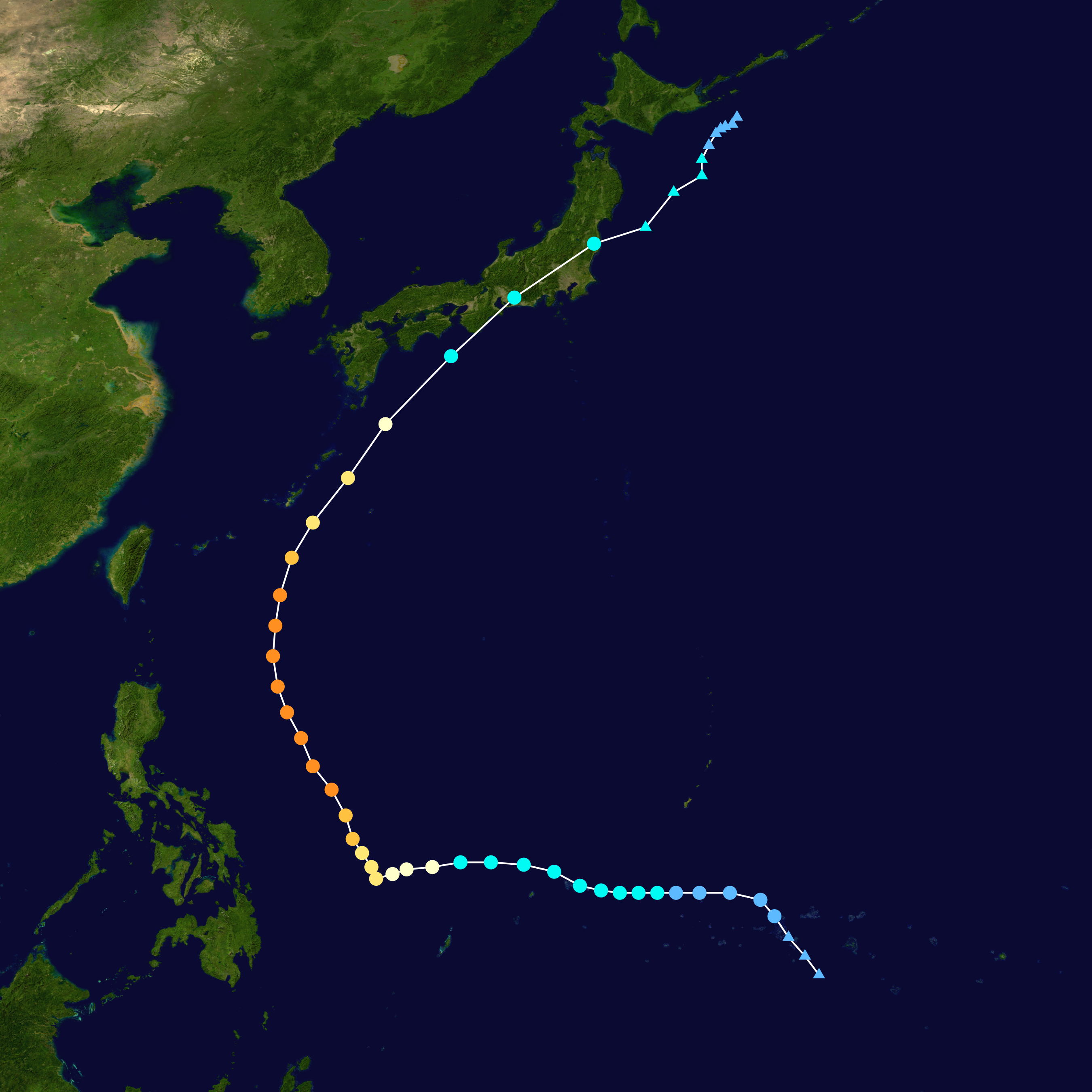
- Duration: June 10 – June 19
- Peak intensity: 185 km/h (115 mph) (10-min); 930 hPa (mbar)

Late on June 7, a tropical disturbance formed south-southeast of Pohnpei. By the next day, the Joint Typhoon Warning Center (JTWC) issued a Tropical Cyclone Formation Alert on the system, but cancelled it late on June 9. The JMA upgraded the low-pressure area to a tropical depression early on June 11, with the JTWC subsequently following suit. Early on the next day, the JTWC upgraded the system to a tropical storm, and later the JMA also upgraded it to a tropical storm and named it Guchol. Early on June 14, the JMA upgraded Guchol to a severe tropical storm, and the PAGASA assigned the local name Butchoy on the system as it entered the Philippine Area of Responsibility. Later that day, the JTWC upgraded Guchol to a category 1 typhoon, as convection started to organize. It continued to intensify into a category 2 typhoon on June 15, as it became better organized and started to develop more convection. As Guchol went through rapid intensification with a well defined eye on June 16, the JMA upgraded it to a typhoon early that day, and the JTWC upgraded it further to a category 3 typhoon, and later a category 4 super typhoon. Guchol reached peak intensity late on June 17, before it began to undergo an eyewall replacement cycle as the storm weakened under moderate vertical wind shear on June 18, and later started its extratropical transition. The JTWC downgraded Guchol to a tropical storm on June 19, as it made landfall over Kii Peninsula in Japan. Later that day, the JMA downgraded Guchol to a severe tropical storm, as it traversed Japan. On June 20, the JMA issued their last advisories on Guchol, as it fully transitioned into an extratropical cyclone northeast of Japan.

Between June 14 and 18, Guchol enhanced the southwestern monsoon over the Philippines, resulting in widespread rains. However, the effects of these rains were limited and only one fatality took place. In Japan, airlines cancelled 420 domestic and international flights because of the strong winds, affecting 32,600 passengers. The town of Nachikatsuura, some 400 kilometres southwest of Tokyo, ordered nearly 1,600 residents to evacuate, warning of the danger of landslides brought on by heavy rain, media reports said. At least two people were killed and eighty others were injured across the country. Total economic losses were estimated in excess of ¥8 billion (US$100 million).

=== Severe Tropical Storm Talim (Carina) ===
- Severe tropical storm (JMA)
- Tropical storm (SSHWS)
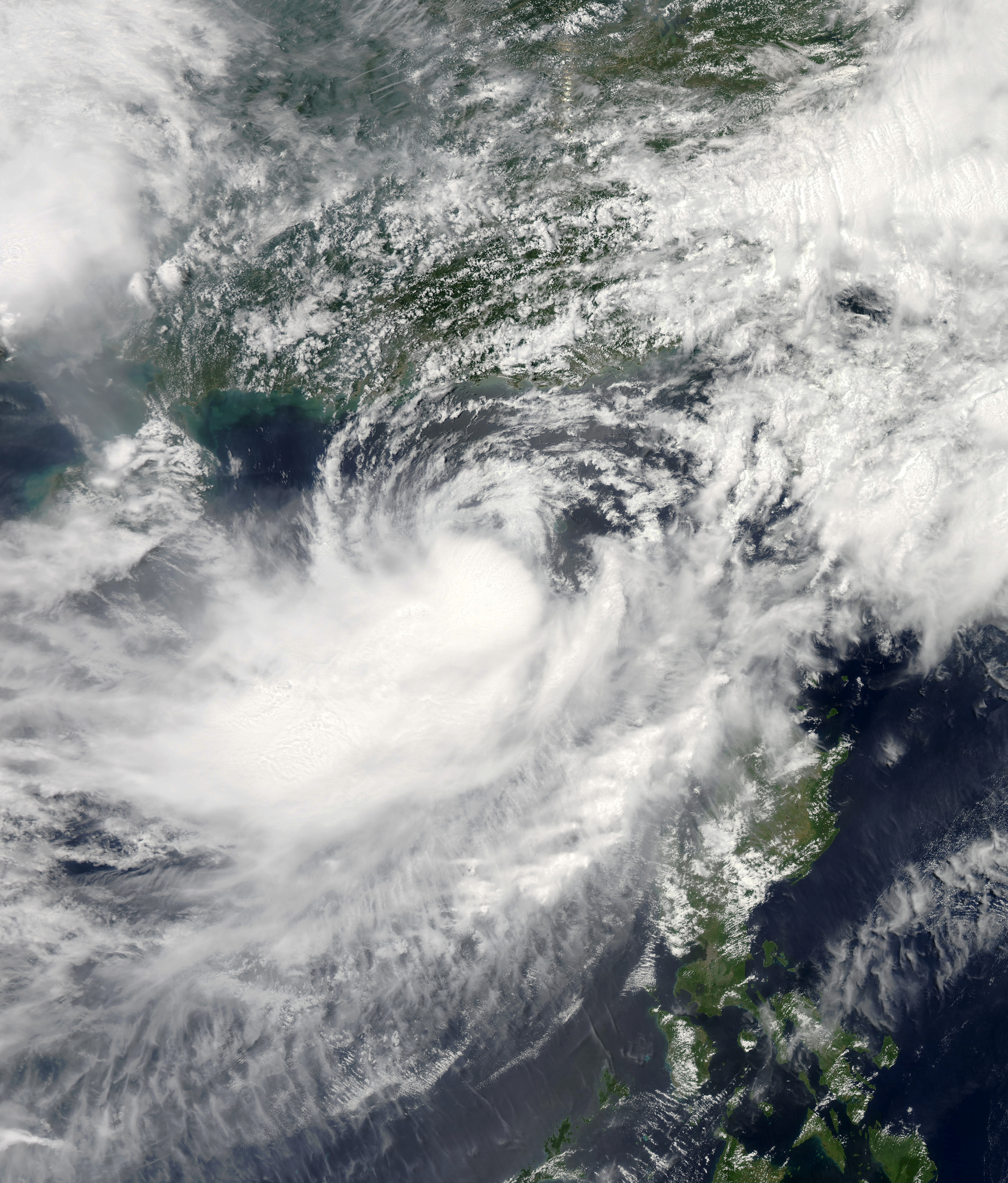
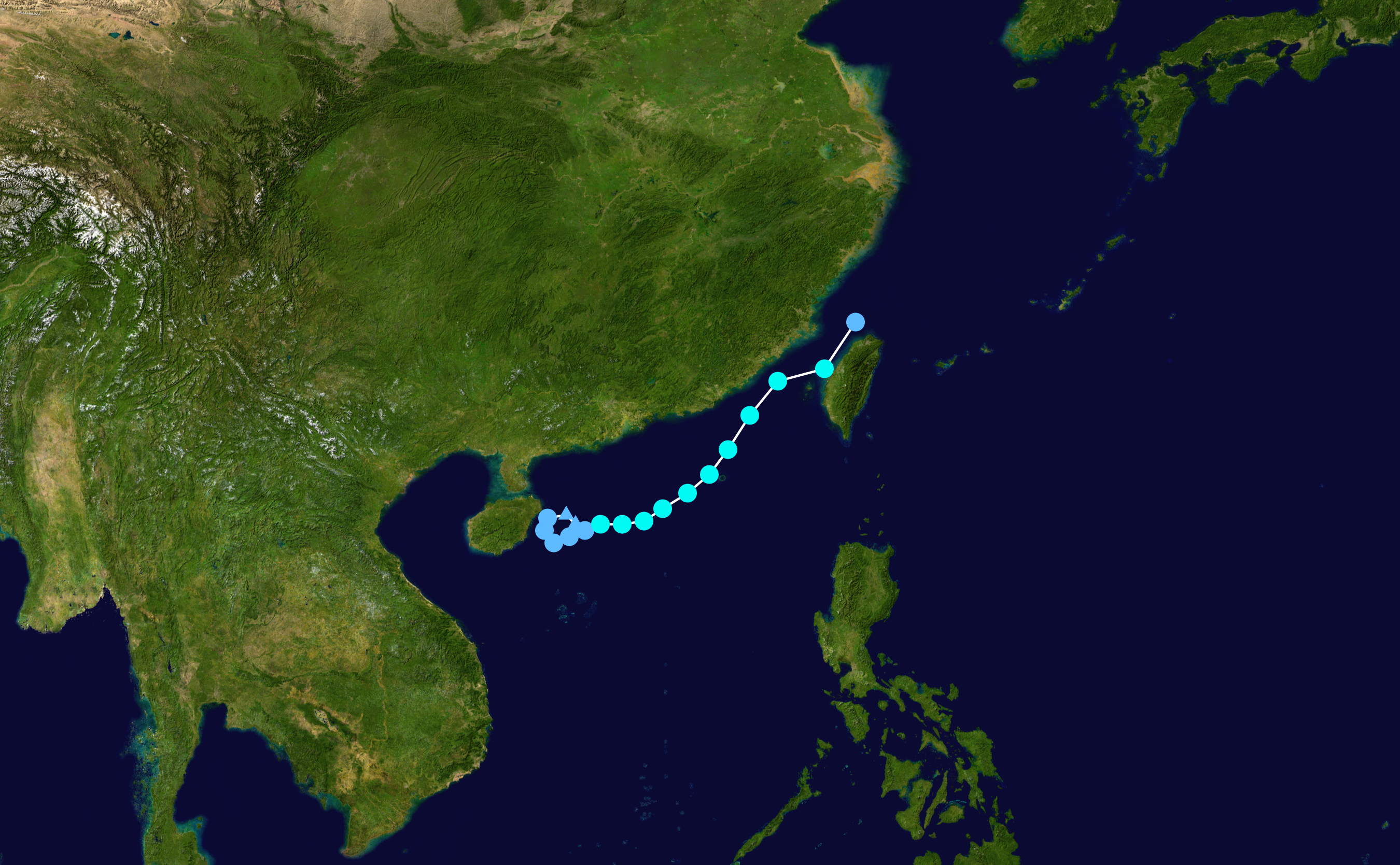
- Duration: June 16 – June 20
- Peak intensity: 95 km/h (60 mph) (10-min); 985 hPa (mbar)

On June 16, the JMA started to issue advisories on a tropical depression, located to the east of Hainan, China. By the next day, the JTWC issued a TCFA on the system, as deep convection was consolidating to its low-level circulation center. The JMA later upgraded the system to a tropical storm, naming it Talim. The JTWC subsequently started to issue advisories on Talim, as convection was quickly developing northward into the center. On June 18, the JTWC upgraded Talim to a tropical storm, as a scatterometer pass supported gale-force winds on the southern periphery of the system. However, as it moved east-northeastward, moderate to strong wind shear caused its deep convection to be displaced to the south, leaving its center partially exposed. By the next day, the system's center became fully exposed due to the continued effects of high wind shear. Despite that, Talim strengthened into a severe tropical storm. On June 20, the JMA downgraded Talim to a tropical storm, as the system tracked towards the Taiwan Strait. The PAGASA later assigned the local name Carina on the system, as it entered the Philippine Area of Responsibility. Late on June 20, both the JMA and the JTWC downgraded Talim to a tropical depression, as land interaction significantly weakened the system's organization. The JTWC issued their final advisory on the system by the next day.

In Hong Kong, the Strong Wind Signal No.3 was raised as Talim moved near the territory. Many fallen trees were reported, along with a yacht that ran aground due to its anchor being broken. Throughout China, 1 person was killed and total economic losses were counted to be CNY2.25 billion (US$354 million).

=== Tropical Storm Doksuri (Dindo) ===
- Tropical storm (JMA)
- Tropical storm (SSHWS)
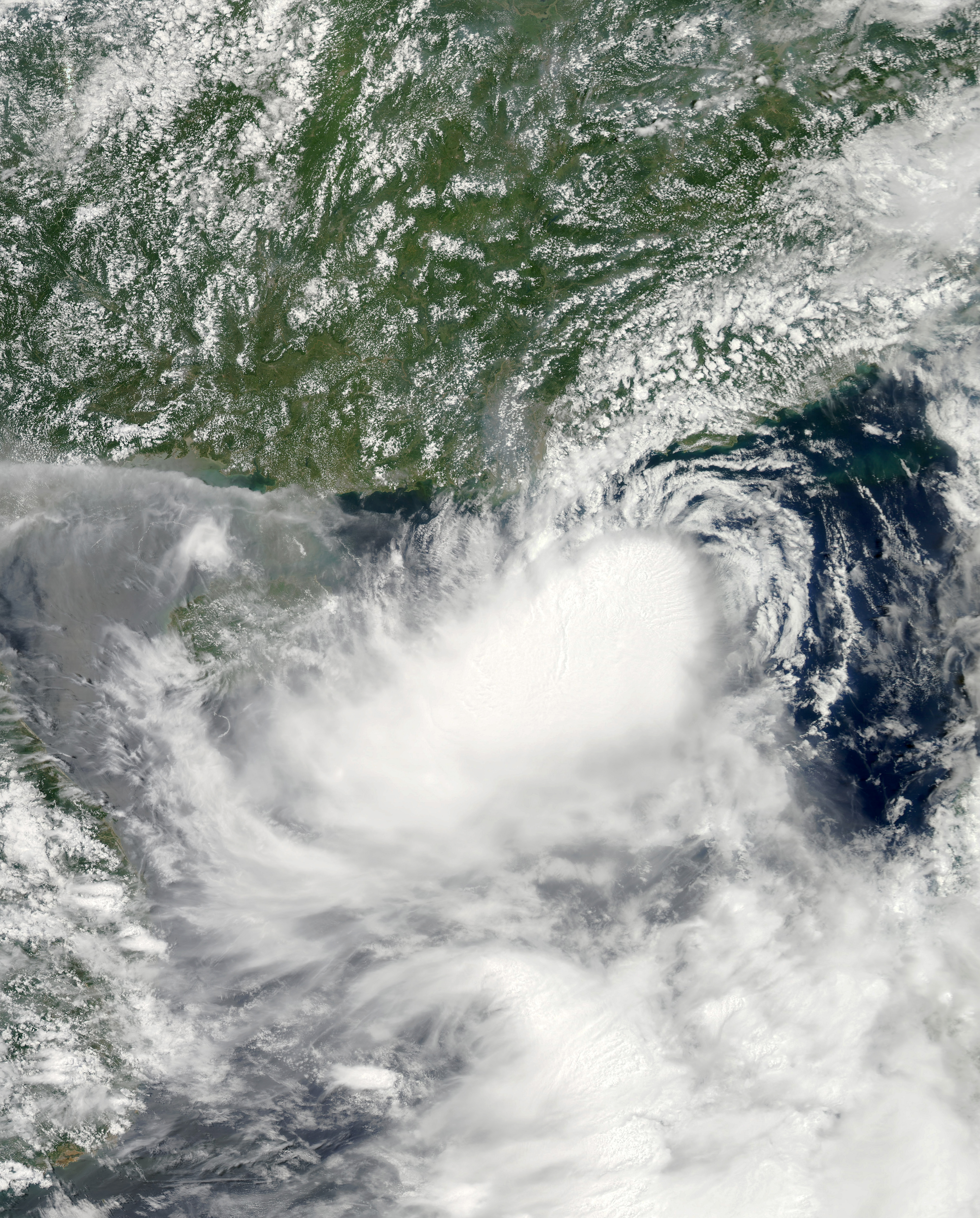
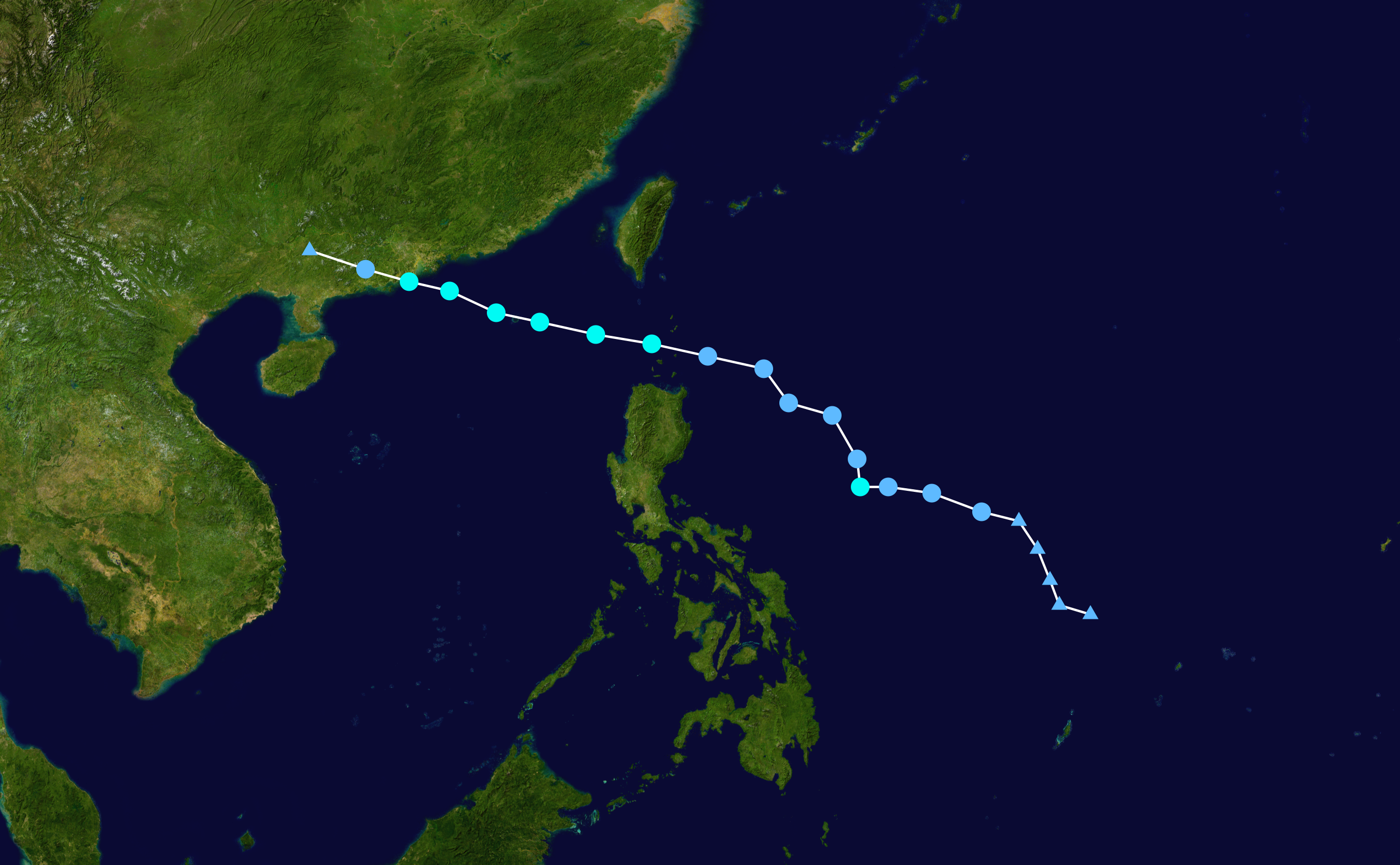
- Duration: June 25 – June 30
- Peak intensity: 75 km/h (45 mph) (10-min); 992 hPa (mbar)

On June 25, the JMA started to monitor a tropical depression that had developed, within the monsoon trough about 1,585 km (985 mi) to the southeast of Manila, Philippines. During that day the depression moved north-westwards and consolidated further before during the next day, PAGASA started to monitor it as Tropical Depression Dindo. Later that day, the JMA upgraded the system to a tropical storm and named it Doksuri, and the JTWC upgraded Doksuri to Tropical Depression 07W. Late on the same day, the JTWC upgraded Doksuri to a tropical storm. On June 27, Doksuri's low-level circulation center became exposed due to moderate easterly wind shear. On June 28, the JTWC downgraded Doksuri to a tropical depression, as the system's exposed circulation center began to undergo an unusual circulation center replacement cycle, which involves a circulation center to be replaced by another new circulation center. Late on June 29, Doksuri made landfall over Nanshui, Zhuhai, Guangdong, China. During June 30, the JMA reported that Doksuri had weakened into a tropical depression, before reporting that the depression had dissipated later that day. In Macau, the storm caused minor roof damage.

=== Severe Tropical Storm Khanun (Enteng) ===
- Severe tropical storm (JMA)
- Tropical storm (SSHWS)
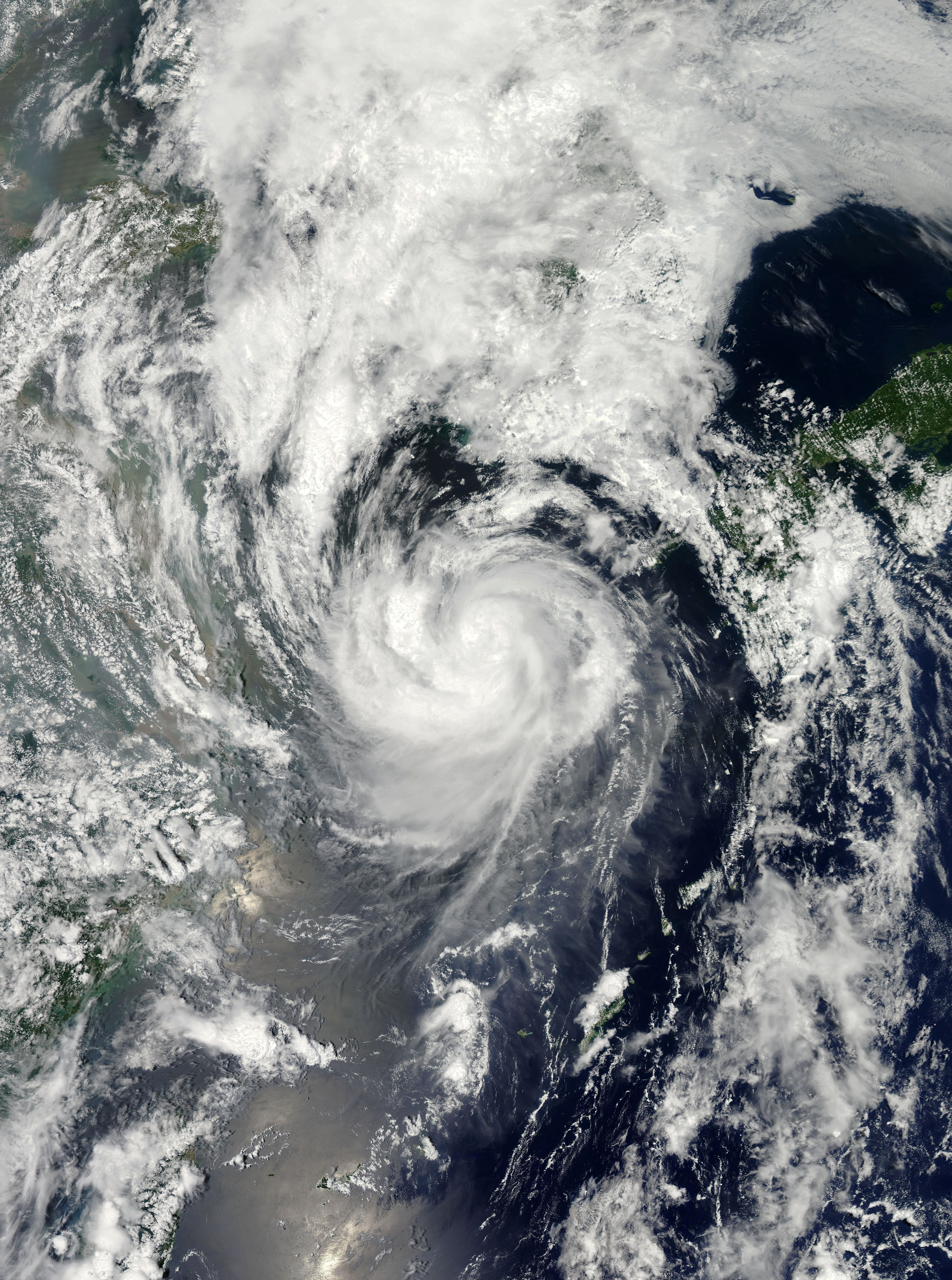
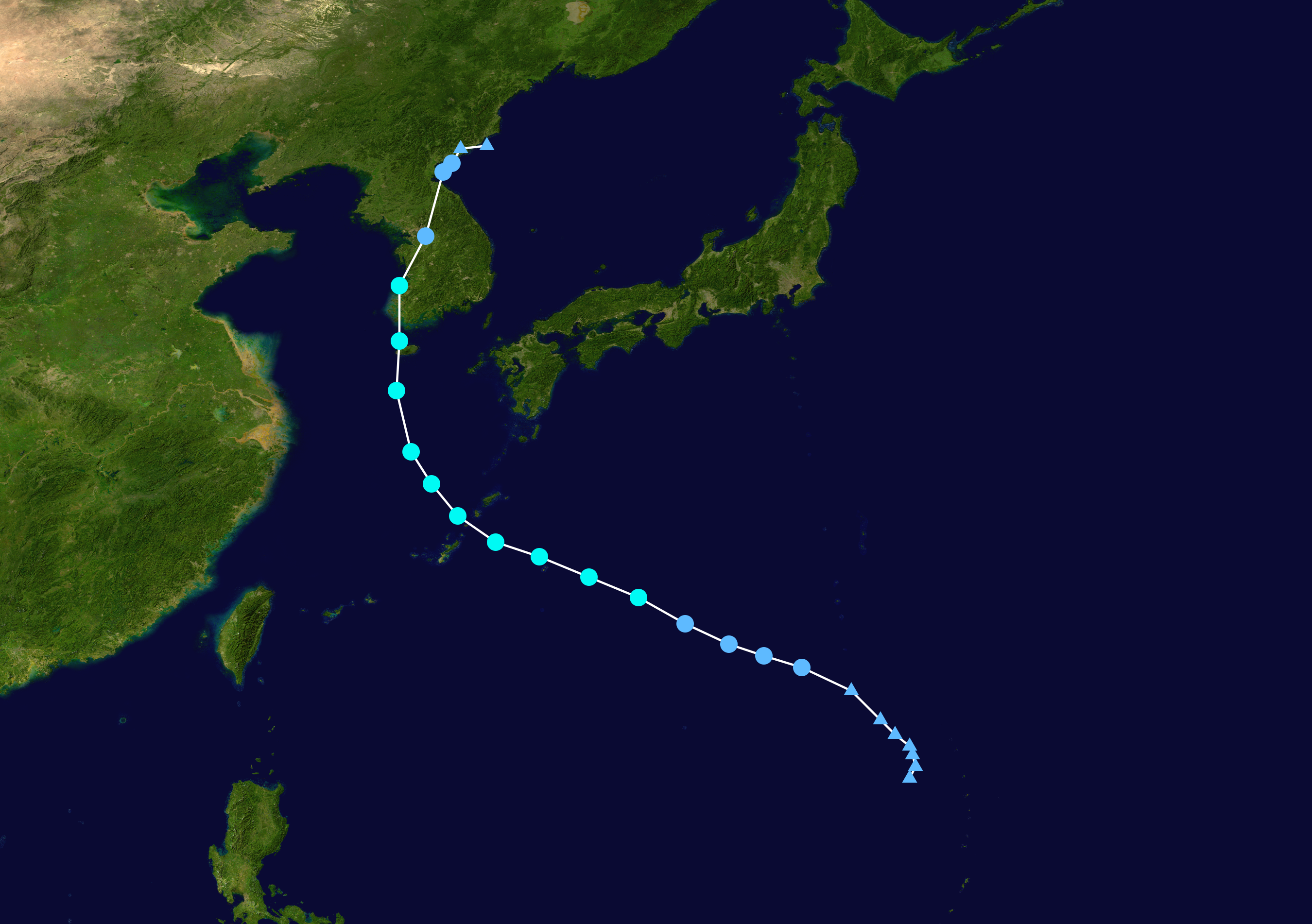
- Duration: July 14 – July 19
- Peak intensity: 95 km/h (60 mph) (10-min); 985 hPa (mbar)

On July 14, the JTWC reported that a tropical disturbance had formed to the north-northeast of Guam. As the low's convection started to organize, the JMA to upgraded the system to a tropical depression late on the same day. Early on the next day, the JTWC issued a TCFA on the system, and it upgraded the system to a tropical depression later that day. On July 16, the JMA upgraded the system to a tropical storm and named it Khanun. Later on the same day, the JTWC upgraded Khanun to a tropical storm; also, the PAGASA named it Enteng as the system briefly passed the corner of the Philippine Area of Responsibility. Late on July 17, the JMA upgraded Khanun to a severe tropical storm. On July 18, the JMA downgraded Khanun to a tropical storm, before the system passed over Jeju. Khanun weakened into a tropical depression near the Korean Demilitarized Zone early on July 19, and it became post-tropical late on the same day.

The storm killed at least one person in South Korea, while in North Korea, state-run media reported that at least seven people were killed in Kangwon Province, with an eighth fatality reported elsewhere. It said the storm caused significant damage, destroying 650 dwelling houses, 30 public buildings, railways, roads, bridges, and various systems. The flooding also inundated nearly 3,870 homes, leaving more than 16,250 people homeless. On July 29, the North Korean government dramatically raised the death toll in the country to 88, with an additional 134 injured. The biggest loss of human life was in two counties of South Pyongan Province. At least 63,000 were made homeless by the flooding, while more than 30,000 hectares of land for growing crops were submerged and will add to growing fears of another looming famine in the country. Three hundred public buildings and 60 factories were damaged during the storm.

=== Typhoon Vicente (Ferdie) ===
- Typhoon (JMA)
- Category 4 typhoon (SSHWS)
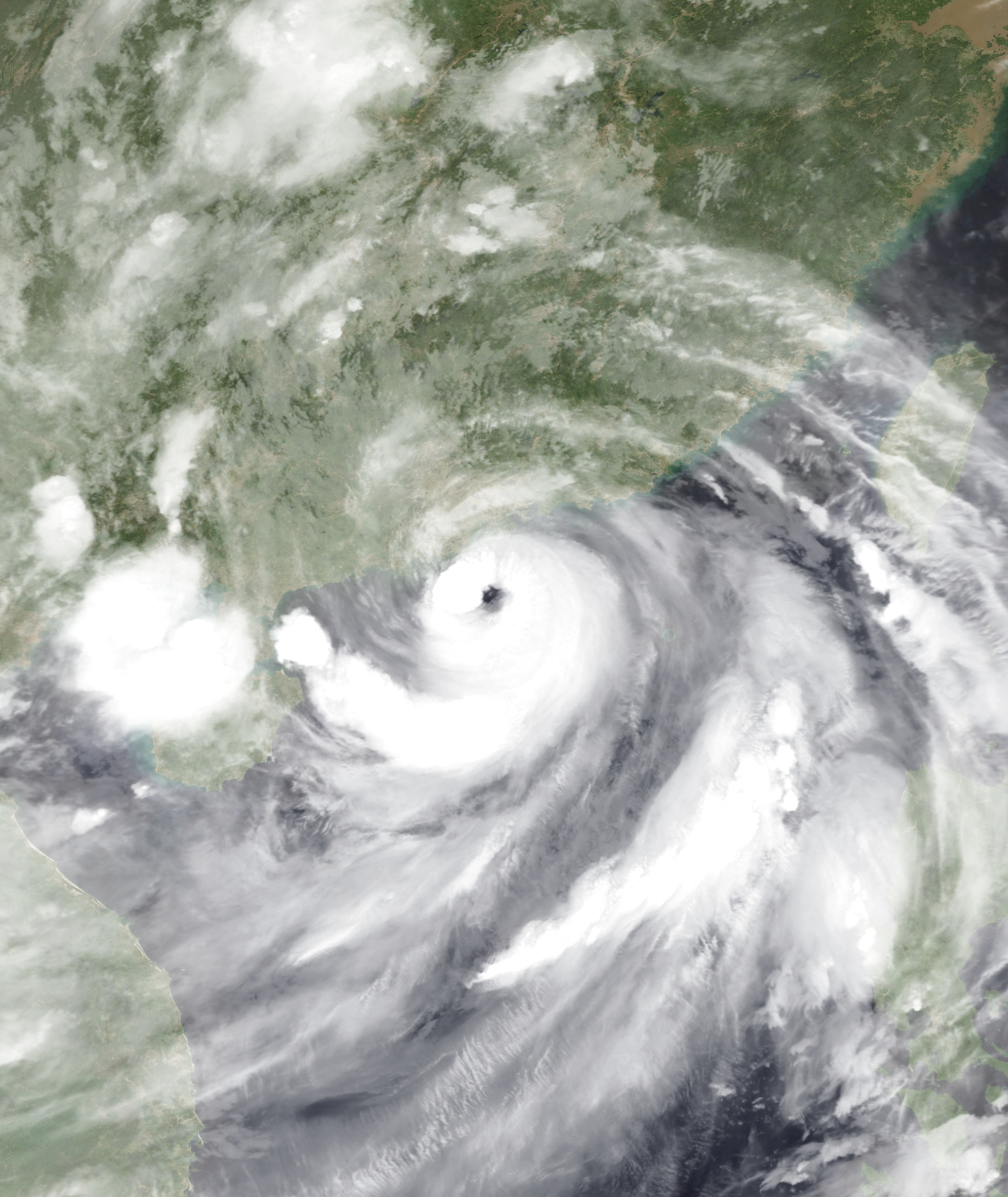
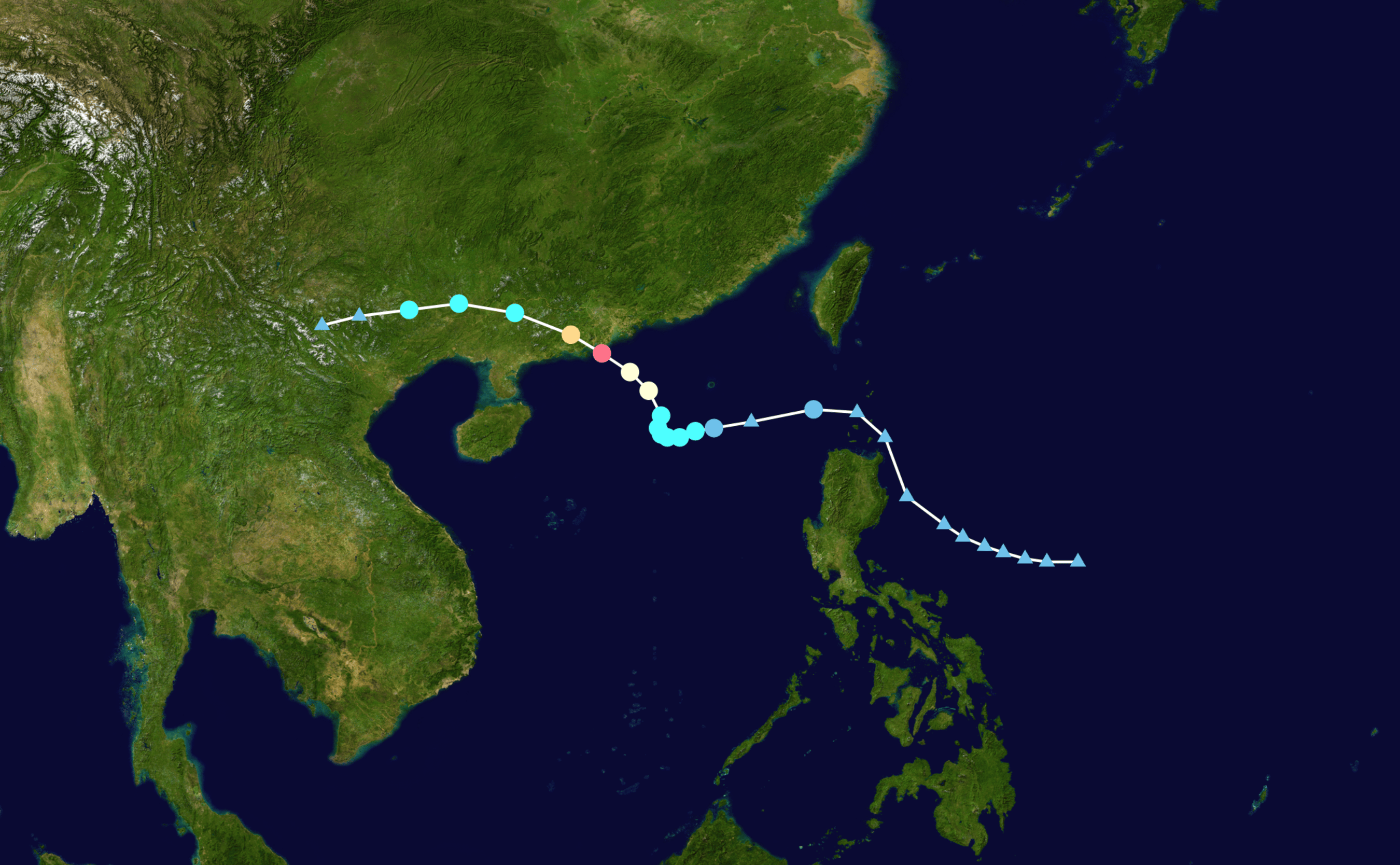
- Duration: July 18 – July 25
- Peak intensity: 150 km/h (90 mph) (10-min); 950 hPa (mbar)

Originally Khanun's large area of convention on July 16, the JMA upgraded the system to a tropical depression on July 18. On July 20, the JTWC issued a TCFA on the system; soon, the PAGASA upgraded it to a tropical depression and named it Ferdie. The JTWC also upgraded the system to a tropical depression late on the same day. After the system moved into the South China Sea on July 21, the JMA upgraded the system to a tropical storm and named it Vicente, so did the JTWC.

On July 23, due to weak vertical wind shear and high sea surface temperature, Vicente started to undergo an explosive intensification prompting the JMA to upgrade Vicente to a typhoon, and the JTWC upgraded Vicente to a category 4 typhoon later. At 16:45 UTC, the HKO issued the Hurricane Signal, No. 10, the first since Tropical Storm York in 1999. Later, Typhoon Vicente made landfall over Taishan in Guangdong, China. Due to land interaction, the JMA downgraded Vicente to a severe tropical storm early on July 24, and the JTWC downgraded Vicente to a category 3 typhoon. Late on the same day, the JMA downgraded Vicente to a tropical depression.

=== Typhoon Saola (Gener) ===
- Typhoon (JMA)
- Category 2 typhoon (SSHWS)
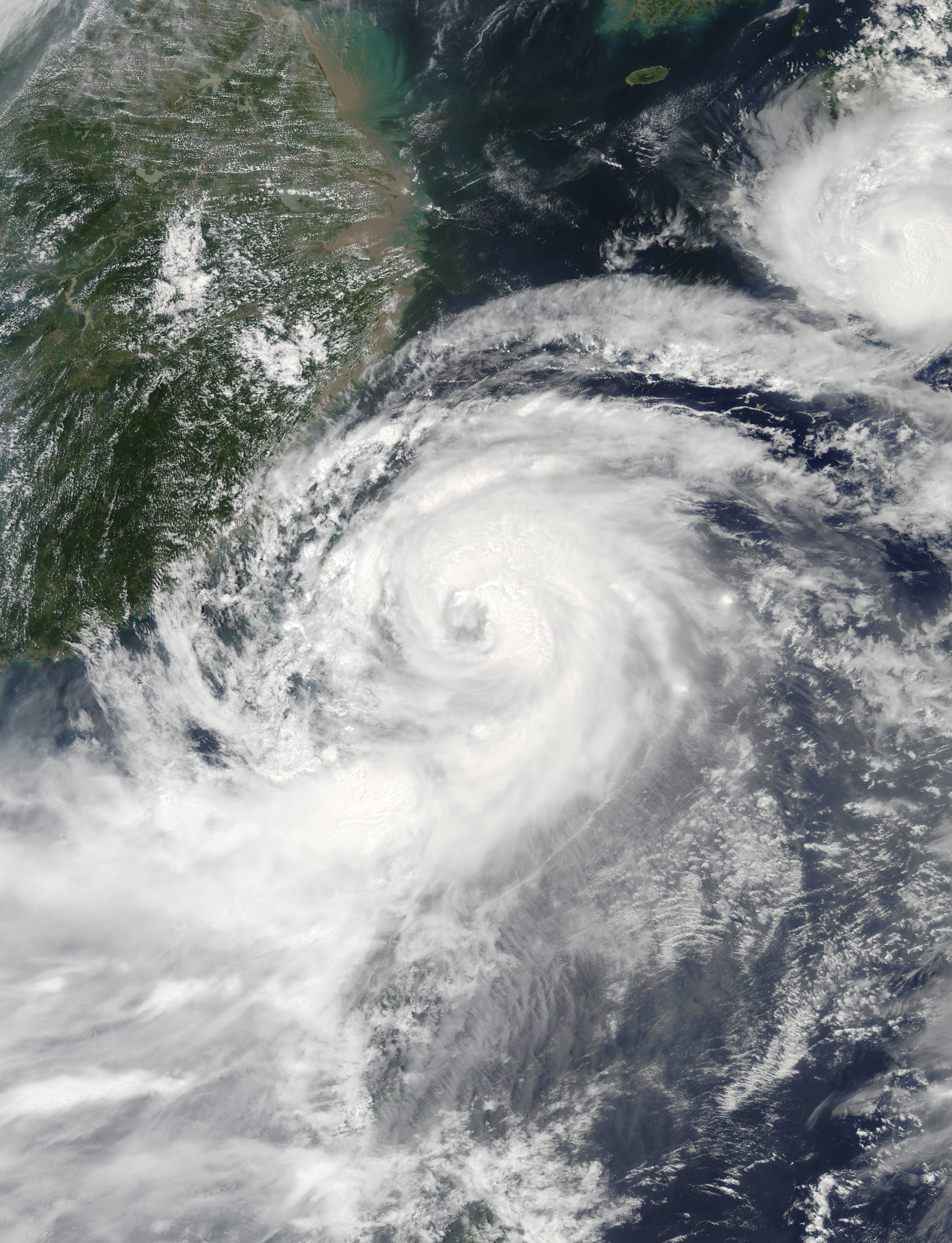
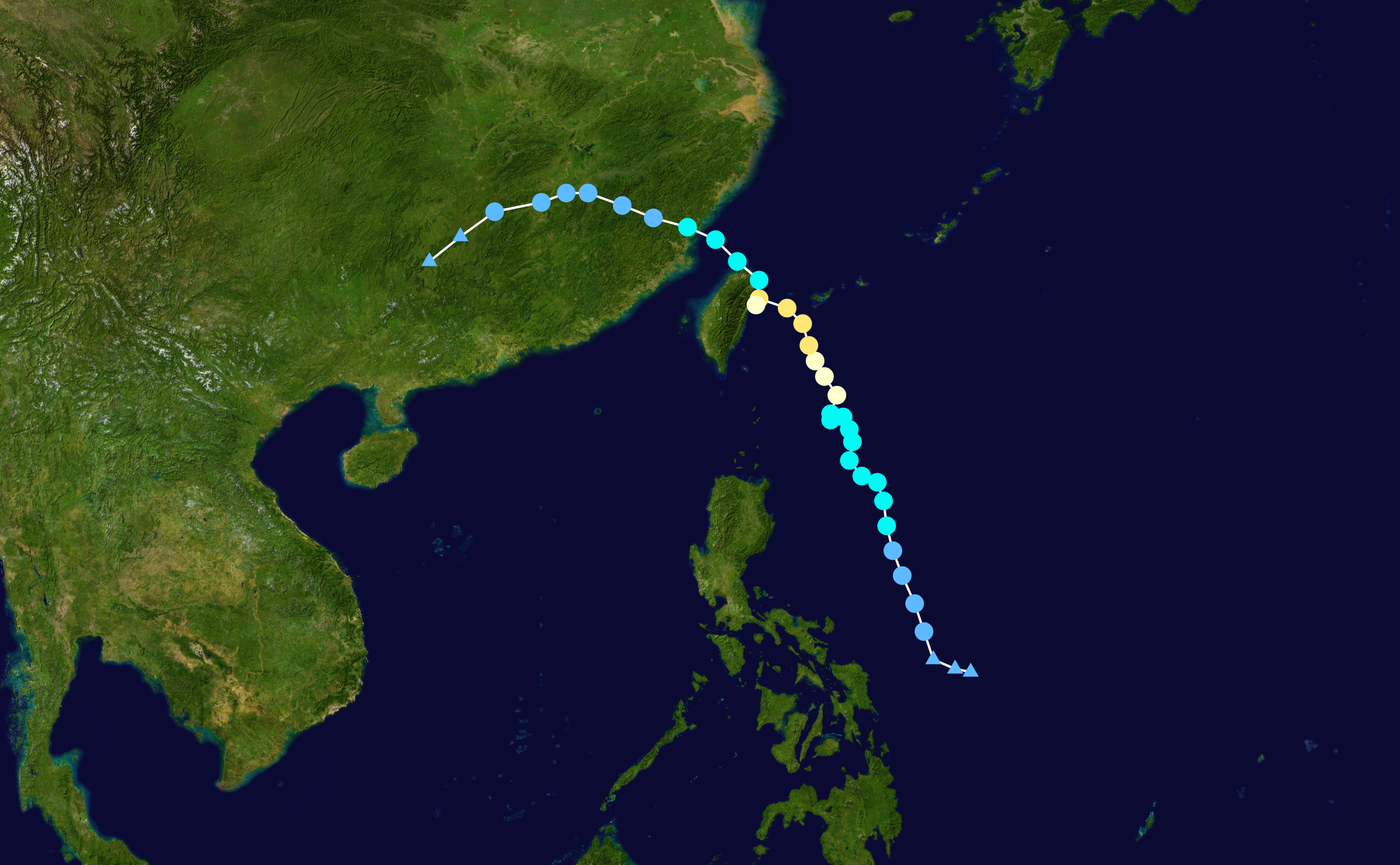
- Duration: July 26 – August 5
- Peak intensity: 130 km/h (80 mph) (10-min); 960 hPa (mbar)

On July 26, the JMA reported that a tropical depression had developed within an area of strong vertical windshear in the monsoon trough about 1,000 kilometres (620 mi) to the southeast of Manila in the Philippines. Early on July 28, the JTWC upgraded the system to a tropical depression, whilst the JMA upgraded it to a tropical storm and named it Saola. Soon, the PAGASA upgraded the system to a tropical depression and named it Gener. Later that day, the JTWC upgraded Saola to a tropical storm. Early on July 29, the JMA upgraded Saola to a severe tropical storm. On July 30, the JTWC upgraded Saola to a category 1 typhoon, as it started to develop an eye-like feature, but soon downgraded it to a tropical storm late on the same day. By the next day, the JTWC reupgraded Saola to a Category 1 typhoon. Late on the same day, the JMA upgraded Saola to a typhoon. It continued to intensify the next day, reaching its peak intensity as a Category 2 typhoon.

Most forecast models predicted Saola to pass near the northern coastline of Taiwan, but this is defied on August 1, when Saola had made landfall on Taiwan as a Category 2 typhoon. It moved slowly inland, making a counter-clockwise loop. As it emerged to the ocean, it weakened to a severe tropical storm on August 2. Saola then returned to its northwest track and traversed Taiwan, as it weakened to a tropical storm, before emerging to the Taiwan Strait and approached China. On August 3, it made its final landfall in China as a tropical storm, with the JTWC issuing their final advisory. The JMA later followed suit, as Saola weakened to a tropical depression over Jiangxi.

=== Typhoon Damrey ===
- Typhoon (JMA)
- Category 1 typhoon (SSHWS)
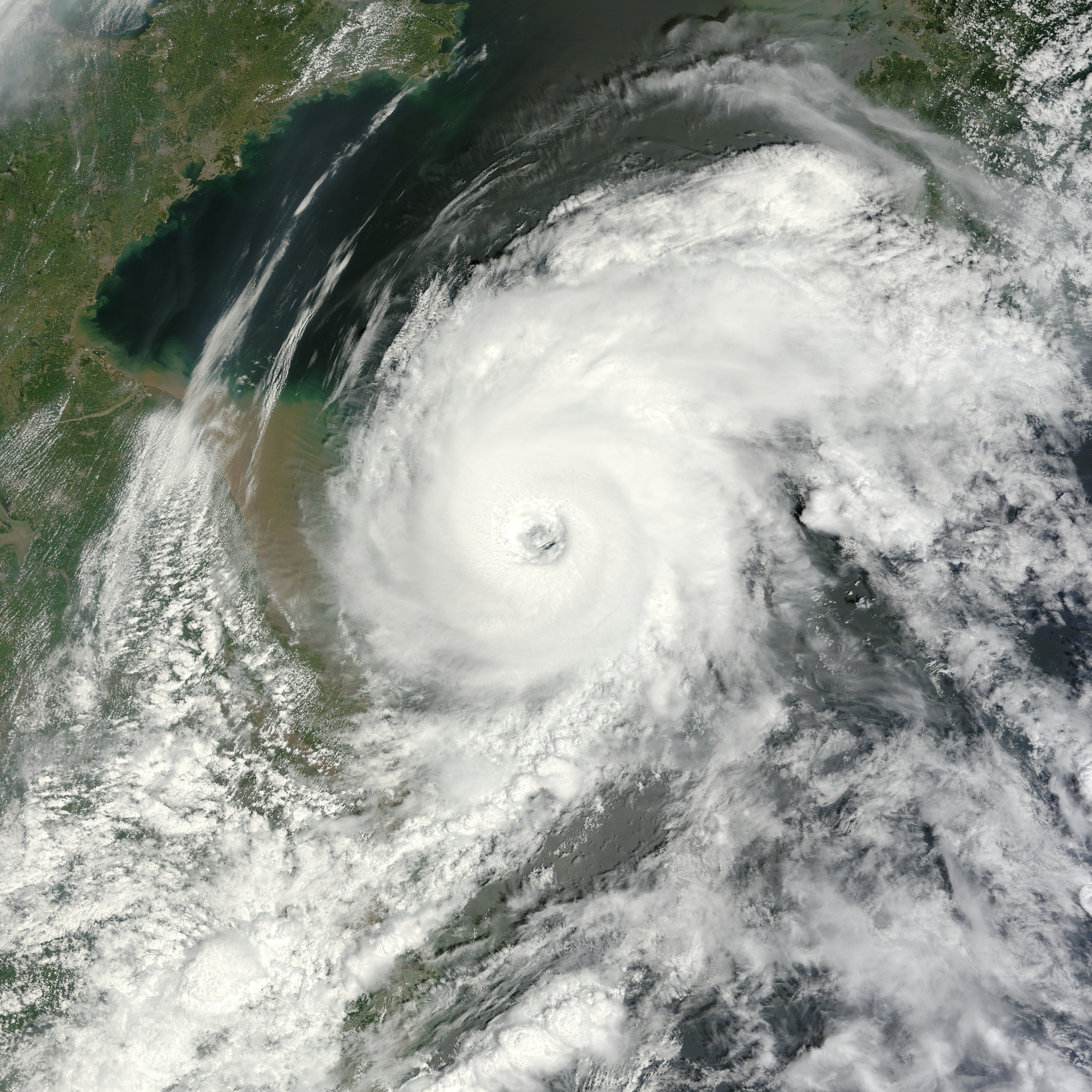
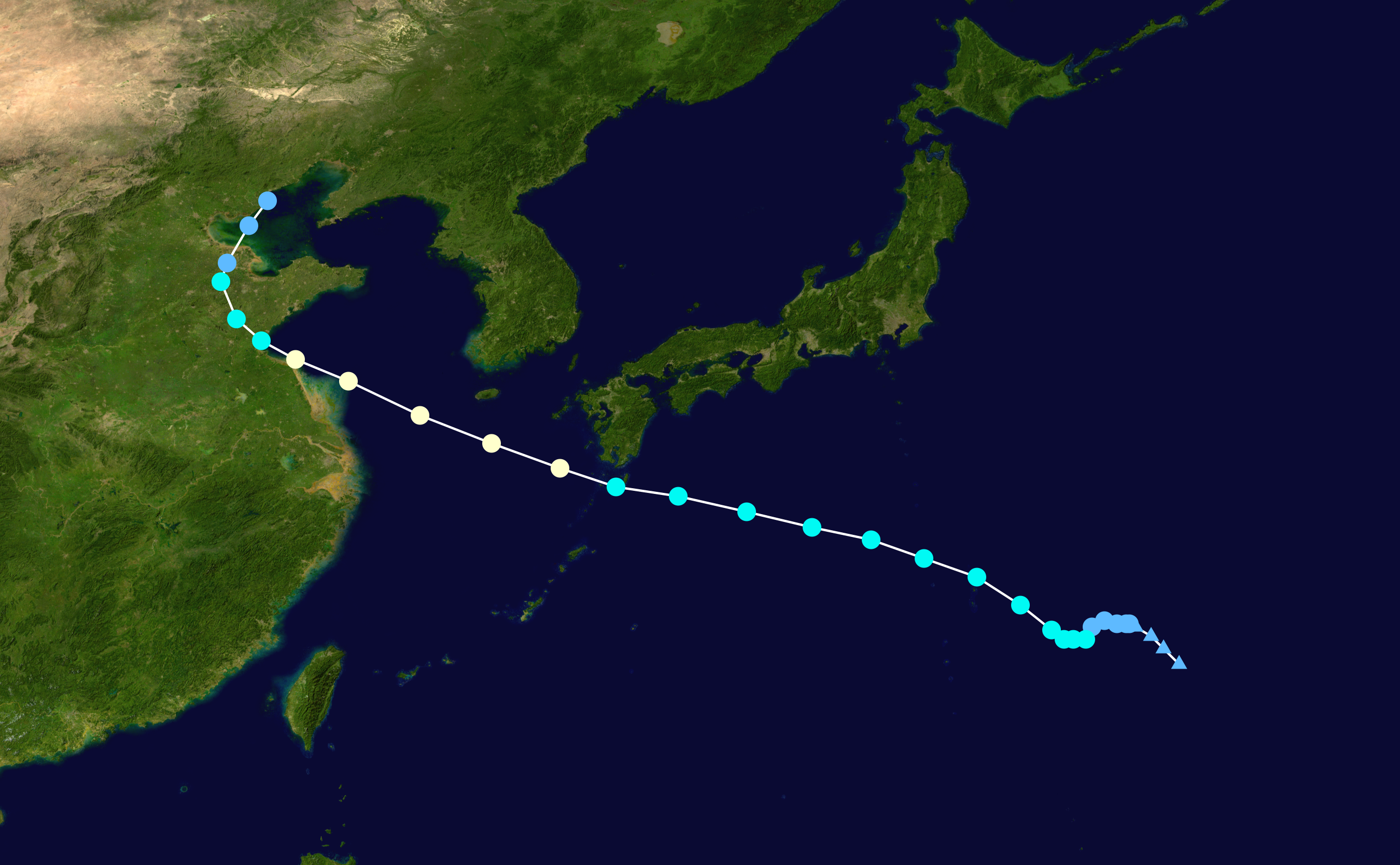
- Duration: July 27 – August 4
- Peak intensity: 130 km/h (80 mph) (10-min); 965 hPa (mbar)

Originally a cold-core low, the system became a tropical disturbance southwest of Minamitorishima late on July 26. Early on July 27, the Japan Meteorological Agency (JMA) upgraded it to a tropical depression. On July 28, the Joint Typhoon Warning Center (JTWC) issued a Tropical Cyclone Formation Alert on the system, before the JMA upgraded it to a tropical storm and named it Damrey. Late on the same day, the JTWC upgraded Damrey to a tropical depression, and even upgraded it to a tropical storm on the next day. After Damrey had drifted slowly for two days, the JMA upgraded it to a severe tropical storm northeast of Chichi-jima late on July 30, when the storm began to accelerate moving west-northwest and form a banding eye. On August 1, the JTWC upgraded Damrey to a category 1 typhoon, while the system passed through the Ōsumi Islands in Japan, as it started to develop a well defined eye. When Damrey drifted towards Yellow Sea on August 2, the JMA upgraded it to a typhoon. Soon, Typhoon Damrey made landfall over Xiangshui County in Jiangsu, China at 13:30 UTC (21:30 CST). Late on August 2, the JTWC downgraded Damrey to a tropical storm with a final warning, with the JMA downgrading it to a severe tropical storm. By August 3, the JMA downgraded Damrey to a tropical depression when it was located in Shandong. The system then dissipated near Hebei on August 4.

=== Typhoon Haikui ===
- Typhoon (JMA)
- Category 1 typhoon (SSHWS)
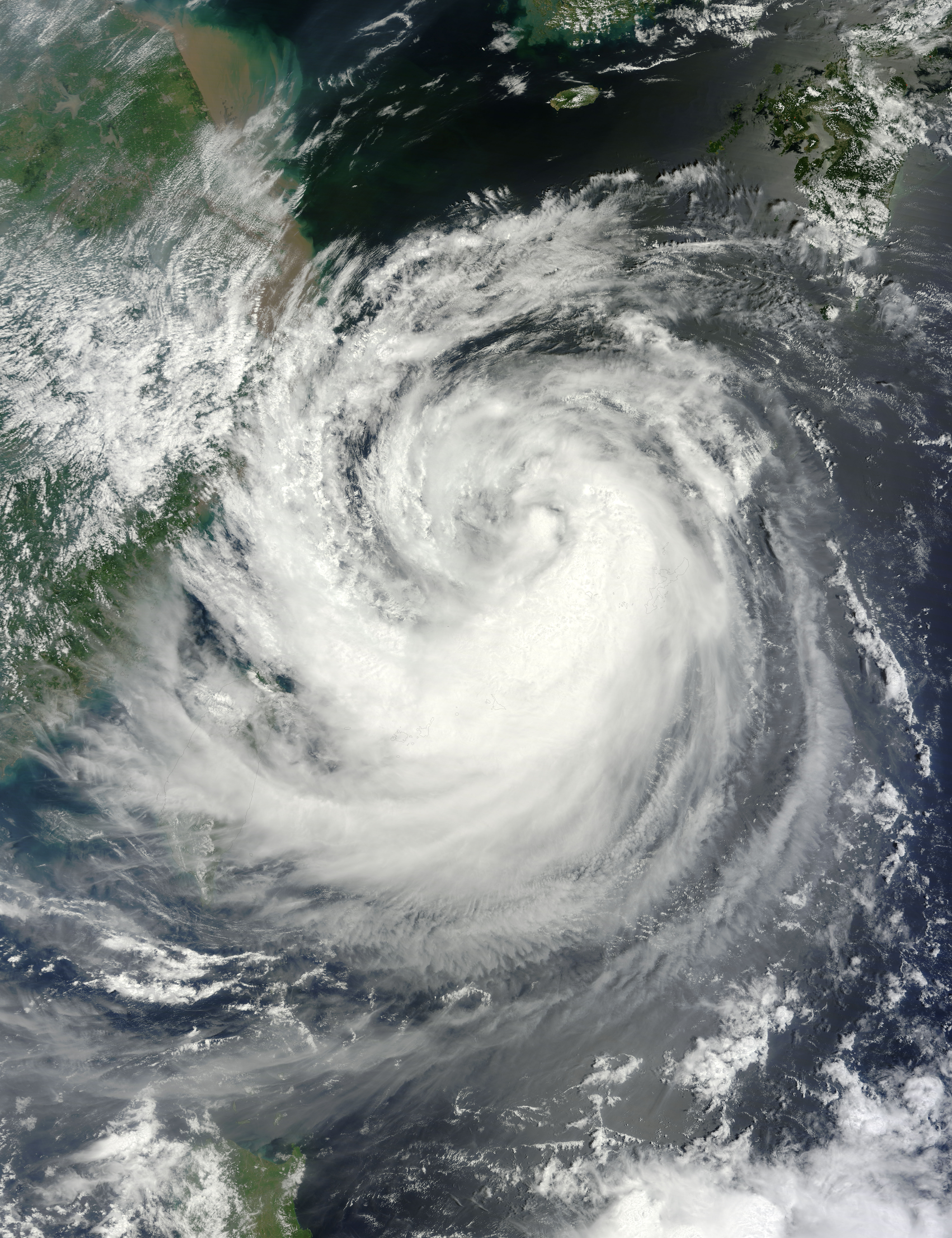
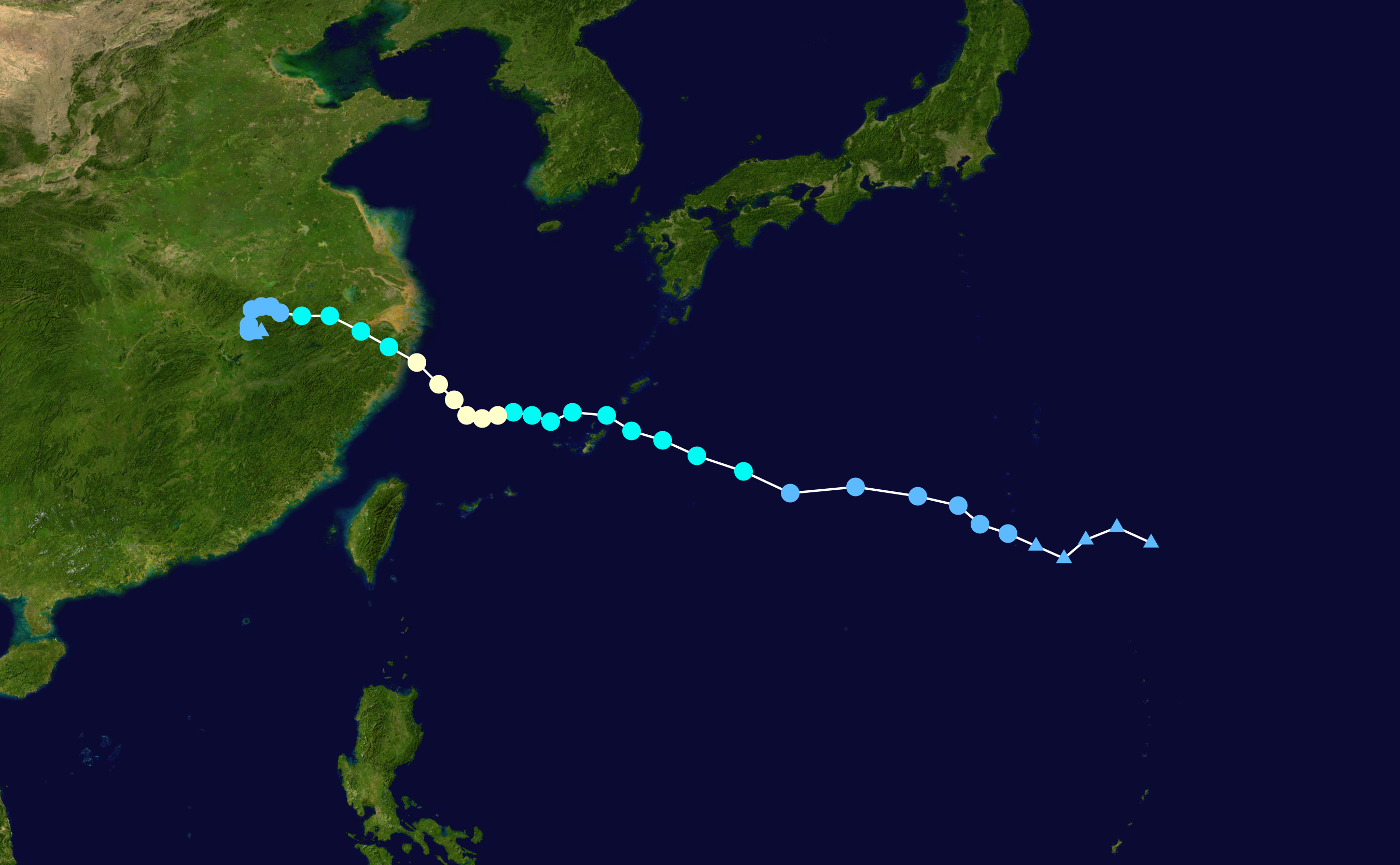
- Duration: August 1 – August 11
- Peak intensity: 120 km/h (75 mph) (10-min); 965 hPa (mbar)

Late on July 31, a tropical disturbance formed within a large monsoon trough. On August 1, the Japan Meteorological Agency (JMA) mentioned the system as a tropical depression southeast of Iwo Jima, and the Joint Typhoon Warning Center (JTWC) issued a Tropical Cyclone Formation Alert late on the same day. Late on August 2, the JTWC upgraded it to a tropical depression, before the JMA upgraded the system to a tropical storm and named it Haikui early on the next day. Early on August 4, the JTWC upgraded Haikui to a tropical storm. On August 5, the JMA upgraded Haikui to a severe tropical storm when it was located north-northeast of Kume Island. The JTWC upgraded Haikui to a category 1 typhoon late on August 6, as it developed an eye. At 12:00 UTC on August 7, the JMA upgraded Haikui to a typhoon. Later, Typhoon Haikui made landfall over Xiangshan County in Zhejiang, China at 19:20 UTC (03:20 CST on August 8). Early on August 8, the JMA downgraded Haikui to a severe tropical storm, when the JTWC issued the final warning. Soon, the JMA downgraded Haikui to a tropical storm. Haikui further weakened to a tropical depression on August 9, with the JMA issuing their last advisory on the system.

=== Severe Tropical Storm Kirogi ===
- Severe tropical storm (JMA)
- Tropical storm (SSHWS)
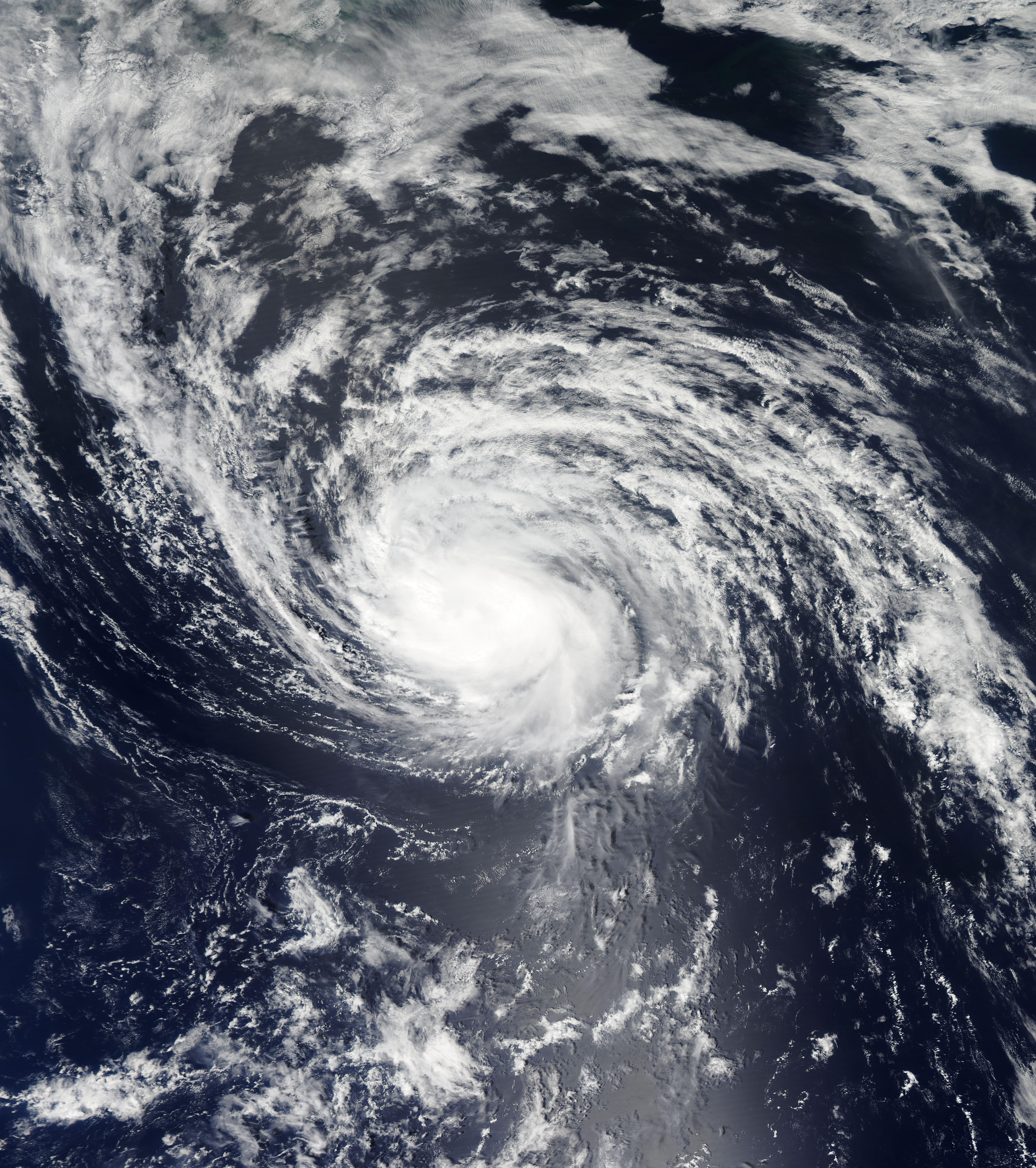
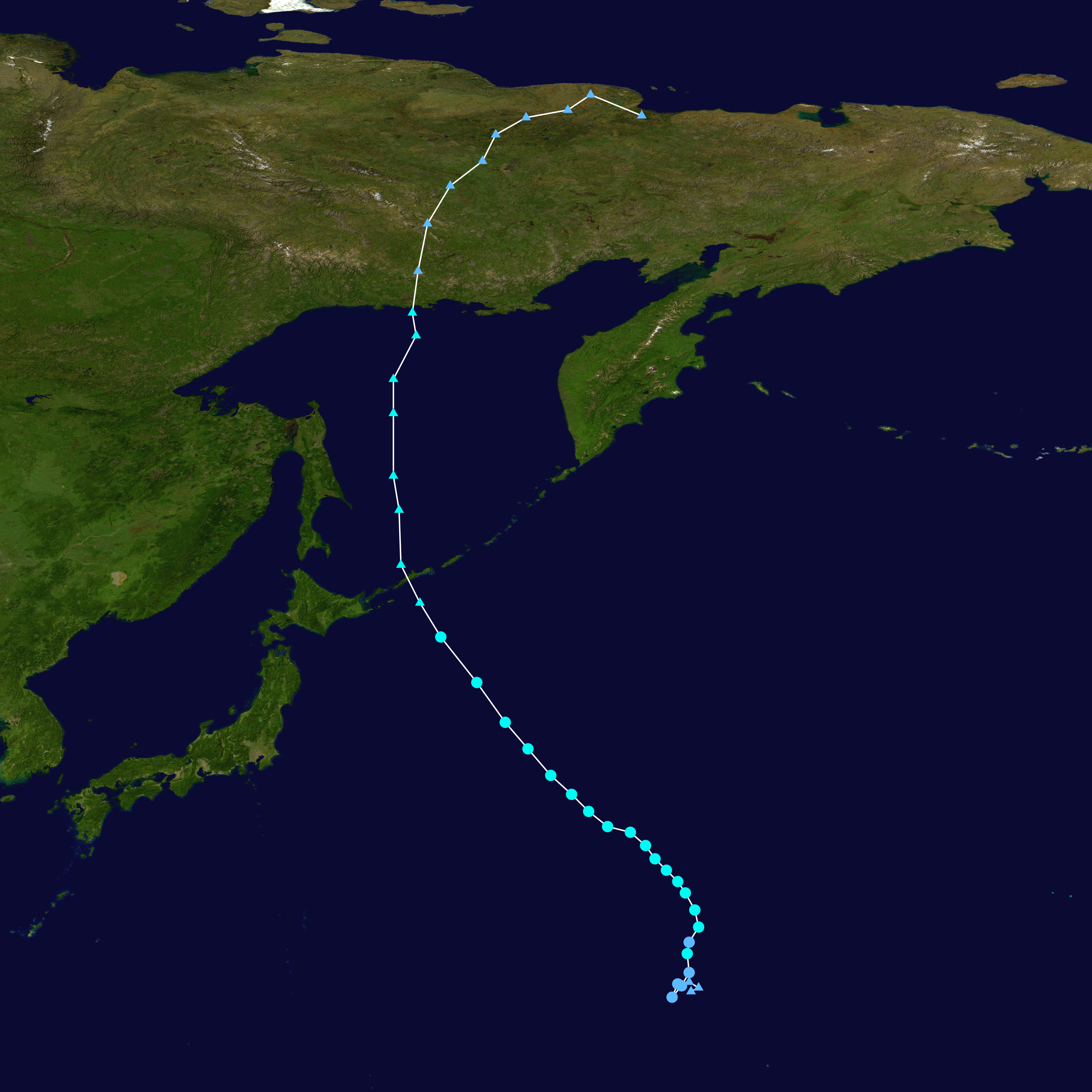
- Duration: August 3 – August 10
- Peak intensity: 95 km/h (60 mph) (10-min); 990 hPa (mbar)

During August 3, the JMA reported that a tropical depression had developed, about 720 km (445 mi) to the northwest of Wake Island. Over the next day the system gradually developed further, before the JTWC started to monitor the system as Tropical Depression 13W, late on August 4.

On August 5, the JTWC upgraded the system to a tropical storm. Early on August 6, the JMA reported that the system had become extratropical. However, the JMA designated it as a tropical storm with the name Kirogi early on August 8. Early on August 9, the JTWC downgraded Kirogi to a tropical depression. Later, the JMA upgraded Kirogi to a severe tropical storm, it reached its peak intensity, while the JTWC upgraded it to a tropical storm again. Later that day, the JTWC issued its final warning on Kirogi as it transitioned from a warm cored tropical system to a cold cored subtropical system. The remnants of the system then entered the Sea of Okhotsk.

=== Typhoon Kai-tak (Helen) ===
- Typhoon (JMA)
- Category 1 typhoon (SSHWS)
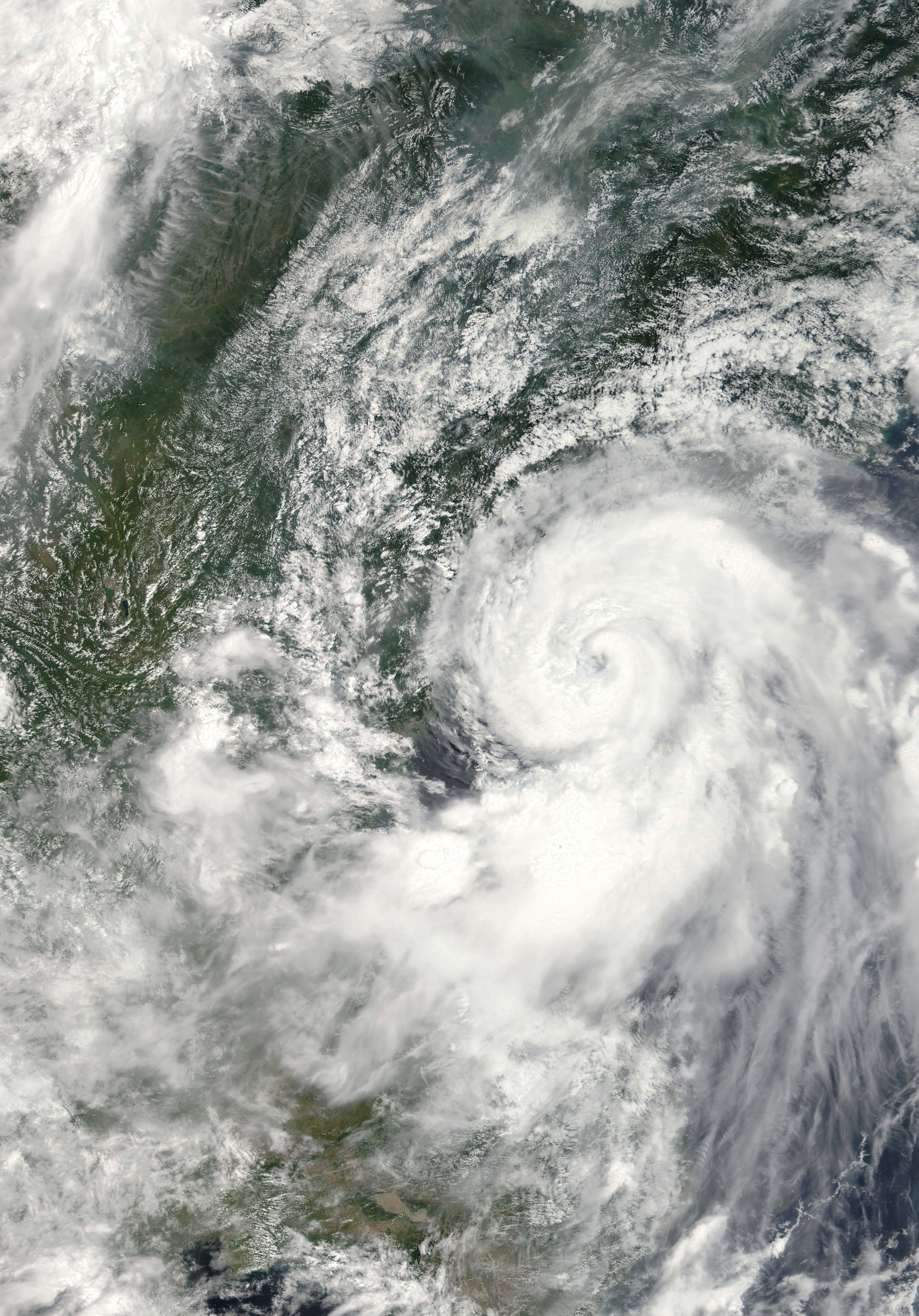
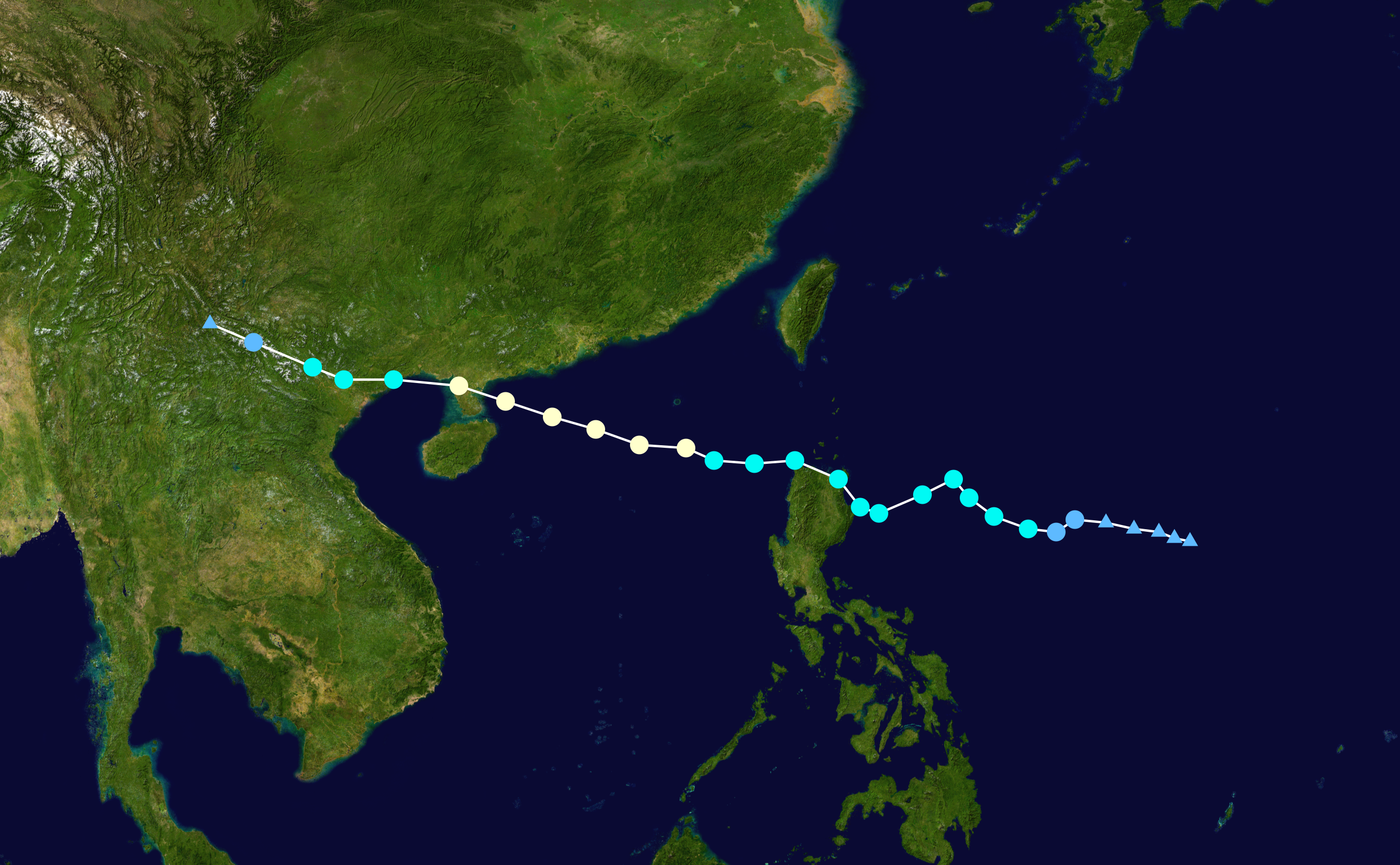
- Duration: August 12 – August 18
- Peak intensity: 120 km/h (75 mph) (10-min); 970 hPa (mbar)

The monsoonal trough spawned a tropical disturbance early on August 10, which had organizing convection and a weak circulation. Early on August 12, the Japan Meteorological Agency (JMA) started tracking the system as a weak Tropical Depression with winds under 30 knots. Philippine Atmospheric, Geophysical and Astronomical Services Administration (PAGASA) started issuing advisories on the system, naming it Helen. That day, the JTWC also initiated advisories on Tropical Depression 14W. Early on August 13, the JMA upgraded the depression to Tropical Storm Kai-tak (1213). and 9 hours later the JTWC followed suit. Later the same day, the JMA upgraded it to a Severe Tropical Storm. On August 15, the convection increased as outflow improved, and the JTWC upgraded Kai-tak to a typhoon. The storm continued towards China, with deepening convection due to decreasing wind shear. However, it was only at 0000 UTC on August 16 when the JMA officially declared Kai-tak a typhoon. At the same time, the PAGASA issued their last warning on Kai-tak, otherwise known as Helen, locally, as it left the Philippine area of Responsibility.

On the morning of August 17, Kai-tak made landfall over the Leizhou peninsula in southern China as a typhoon. Within 6 hours, Kai-tak made a second landfall over the northeast coast of Vietnam and weakened slightly to a tropical storm. Later that night, the JTWC issued their final warning on the system as it weakened further and sped up inland. The JMA stopped tracking the storm early the next morning, no longer considering it a tropical cyclone.

=== Typhoon Tembin (Igme) ===
- Typhoon (JMA)
- Category 4 typhoon (SSHWS)
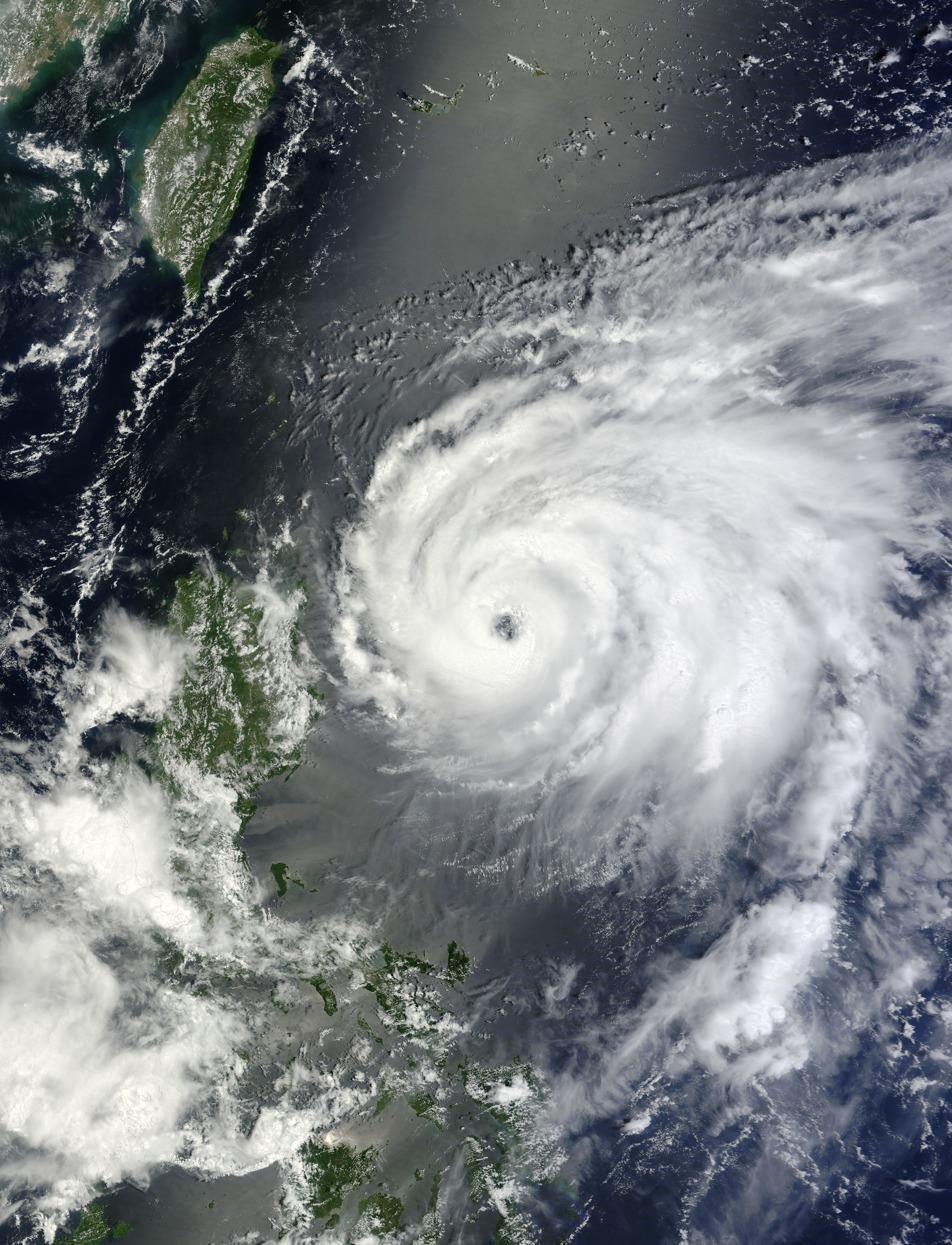
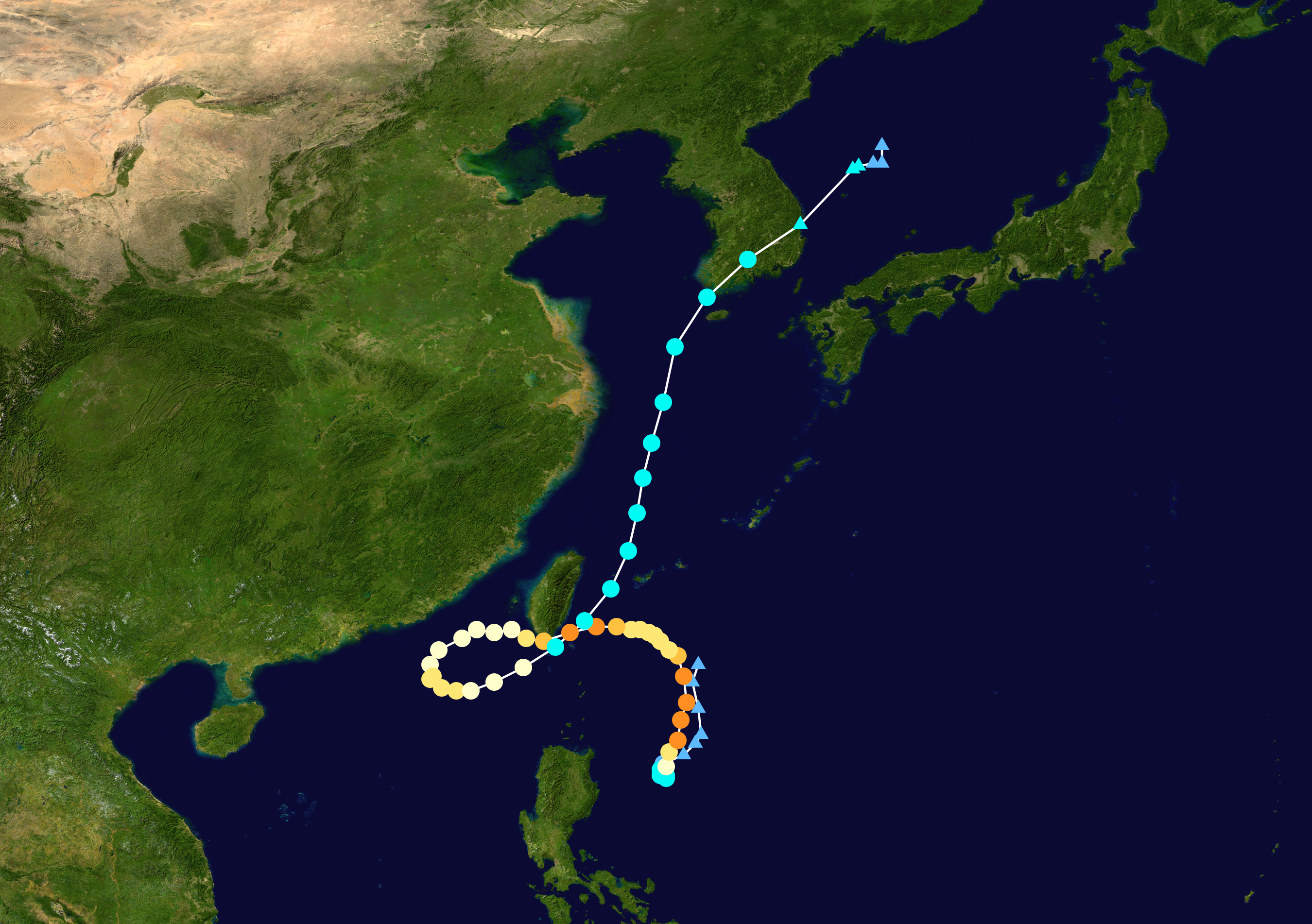
- Duration: August 17 – August 30
- Peak intensity: 150 km/h (90 mph) (10-min); 950 hPa (mbar)

On August 16, a tropical disturbance formed southeast of Taiwan. On August 17, the JMA mentioned it as a tropical depression, as a subtropical ridge pushed the system southwards. The JTWC issued a TCFA on the system late on August 18; early on the next day, the JMA upgraded it to a tropical storm and named it Tembin, and the JTWC upgraded it to a tropical depression. Soon, the PAGASA also upgraded it to a tropical depression and named it Igme. On August 20, Tembin entered a period of explosive intensification by excellent dual outflow, prompting both the JMA and the JTWC upgrading it to a typhoon. By the end of the same day, Tembin reached its initial peak intensity as a Category 4 typhoon, before it started to weaken by the next day as a TUTT cell developed over the system.

On August 22, Tembin began reintensify, as an eye feature was forming once again. By the next day, Tembin re-intensified into a category 3 typhoon, before it made landfall over Pingtung, Taiwan later on the same day. Due to land interaction, the JMA downgraded Tembin to a severe tropical storm early on August 24, and the JTWC downgraded it to a tropical storm later. Soon, the JTWC upgraded Tembin to a typhoon when it moved into the South China Sea. Late on August 25, the JMA upgraded Tembin to a typhoon again, and the system intensified into a category 2 typhoon early on the next day. Afterwards, Typhoon Tembin interacted with the nearby Typhoon Bolaven. Over the next few days, Tembin made a counterclockwise loop eastward, moving back into the Philippine Area of Responsibility (PAR) in the process, causing more rainfall over in the Philippines. Afterwards, the JTWC downgraded the system to a tropical storm late on August 27, as it turned north-northeastward. The JMA soon downgraded it to a severe tropical storm by the next day. On August 30, Tembin made landfall on South Korea, and transitioned into an extratropical storm.

=== Typhoon Bolaven (Julian) ===
- Very strong typhoon (JMA)
- Category 4 typhoon (SSHWS)
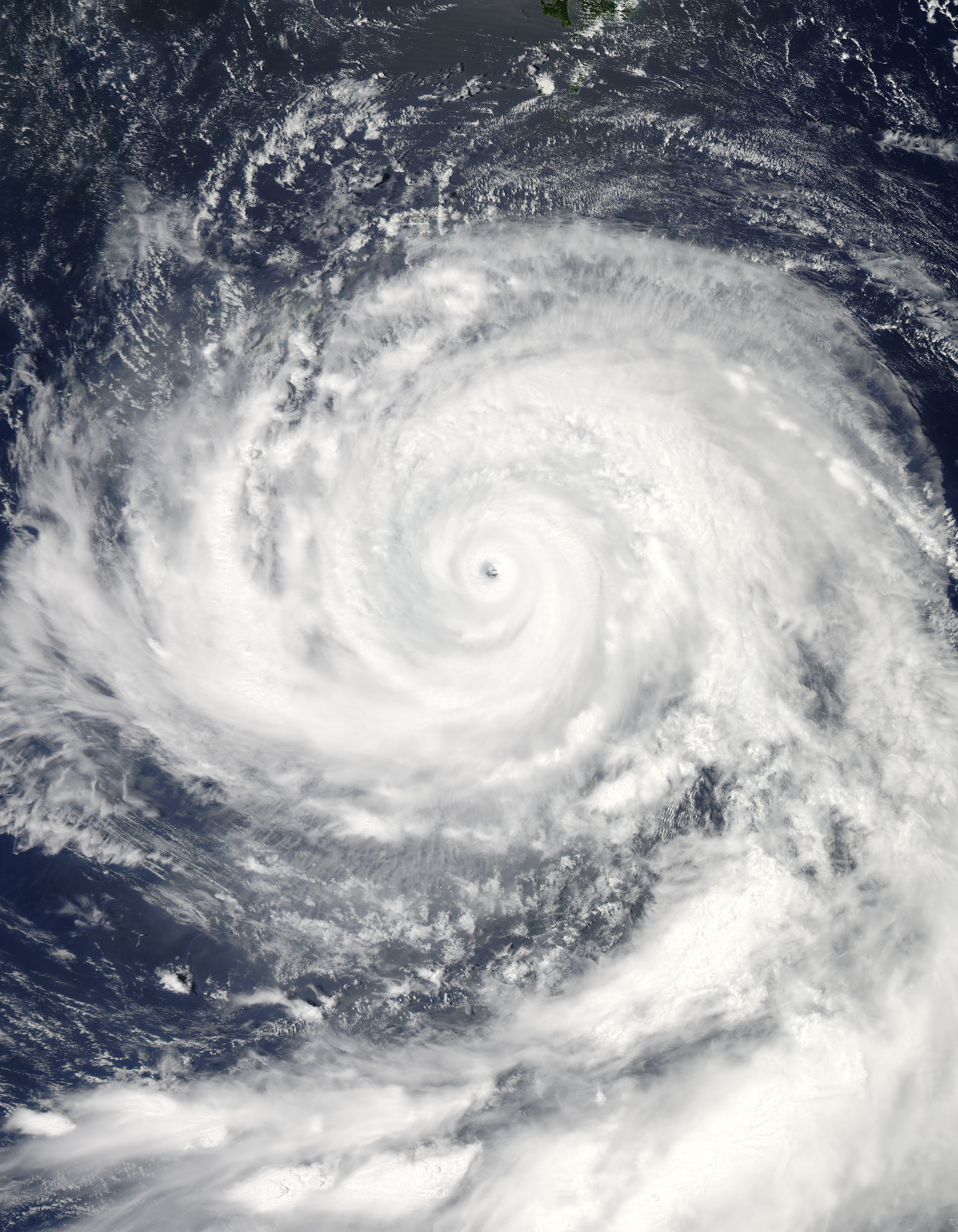
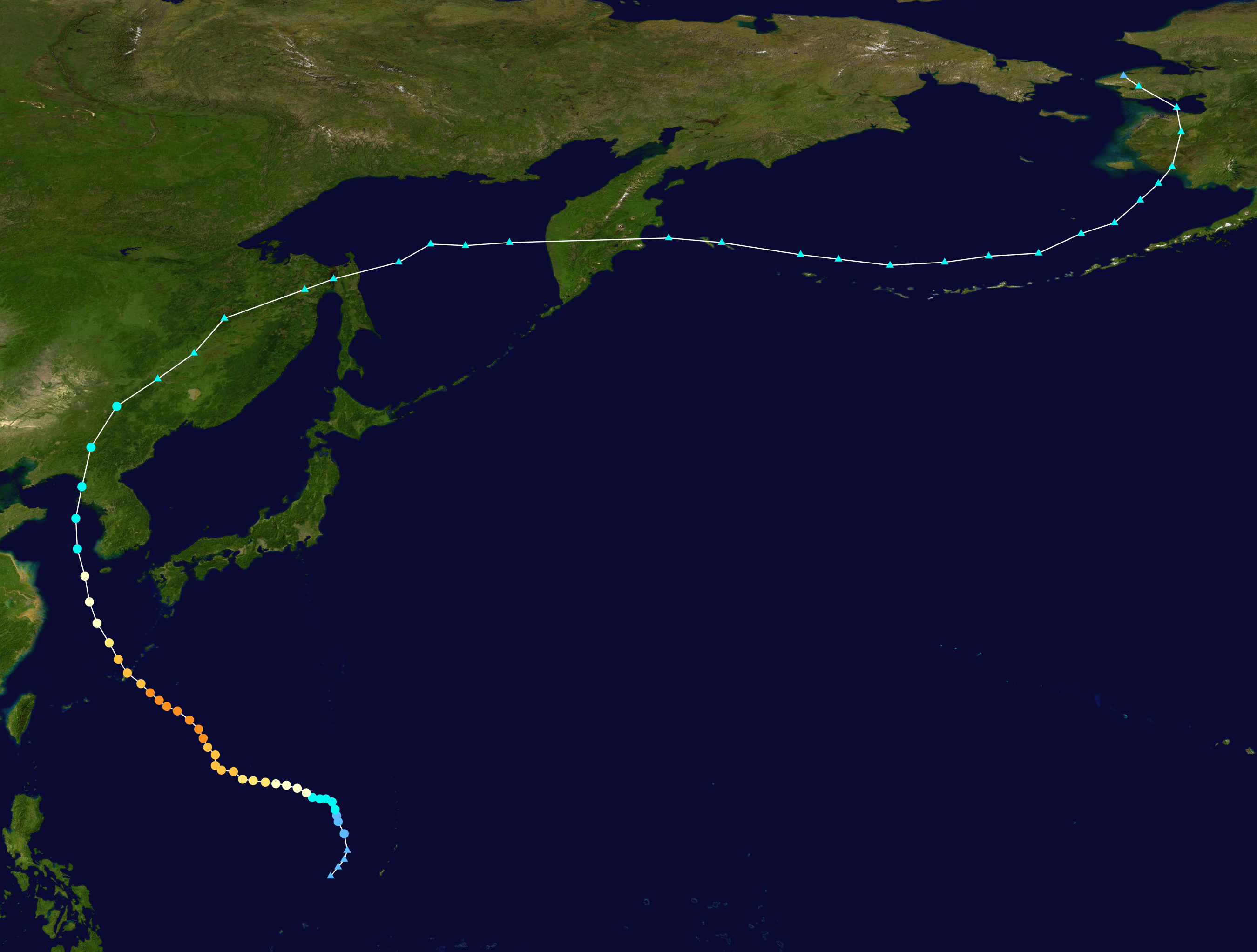
- Duration: August 19 – August 29
- Peak intensity: 185 km/h (115 mph) (10-min); 910 hPa (mbar)

Forming as a tropical depression on August 19 to the southwest of the Mariana Islands, Bolaven steadily intensified as it slowly moved west-northwestward in a region favoring tropical development. The system was soon upgraded to a tropical storm less than a day after formation and further to a typhoon by August 21. Strengthening became more gradual thereafter as Bolaven grew in size. On August 24, the system attained its peak intensity with winds of 185 km/h (115 mph) and a barometric pressure of 910 mbar (hPa; 26.87 inHg). Weakening only slightly, the storm passed directly over Okinawa on August 26 as it began accelerating toward the north. Steady weakening continued as Bolaven approached the Korean Peninsula and it eventually made landfall in North Korea late on August 28 before transitioning into an extratropical cyclone. The remnants rapidly tracked northeastward and was last noted over the Russian Far East.

Although Bolaven struck the Ryukyu Islands as a powerful typhoon, damage was less than expected. Relatively few buildings were damaged or destroyed across the region. The most significant effects stemmed from heavy rains, amounting to 551.5 mm (21.71 in), that caused flash flooding and landslides. One person drowned on Amami Ōshima after being swept away by a swollen river. In mainland Japan, two people drowned after being swept away by rough seas. In South Korea, 19 people were killed by the storm. Many buildings were damaged and approximately 1.9 million homes were left without power. Losses in the country reached ₩420 billion (US$374.3 million), the majority of which was due to destroyed apple orchards. Significant damage also took place in North Korea where at least 59 people were killed and 50 others were reported missing. Additionally, 6,700 homes were destroyed. Offshore, nine people drowned after two Chinese vessels sank. Total economic losses in China were counted to be CNY 19.82 billion (US$3.126 billion).

=== Typhoon Sanba (Karen) ===
- Violent typhoon (JMA)
- Category 5 super typhoon (SSHWS)
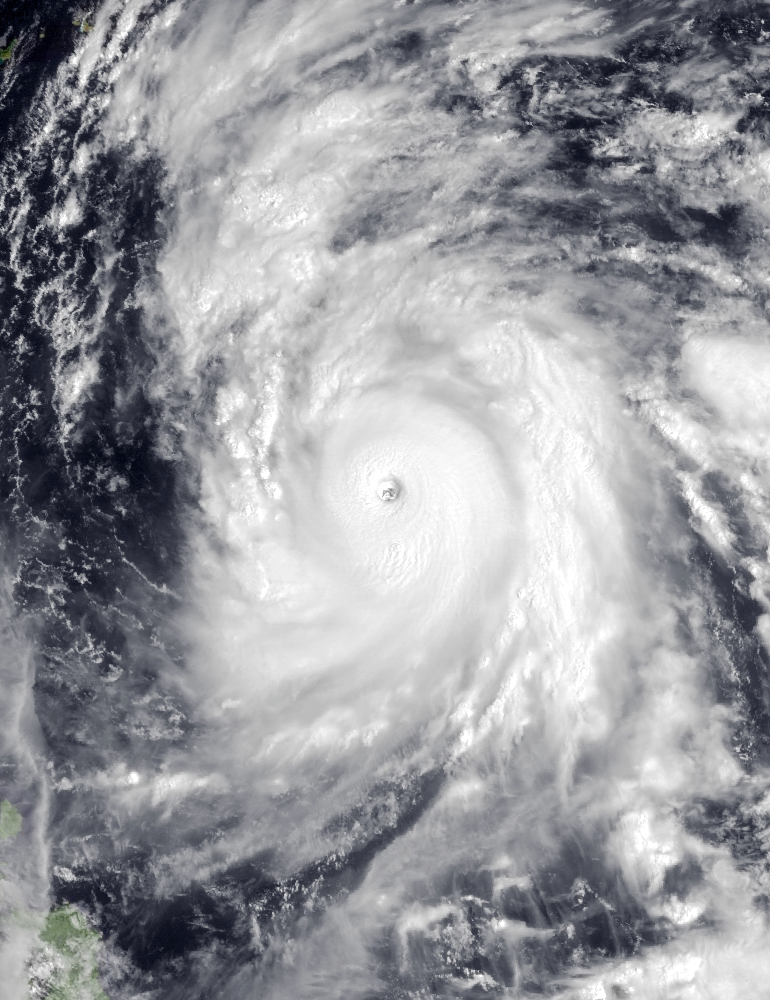
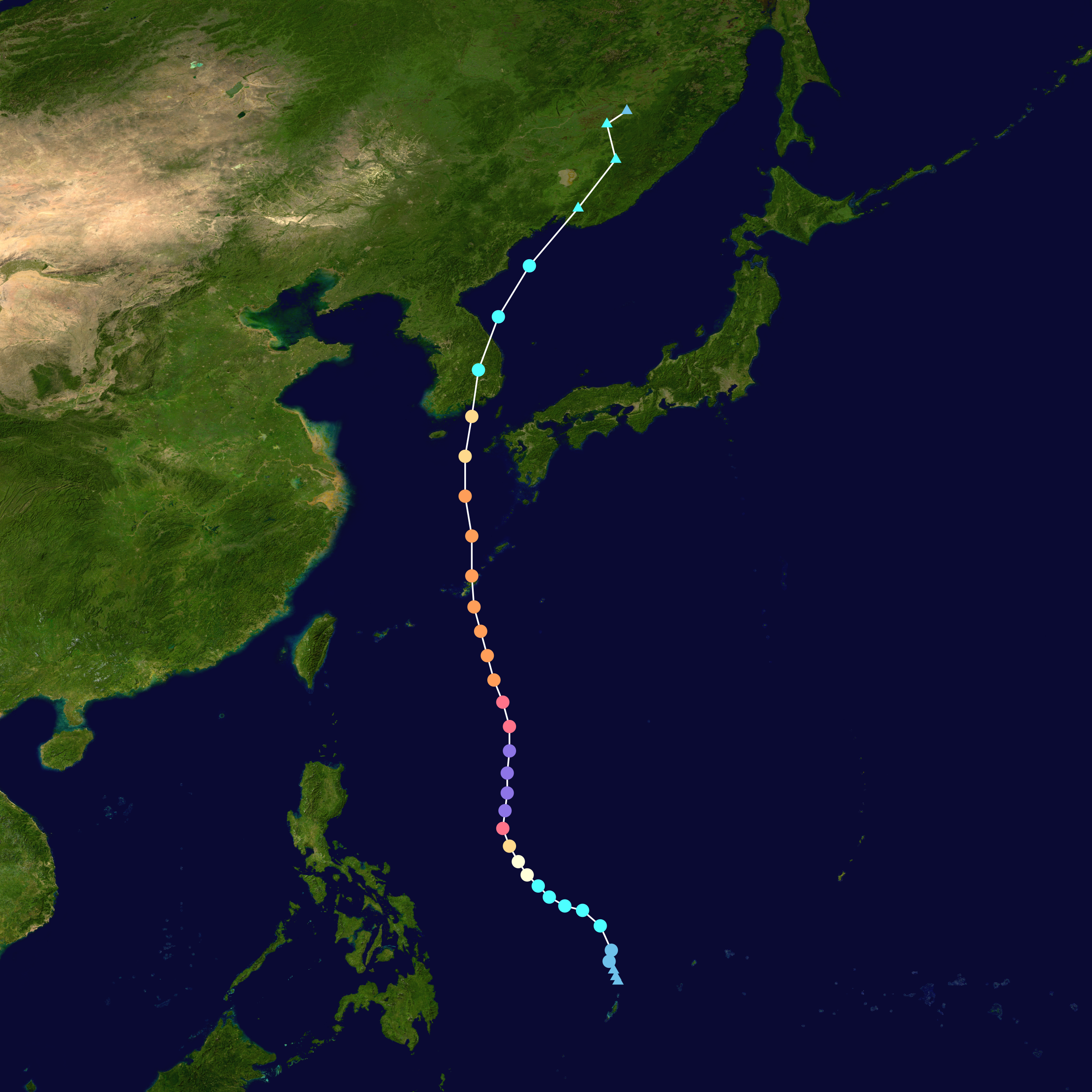
- Duration: September 10 – September 18
- Peak intensity: 205 km/h (125 mph) (10-min); 900 hPa (mbar)

A low-pressure area formed east of Palau on September 9. On September 10, both the JMA and the JTWC upgraded it to a tropical depression. As the system entered the PAR early on September 11, the PAGASA named it Karen. At the same time, the JMA upgraded the system to a tropical storm and named it Sanba, and the JTWC also upgraded it to a tropical storm later. Late on September 12, Sanba began explosive intensification, prompting the JMA upgrading it to a severe tropical storm and even a typhoon later. On September 13, the JTWC reported that Sanba rapidly strengthened into a category 5 super typhoon, the strongest since Megi in 2010. By the next day, the system started to weaken as it had undergone an eyewall replacement cycle. It soon ended up with a 57 kilometer-wide eye. On September 17, Sanba made landfall over South Korea.

In Kōchi Prefecture, Japan, 222 hectares (548 acres) of agricultural land was damaged by the storm, with losses reaching ¥50 million (US$640 thousand). Throughout Okinawa, damage to agriculture, forestry, and fisheries amounted to ¥900 million (US$11.5 million).

=== Typhoon Jelawat (Lawin) ===
- Violent typhoon (JMA)
- Category 5 super typhoon (SSHWS)
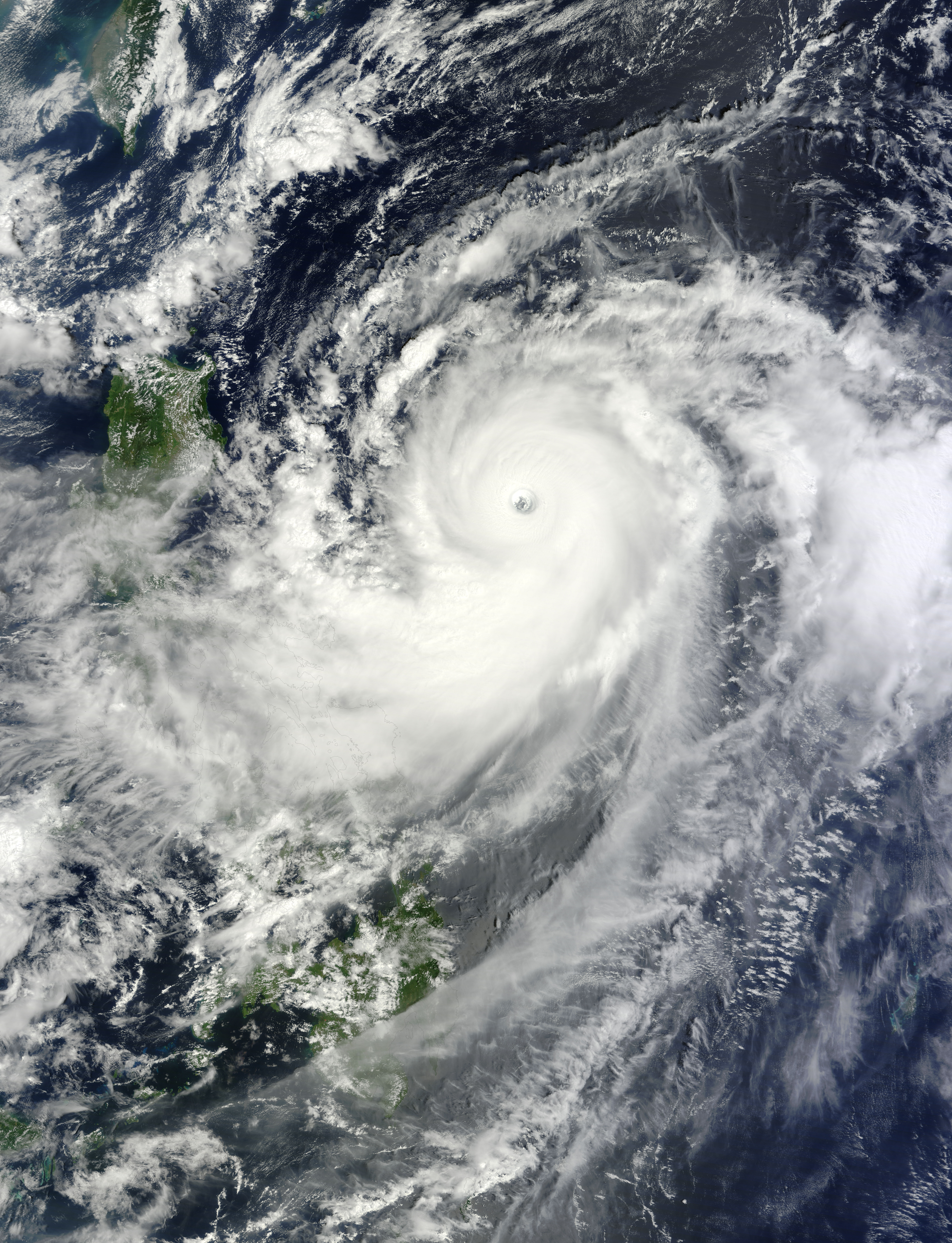
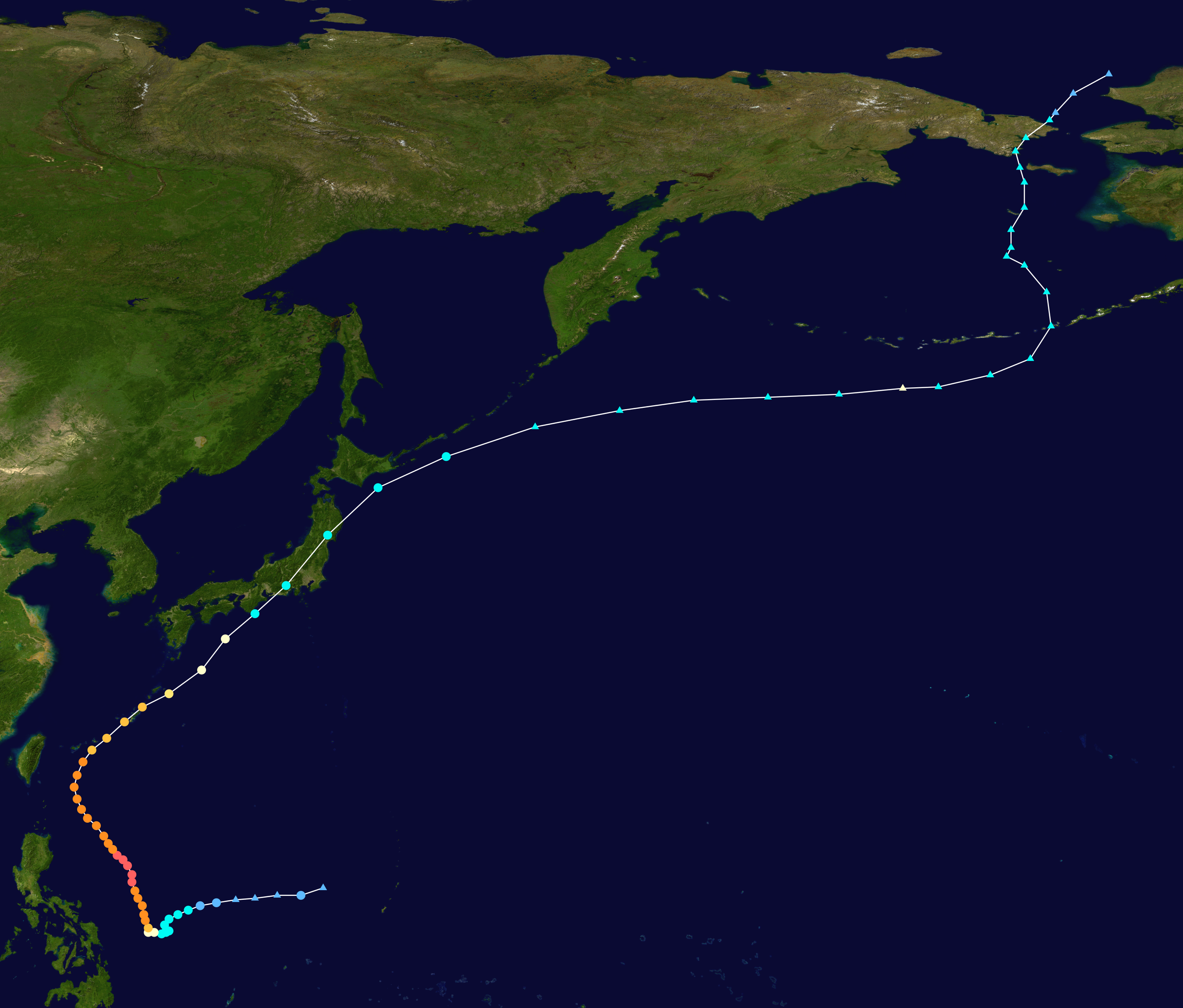
- Duration: September 20 – October 1
- Peak intensity: 205 km/h (125 mph) (10-min); 905 hPa (mbar)

On September 18, a tropical disturbance formed to the east of Guam. Late on the next day, the JTWC issued a TCFA on the system. By September 20, both the JMA and the PAGASA upgraded the low-pressure area to a tropical depression, with the latter naming it as Lawin. The JTWC subsequently followed suit and upgraded it to a tropical depression. Late on the same day, the JMA upgraded the system to a tropical storm and named it Jelawat, and so did the JTWC. Half a day later, the JMA upgraded Jelawat to a severe tropical storm. Early on September 23, both the JMA and the JTWC upgraded Jelawat to a typhoon. It started to undergo explosive intensification, becoming a category 4 typhoon in 12 hours, as it developed a small eye. Late on September 24, as Jelawat developed a 19-kilometre-wide (12 mi) eye, the JTWC upgraded the system to a category 5-equivalent super typhoon. By the next day, the system started its eyewall replacement cycle. By September 26, it weakened to a Category 4 super typhoon as it completed the cycle, with its eye becoming 74 kilometers across by the next day. On September 28, it started another eyewall replacement cycle. This led to the system weakening to a category 3-equivalent typhoon, and a category 2-equivalent system on the next day due to cooling sea surface temperatures. It further weakened to a category 1-equivalent typhoon late on the same day. On September 30, the JTWC downgraded Jelawat to a tropical storm, before it made landfall on Japan a few hours later. The JMA downgraded Jelawat to a severe tropical storm late on the same day, with the JTWC issuing its final advisory. The JMA further downgraded the system to a tropical storm by the next day, before it fully became an extratropical cyclone six hours later.

=== Severe Tropical Storm Ewiniar ===
- Severe tropical storm (JMA)
- Tropical storm (SSHWS)
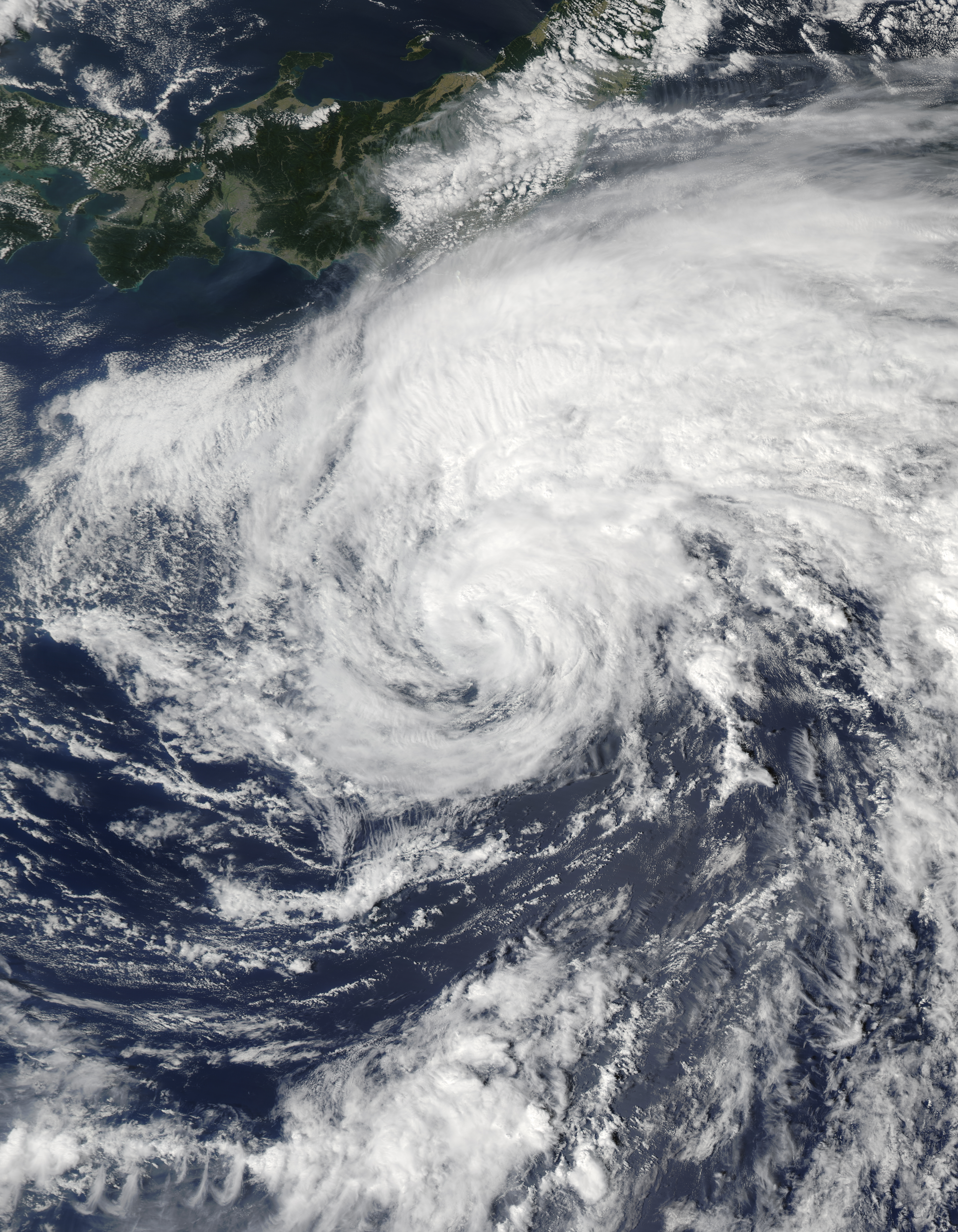
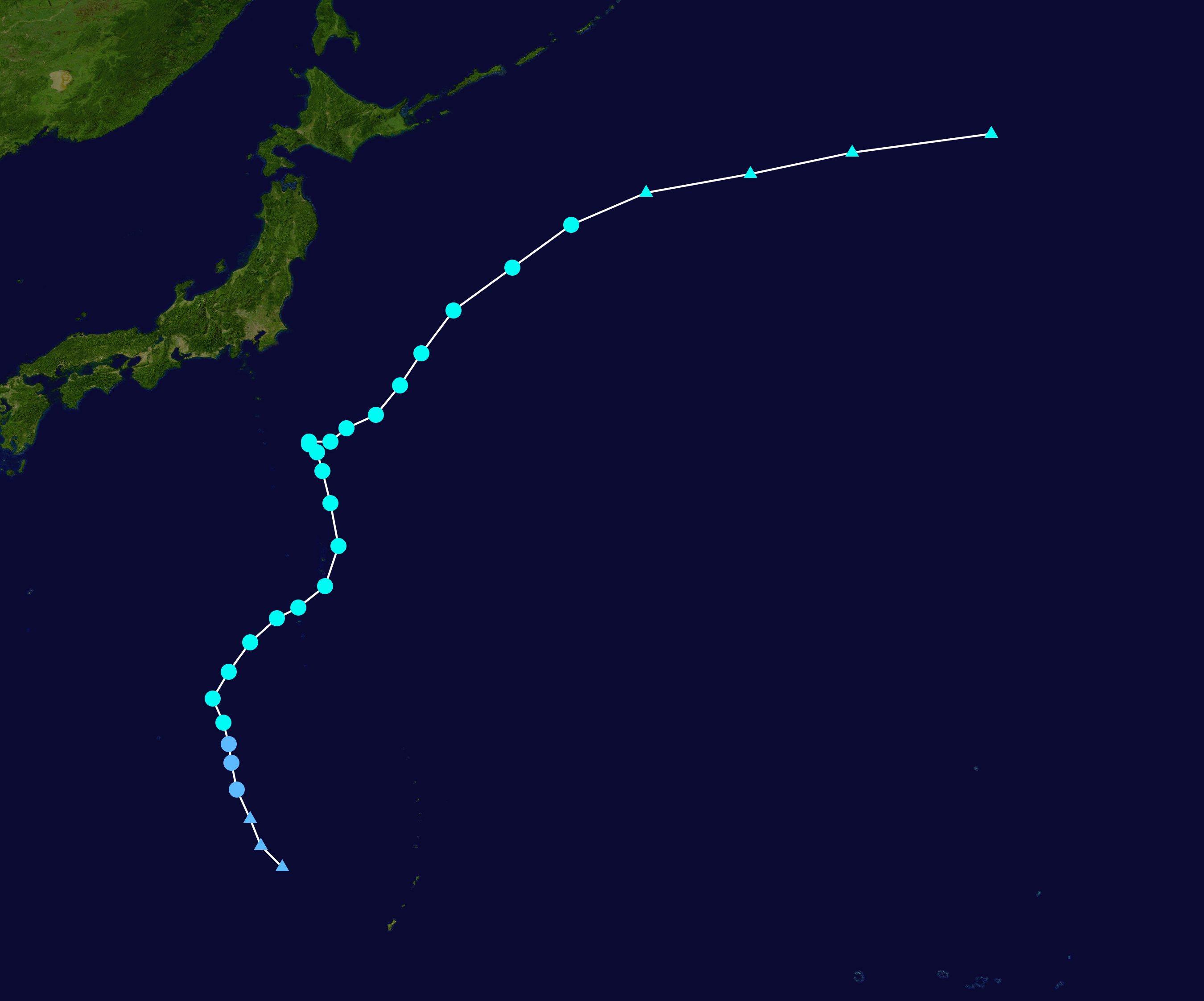
- Duration: September 23 – September 30
- Peak intensity: 95 km/h (60 mph) (10-min); 985 hPa (mbar)

On September 22, the JTWC reported that a low-pressure area was developing to the west of Guam, around 650 nautical miles (1,200 km) east-northeast of Typhoon Jelawat. By the next day, the JMA upgraded it to a tropical depression. On September 24, the JTWC upgraded the system to a tropical depression, although deep convection was displaced to the south due to moderate vertical wind shear associated with Jelawat, leaving its low-level circulation center exposed. The center then began to consolidate, with deep convection wrapping over its eastern quadrant, prompting both the JMA and the JTWC to upgrade the system to a tropical storm, with the former naming it as Ewiniar.

Moving north-northeastward along the periphery of the subtropical ridge, Ewiniar's center continued to be displaced from the main convection due to moderate wind shear. By September 26, Ewiniar struggled to maintain its deep convection due to the continued effects of wind shear. Despite that, the JMA upgraded Ewiniar into a severe tropical storm. On the next day, the system reached peak intensity as it turned northward, with weakening convection wrapping to its center, before it became embedded within a subtropical trough. However, deep convection wrapped the system as it became quasi-stationary late on the same day, before returning to a northeastward track soon after. By the next day, Ewiniar's center became partially exposed, and it began to weaken. On September 29, the JMA downgraded the system to a tropical storm, as convection was being displaced to the northeast of its center by strong vertical wind shear. The JTWC issued their final advisory on the same day, as Ewiniar's center fully separated from its convection, and had undergone extratropical transition. Ewiniar then became extratropical by the next day.

=== Severe Tropical Storm Maliksi ===
- Severe tropical storm (JMA)
- Tropical storm (SSHWS)
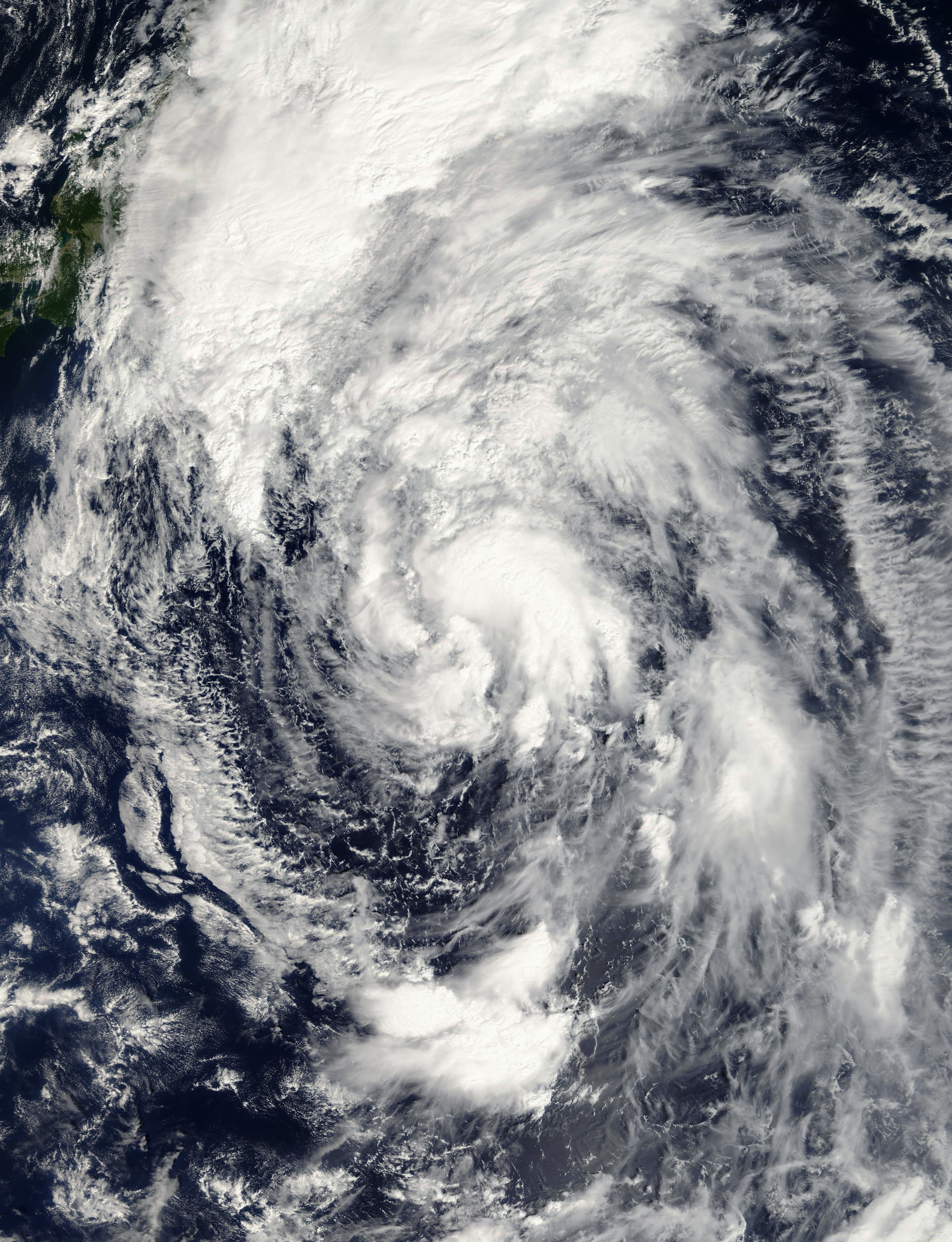
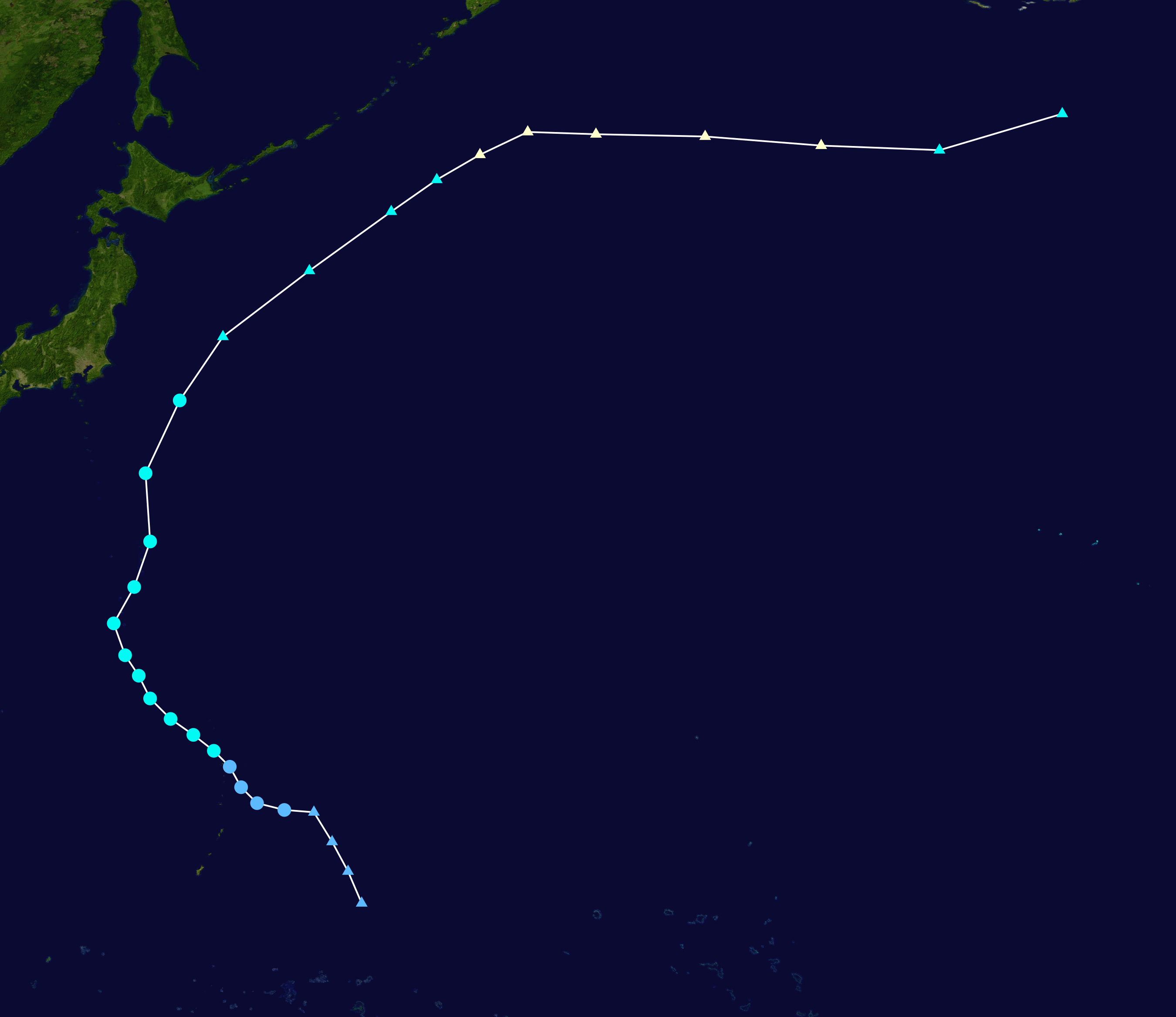
- Duration: September 29 – October 4
- Peak intensity: 95 km/h (60 mph) (10-min); 985 hPa (mbar)

On September 28, the JTWC started to monitor an area of convection approximately 80 nautical miles (150 km) to the northwest of Chuuk. At the time, it had a broad but slowly developing low-level circulation center, and was under a marginal environment of warm sea surface temperatures, weak vertical wind shear and limited poleward outflow. As the system's center began to consolidate, the JMA upgraded it to a tropical depression by the next day. Half a day later, the JTWC issued a TCFA on the system, as its center became better defined, with convection wrapping into it, before it subsequently upgraded the system to a tropical depression, designating it as 20W. As the system continued to organize itself, the JMA upgraded it to a tropical storm by October 1, naming it as Maliksi. The JTWC subsequently followed suit, although its deep convection to the southeast were yet to wrap towards its center.

Moving northwestward under the southwest periphery of the subtropical ridge, Maliksi continued to improve its center by the next day, with convective banding wrapping tightly towards it. However, microwave imagery showed the system had become less organized 12 hours later, with its center becoming elongated. Nonetheless, the JMA upgraded Maliksi to a severe tropical storm late on the same day, as it began to improve once again. As it turned to the northeast, deep convection from the system became isolated to the east, due to increasing wind shear and unfavorable conditions as it started transitioning to an extratropical system. As a result, the JTWC issued their final advisory on Maliksi late on October 3, as convection became greatly sheared to the northeast. The system then became fully extratropical by the next day. The extratropical system went on to merge with a front, becoming an intense hurricane-force low on October 5, before reforming near the Aleutian Islands and dissipating near Alaska on October 11.

As the system was developing near the Mariana Islands, tropical storm warnings were issued in Alamagan, Pagan and Agrihan on October 1. However, as Maliksi moved northwest, the warnings were cancelled by the next day.

=== Severe Tropical Storm Gaemi (Marce) ===
- Severe tropical storm (JMA)
- Tropical storm (SSHWS)
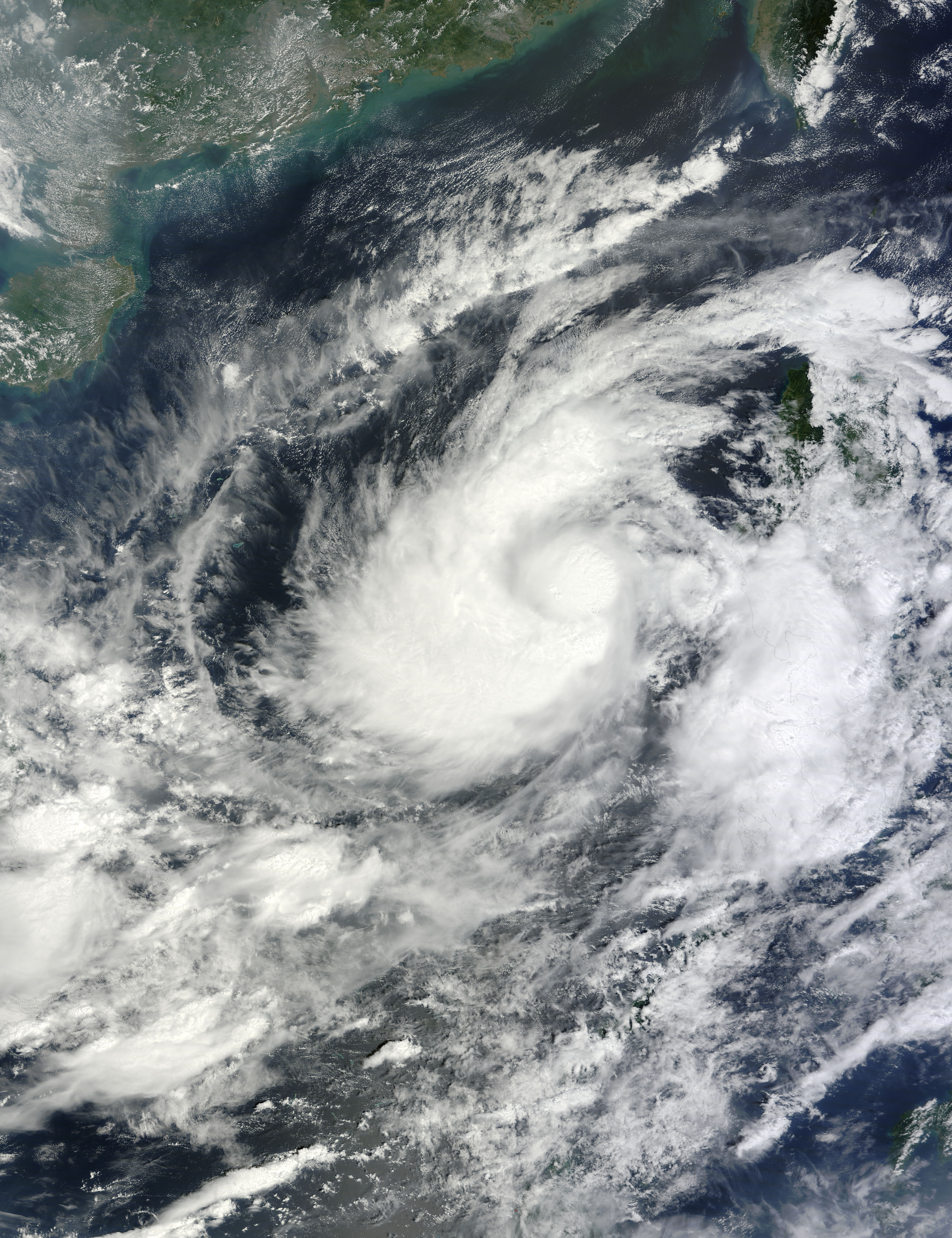
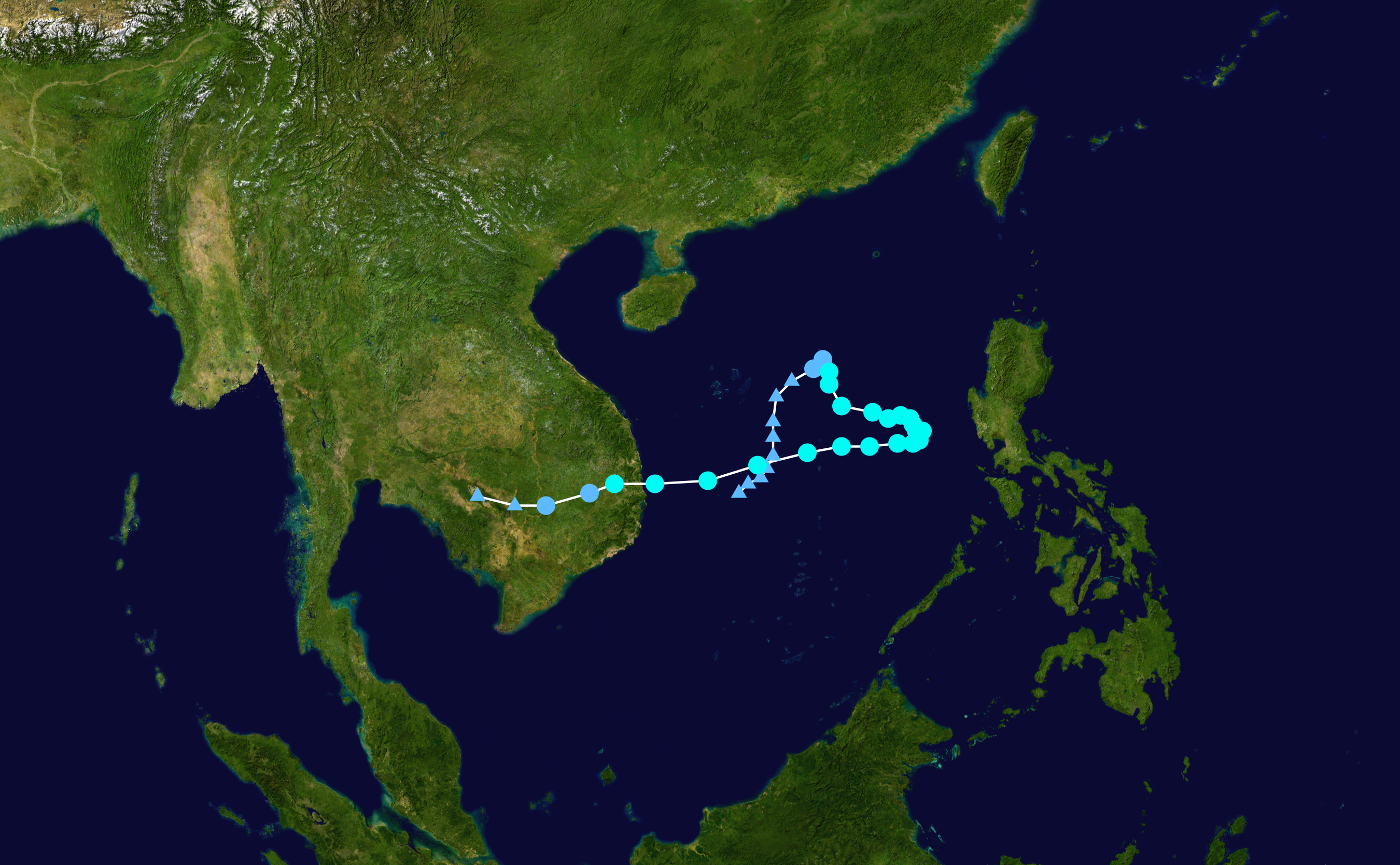
- Duration: September 29 – October 7
- Peak intensity: 95 km/h (60 mph) (10-min); 990 hPa (mbar)

On September 29, the JTWC started to monitor an area of convection, within a monsoon trough, approximately 325 nmi (602 km) to the southeast of Huế, Vietnam. At the time, it already had an organizing low-level circulation center, and was within a low to moderate wind shear environment. The JMA soon upgraded it to a tropical depression. As the depression became quasi-stationary, deep convection consolidated over its center, prompting the JTWC to issue a TCFA by the next day. On October 1, the JMA upgraded the system into a tropical storm, naming it as Gaemi. At the same time, the JTWC started issuing advisories on Gaemi as a tropical depression, before subsequently upgrading it to a tropical storm, as a scatterometer pass indicated gale-force winds within the system.

Within a weak steering environment, Gaemi moved southward under the influence of a near-equatorial ridge, as it continued to improve. By the next day, Gaemi entered the Philippine Area of Responsibility (PAR) as deep convection continued to wrap the system, with the PAGASA assigning its local name Marce. With a central dense overcast over the system's center, the JMA upgraded Gaemi to a severe tropical storm on October 3, as it turned to the west-southwest as a building subtropical ridge to the north took command of the system's steering influence. The JTWC originally anticipated the storm to strengthen into a typhoon under favorable conditions, however, increasing easterly wind shear sheared the system's convection to the west as it turned east by the next day, with its center becoming fully exposed. As a result, the JMA downgraded Gaemi to a tropical storm. Returning to a westward track, Gaemi remained fully exposed by October 5, and was deteriorating under the continued effects of wind shear. Later that same day, it exited the PAR, with the PAGASA issuing their final advisory on the storm. Gaemi then slightly reintensified by the next day, with deep convection covering its center but most of the convection remained isolated to its west. At 6:00 pm ICT (11:00 UTC), it made landfall over Phú Yên Province in Vietnam. The JMA subsequently downgraded Gaemi to a tropical depression, with the JTWC issuing their final advisory on the system. The remnants then spawned an area of convection that developed into Depression BOB 01 in the Bay of Bengal.

As Gaemi, locally known as Marce, moved near the Philippines, signal #1 warnings were issued in Bataan and Zambales. The storm brought heavy rainfall, resulting in a dike partially collapsing in Occidental Mindoro and the evacuation of 5 families. 14 student-mountaineers were rescued after being trapped at Papaya River Base Camp in Mariveles, Bataan due to rains caused by Gaemi. A storm surge was reported at San Antonio, Zambales in October 3, damaging 23 houses, and in Calintaan, Occidental Mindoro in October 5, damaging 28 houses. A 59-year old fisherman was found dead along the shore of Nasugbu, Batangas, after two motorbancas with 3 fishermen onboard capsized amid big waves and strong winds caused by Gaemi. In Vietnam, the storm killed 5 people.

=== Typhoon Prapiroon (Nina) ===
- Very strong typhoon (JMA)
- Category 3 typhoon (SSHWS)
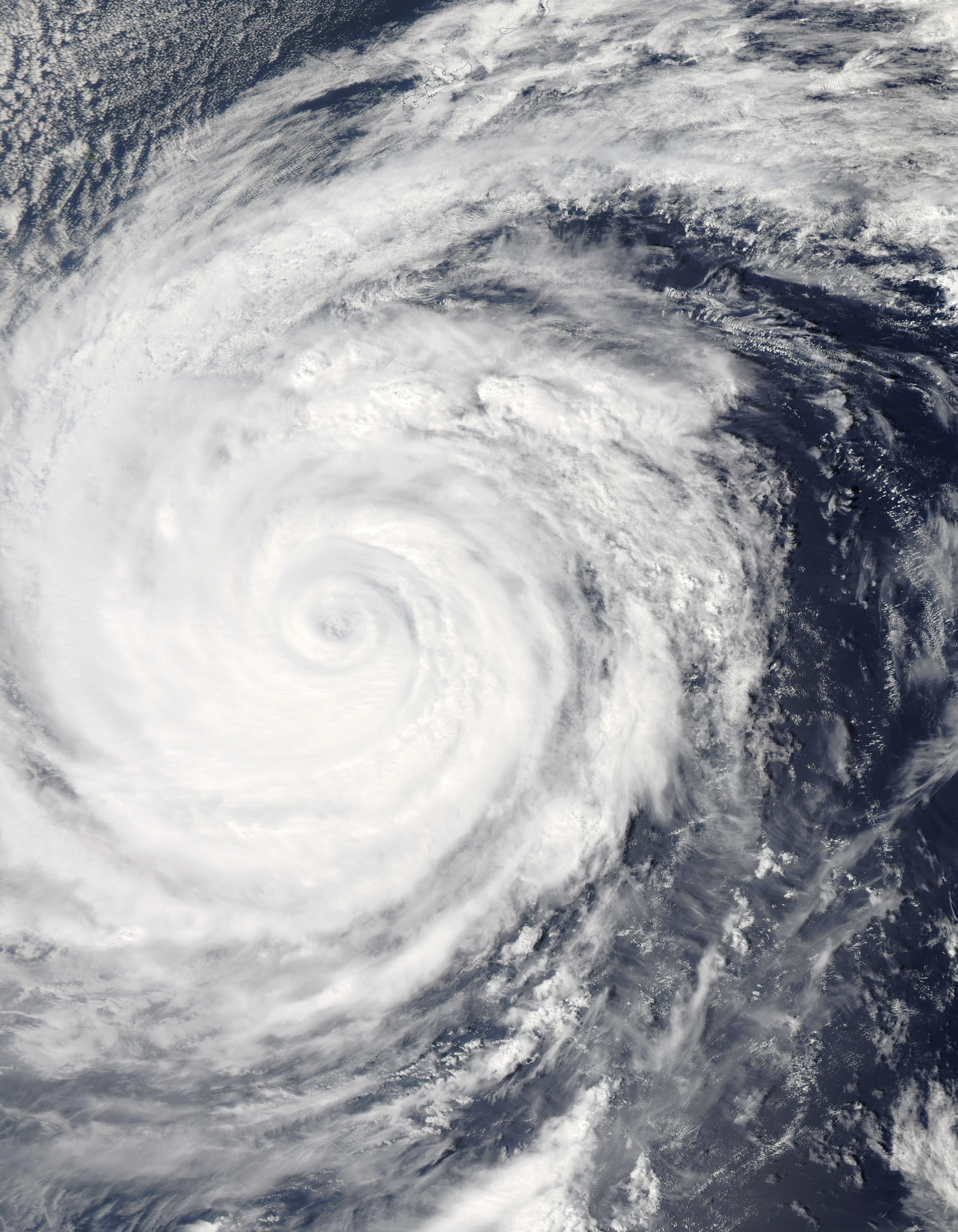
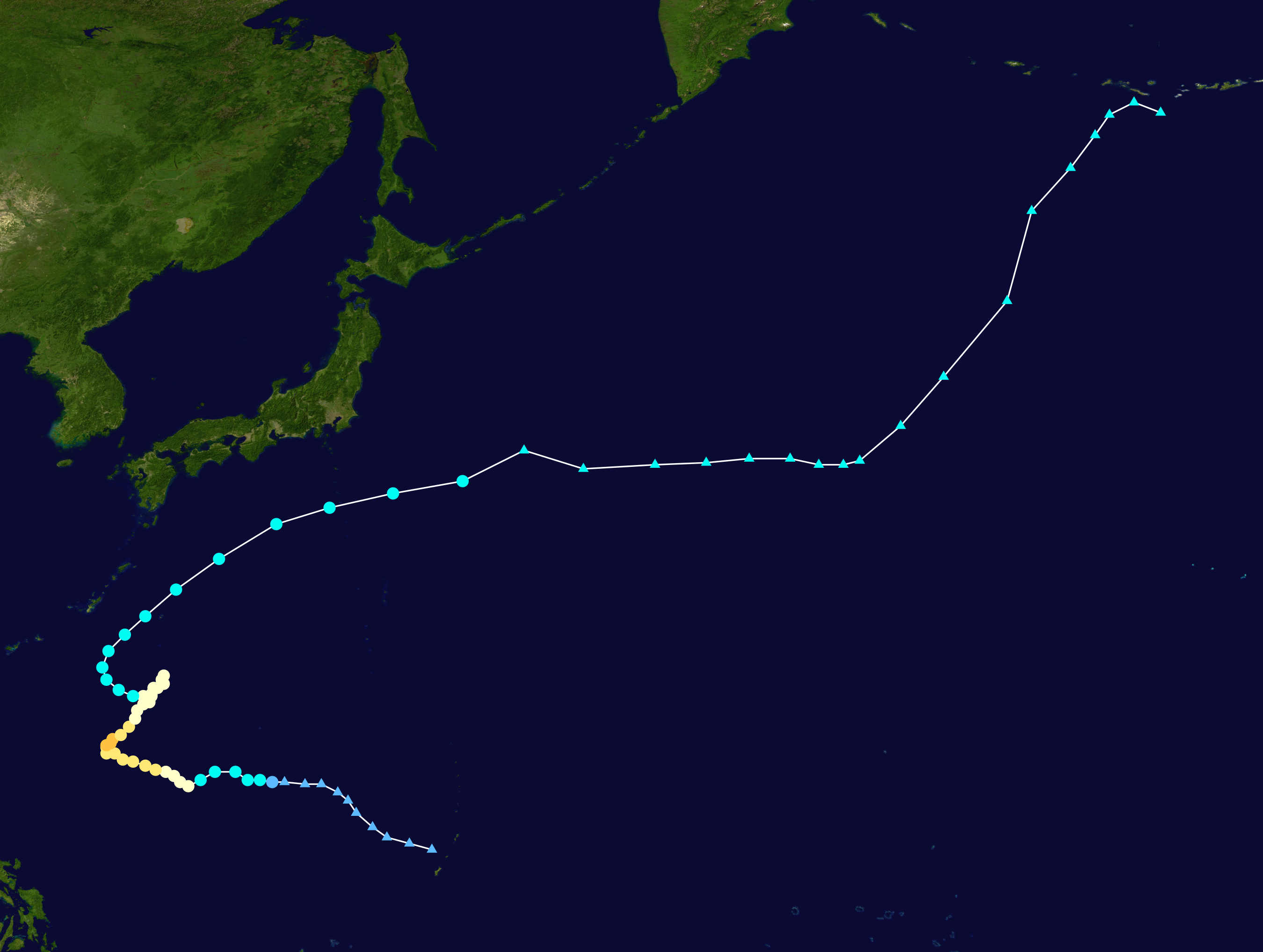
- Duration: October 5 – October 19
- Peak intensity: 165 km/h (105 mph) (10-min); 940 hPa (mbar)

On October 5, the JMA began monitoring a tropical depression about 115 km (70 mi) northwest of Hagåtña, Guam. It had a consolidating low-level center in warm waters with marginal wind shear. As convection increased and banding improved, the JTWC issued a TCFA the next day. On October 7, the JMA upgraded it to Tropical Storm Prapiroon. The JTWC began advisories as a depression, then upgraded it to a storm due to rapid organization and deep banding. By October 8, it became a severe tropical storm with tightly curved banding while moving west. PAGASA named it Nina upon entering PAR.

Later that day, the JMA upgraded Prapiroon to a typhoon as banding strengthened. The JTWC followed on October 9 as an eye formed. It intensified to a Category 2-equivalent typhoon by October 10. Becoming quasi-stationary, it developed an 18 nmi (33 km) eye and peaked as a Category 3-equivalent typhoon late October 11. It weakened to Category 2 on October 12 as its eye degraded. By October 13, it weakened further to Category 1 due to upwelling. Prapiroon moved slowly as steering shifted, briefly forming a 15 nmi (28 km) eye. On October 15, it reintensified to a secondary peak with a 60 nmi (110 km) eye in a col region. It weakened later that day due to reduced convection. By October 16, it was downgraded to a severe tropical storm due to dry air intrusion. It then tracked northeast with an exposed center as cold air entered. It exited PAR the same day. On October 18, it accelerated while weakening due to dry air, wind shear, and subsidence. It became embedded in a baroclinic zone and began extratropical transition. The JTWC issued its final advisory on October 19. Prapiroon completed extratropical transition 12 hours later and moved northeast, then north, last noted near the Aleutian Islands on October 23.

=== Severe Tropical Storm Maria ===
- Severe tropical storm (JMA)
- Tropical storm (SSHWS)
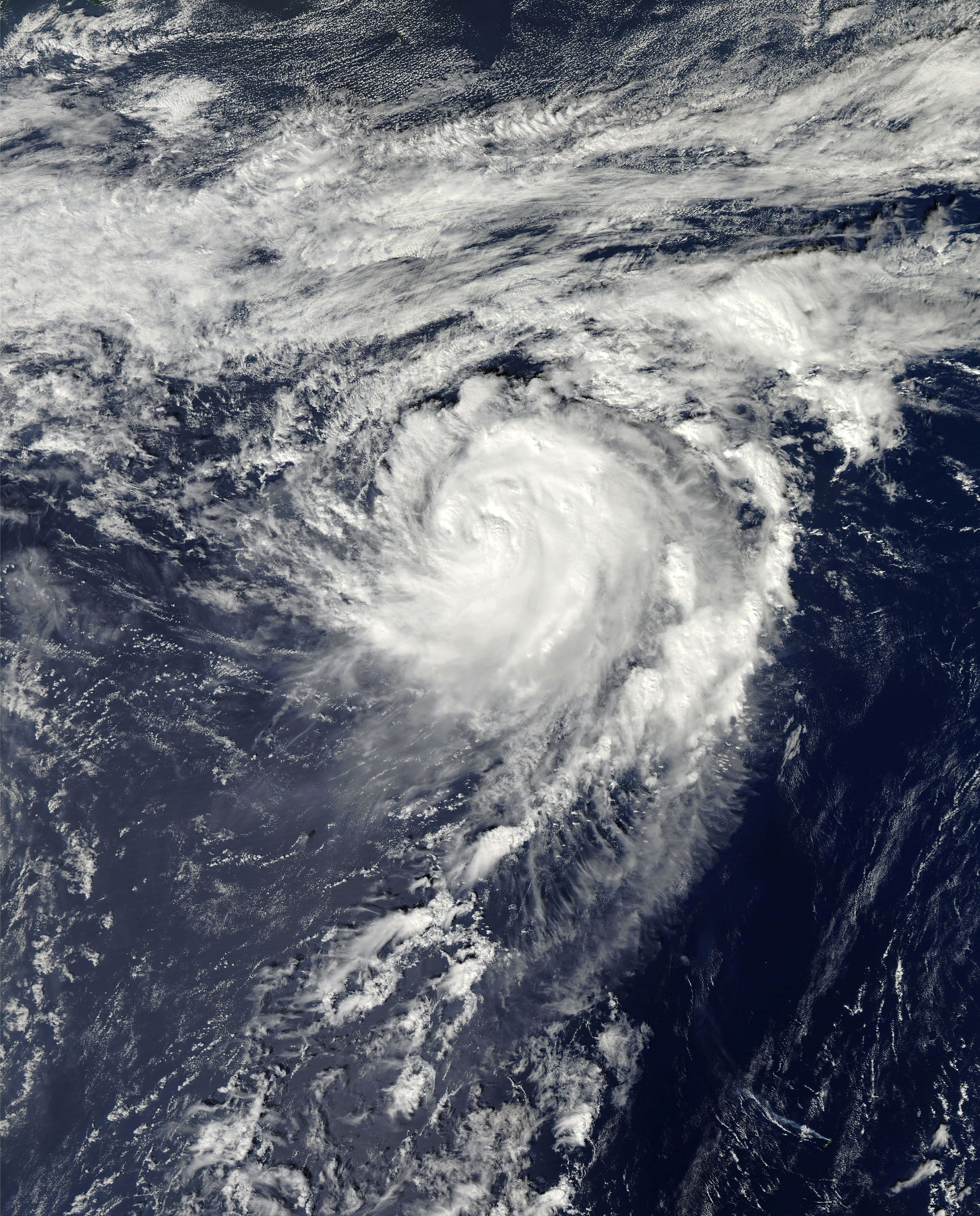
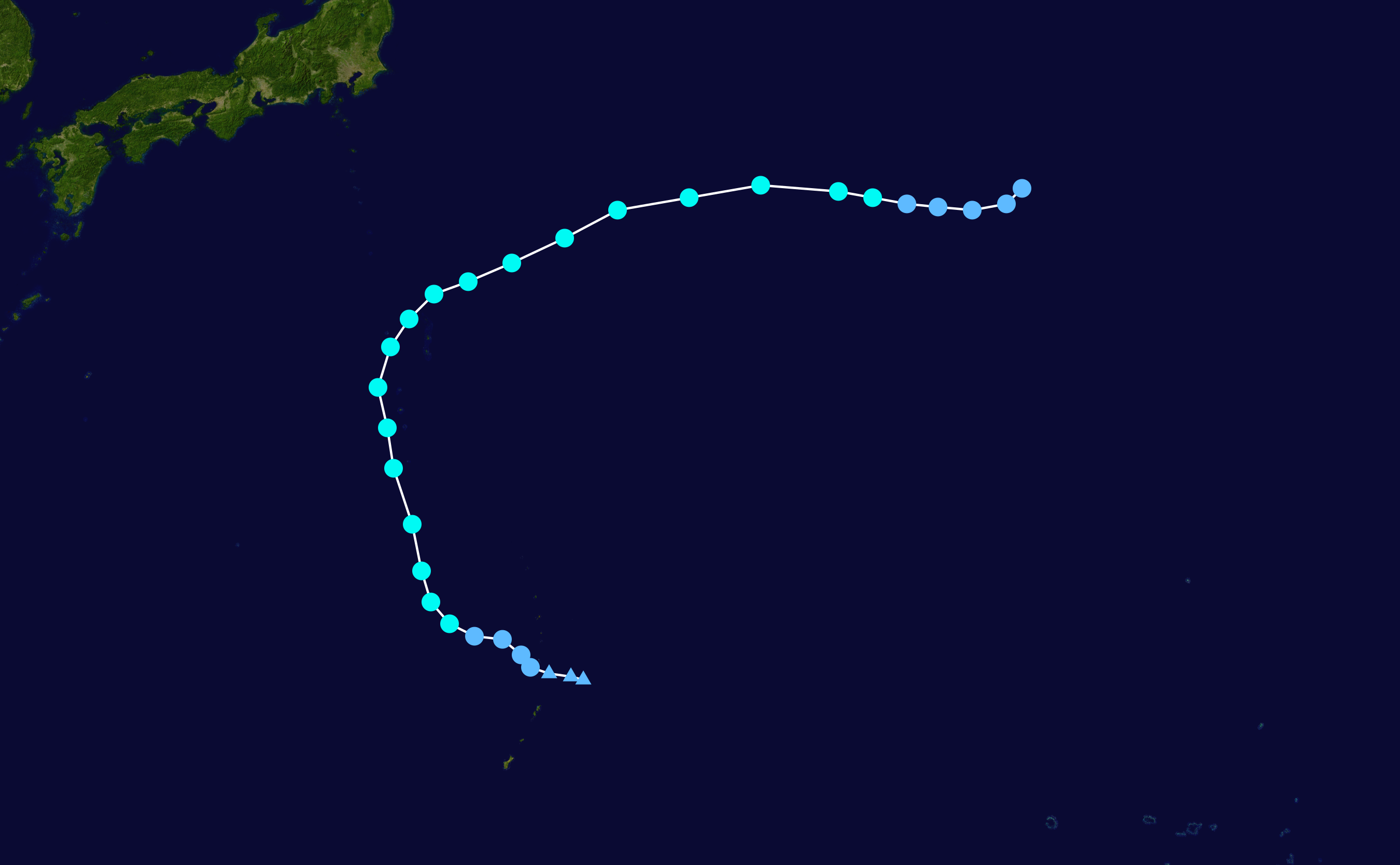
- Duration: October 12 – October 20
- Peak intensity: 95 km/h (60 mph) (10-min); 990 hPa (mbar)

Late on October 12, the JMA started to monitor a tropical depression that had developed about 400 km (250 mi) to the northeast of Guam. At the time, the system's convection was sheared to the southwest of its ill-defined & partially exposed low-level circulation center, and was under a low to moderate wind shear environment. As deep convection started to build over its center, the JTWC issued a TCFA early on October 14. Six hours later, the JMA upgraded the tropical depression to a tropical storm, naming it as Maria. At the same time, the JTWC started issuing advisories on Maria as a tropical depression, before subsequently upgrading it to a tropical storm, as convection continued to deepen.

Moving northwestward along the western periphery of the subtropical ridge, the JMA reported that Maria intensified into a severe tropical storm early by the next day. However, its deep convection became slightly displaced to the south, due to increasing wind shear. It soon wrapped into its center again, as wind shear decreased; however, the JMA downgraded Maria to a tropical storm by October 16. Maria then reached peak intensity, with an eye feature seen in microwave imagery. This became short-lived, as its deep convection began to be sheared to the east of the system due to increasing westerly flow aloft associated with a subtropical jet stream. By the next day, Maria's convection became displaced to the northeast of its center due to moderate to strong wind shear, as it accelerated northeastward. It soon recovered by early October 18, with centralized convection persisting over its center, but it was being impacted by mid-latitude flow around the subtropical ridge. However, 12 hours later, strong wind shear significantly sheared the system, exposing its center. By the next day, both the JMA and the JTWC downgraded Maria to a tropical depression, with the former issuing their final advisory, as the system's center was becoming elongated. The JTWC subsequently issued their final advisory on Maria as well. The remnants remained traceable until early on October 20, when the JMA reported that Maria had dissipated.

=== Typhoon Son-Tinh (Ofel) ===
- Very strong typhoon (JMA)
- Category 3 typhoon (SSHWS)
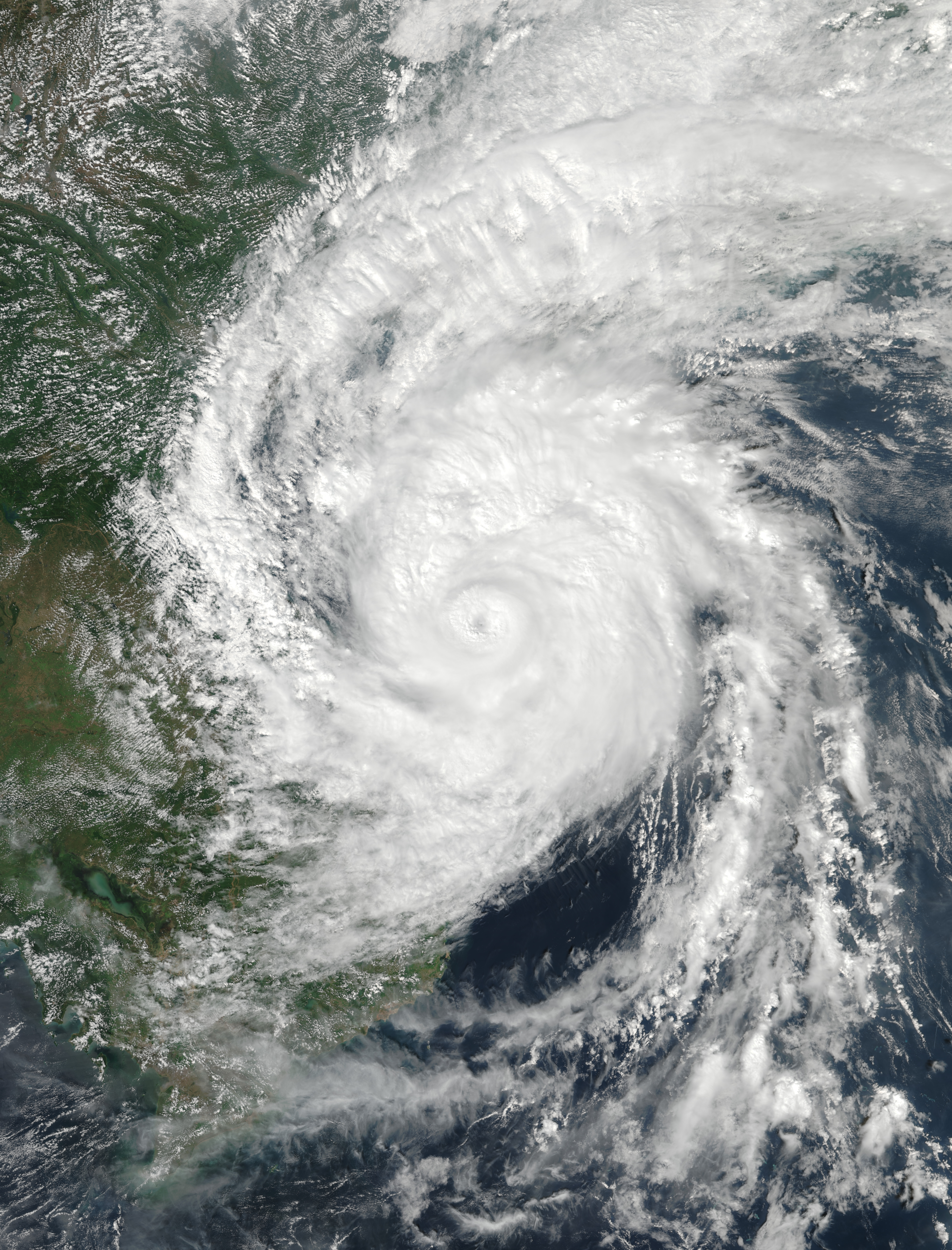
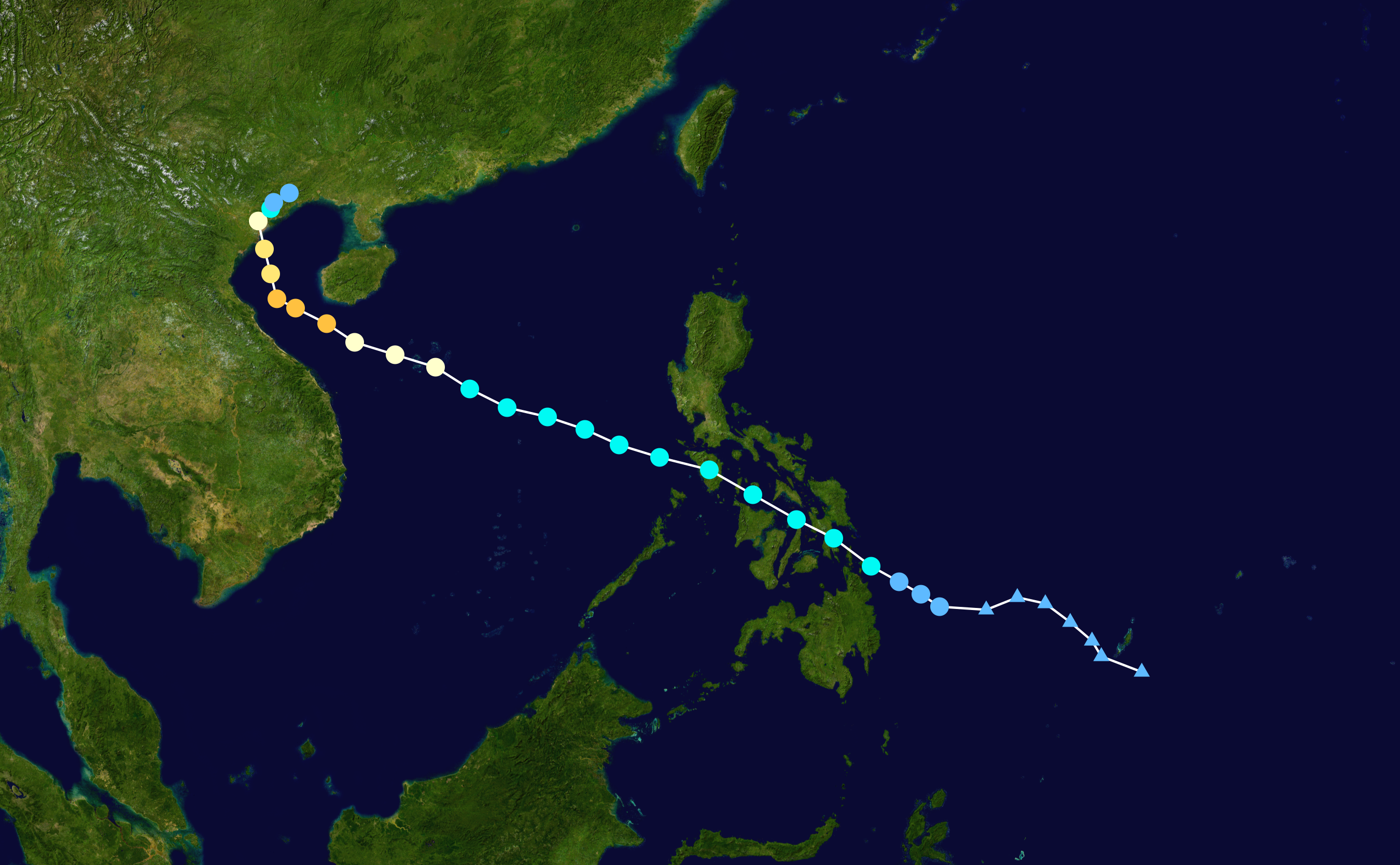
- Duration: October 21 – October 29
- Peak intensity: 155 km/h (100 mph) (10-min); 945 hPa (mbar)

On October 21, the JMA started to monitor a tropical depression near Palau. By the next day the PAGASA started to monitor the tropical depression and named it Ofel. Late on October 23, the JMA upgraded the tropical depression to a tropical storm, naming it Son-Tinh. It subsequently made landfall over Leyte as a tropical storm, and traversed the Philippines. On October 25, Son-Tinh strengthened into a severe tropical storm. Son-Tinh reached typhoon strength on October 27. Late on October 27, the system rapidly strengthened into a category 3 typhoon in just 6 hours, as it developed a ragged eye, but soon developed into a well defined eye. After affecting Vietnam and Hainan Island, it weakened rapidly, first to a tropical storm, and then to a tropical depression, due to land interaction and strong wind shear from the north west.

In the Philippines, widespread flooding was reported as rivers burst their banks, in some instances rising as much as 12.8 meters in 24 hours. A cargo ship called the ML Lady RP II, sank with around 1,200 sacks of copra near Zamboanga City at the height of the storm. Strong winds derailed a train in Quezon. Throughout the Philippines, 27 people were killed by the storm and damage amounted to PHP155 million (US$3.74 million).

=== Tropical Depression 25W ===
- Tropical depression (JMA)
- Tropical depression (SSHWS)
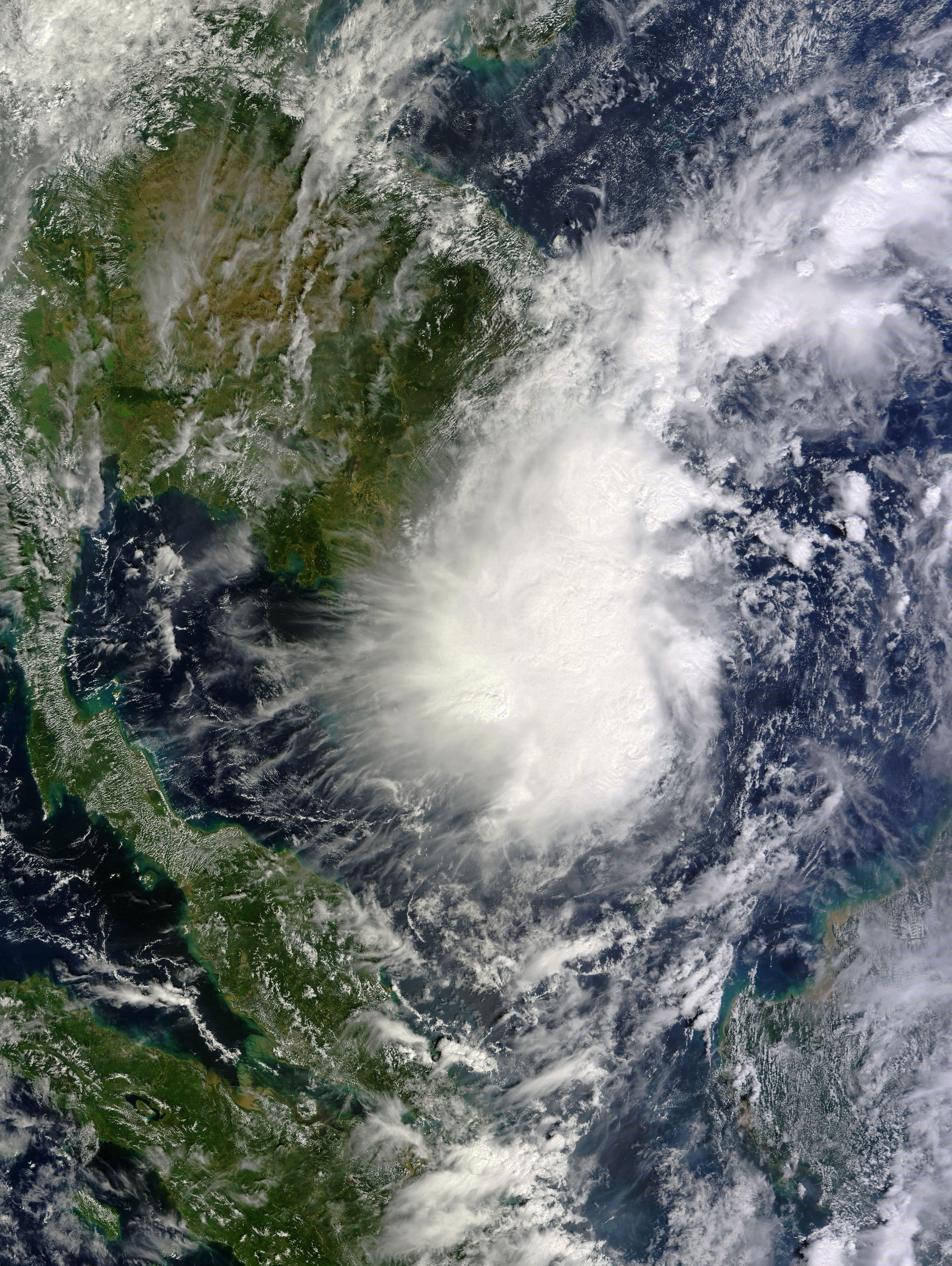
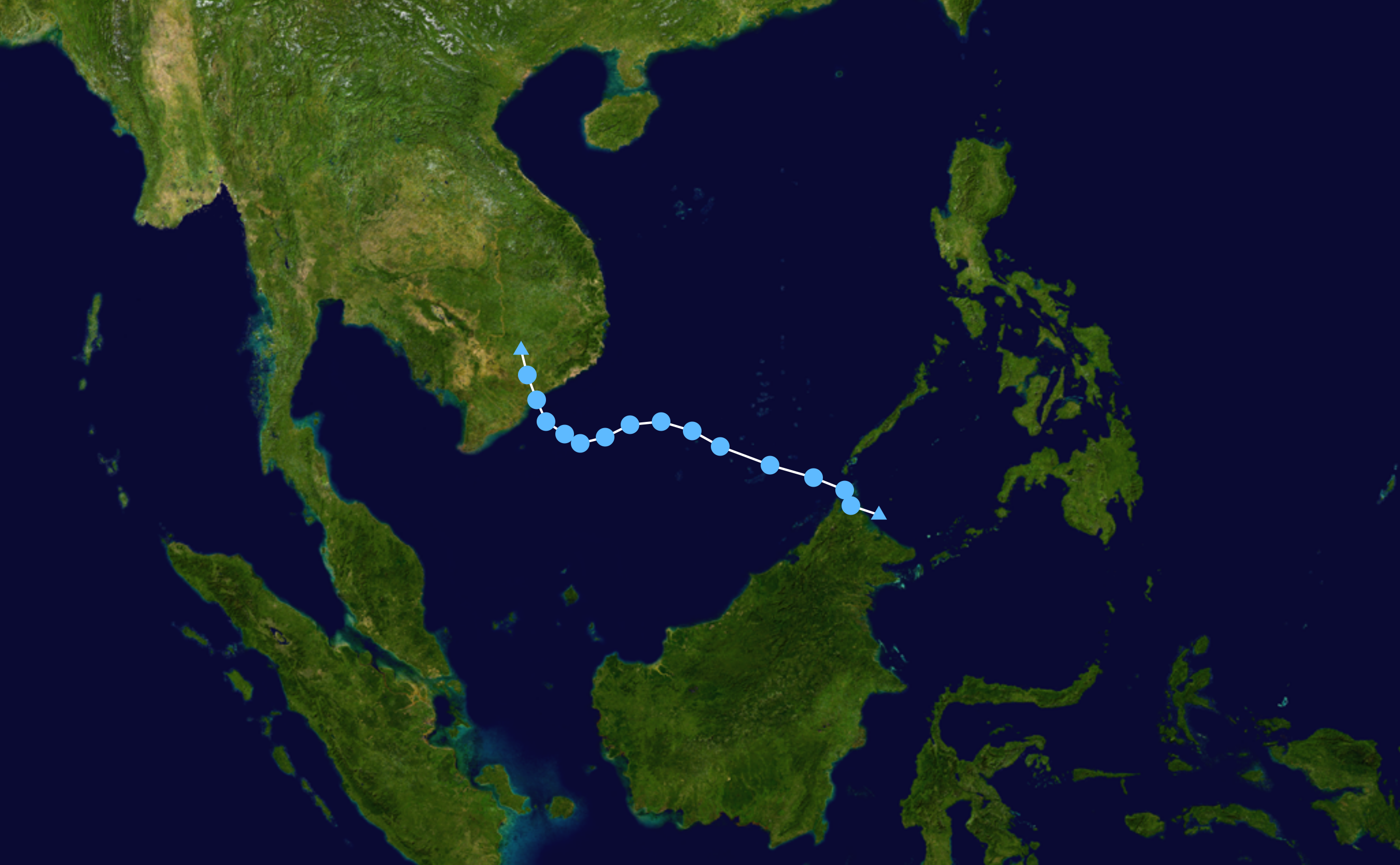
- Duration: November 12 – November 15
- Peak intensity: 55 km/h (35 mph) (10-min); 1004 hPa (mbar)

Early on November 12, the JTWC reported that a tropical disturbance had developed within an area of weak to moderate vertical windshear, about 315 km (195 mi) to the southeast of Manila in the Philippines. Later that day as the system moved towards the north-northwest, the JTWC reported that the disturbance had become a tropical depression before the JMA followed suit early on November 13.

=== Typhoon Bopha (Pablo) ===
- Very strong typhoon (JMA)
- Category 5 super typhoon (SSHWS)
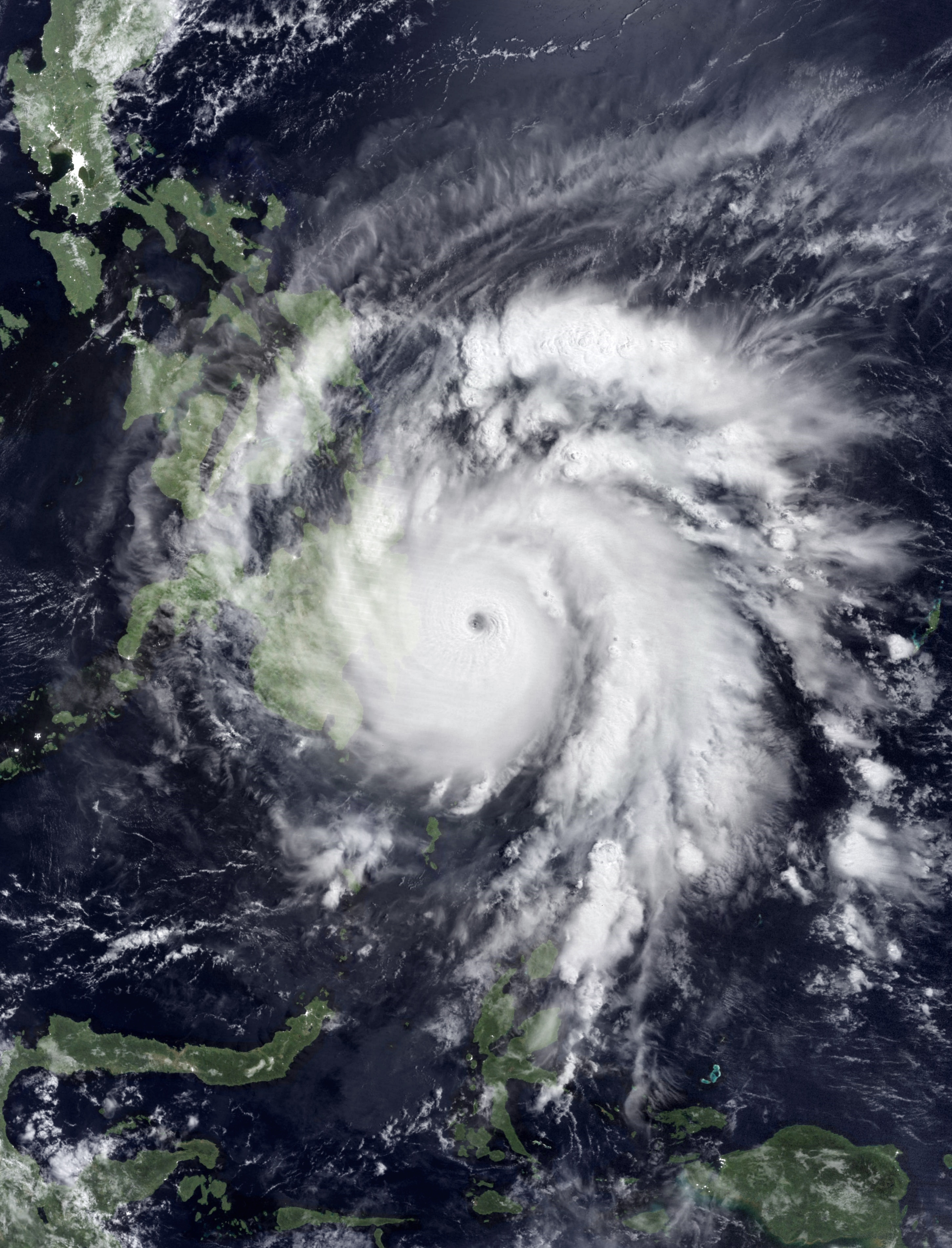
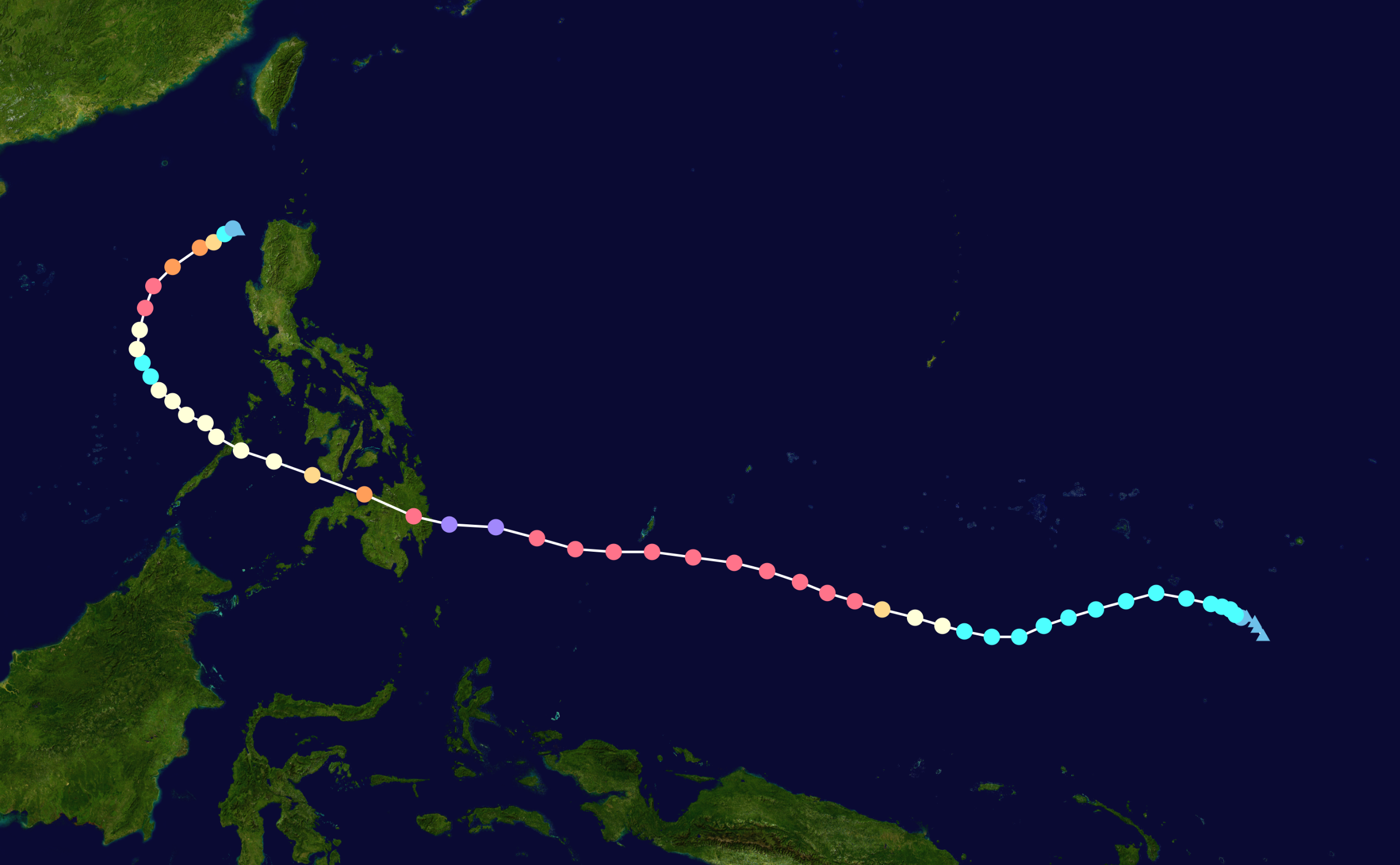
- Duration: November 25 – December 9
- Peak intensity: 185 km/h (115 mph) (10-min); 910 hPa (mbar)

On November 23, the JTWC reported that a large area of convection persisted 350 nautical miles (650 km; 400 mi) south of Pohnpei in the Caroline Islands. Its organization steadily improved over the next few days under a favorable conditions with warm sea surface temperatures. and on November 25 both JTWC and JMA upgraded its status to a Tropical Depression, while the JTWC designated it with 26W. During the early hours of November 26, an upper-level anticyclone formed over the center with near-radial outflow and weak vertical wind shear. Under its influence, 26W strengthened gradually and acquired tropical storm status by that evening. As a result, the JMA officially named the storm Bopha. On November 27, a deep centralized convective cover developed over the LLCC and the JTWC too upgraded Bopha into a tropical storm. By the evening of December 2, the storm entered the Philippine Area of Responsibility and was given the name Pablo. Late on December 3, the system rapidly intensified into a category 5-equivalent super typhoon, as the eye started to become well defined at 19 kilometers across. Bopha then made landfall in Mindanao at the same intensity. After landfall in Mindanao, Bopha weakened to a category 1-equivalent typhoon as it passed through Palawan island. On December 7, Bopha rapidly re-intensified, going from a Category 1 to a Category 4 in less than 6 hours. The next day, it weakened rapidly from a typhoon to a tropical storm due to moderate vertical wind shear. On December 9, the JTWC issued its final advisory as it weakened into tropical depression. Bopha was last noted about 70 kilometers north of Binabalian, Philippines that same day.

=== Tropical Storm Wukong (Quinta) ===
- Tropical storm (JMA)
- Tropical storm (SSHWS)
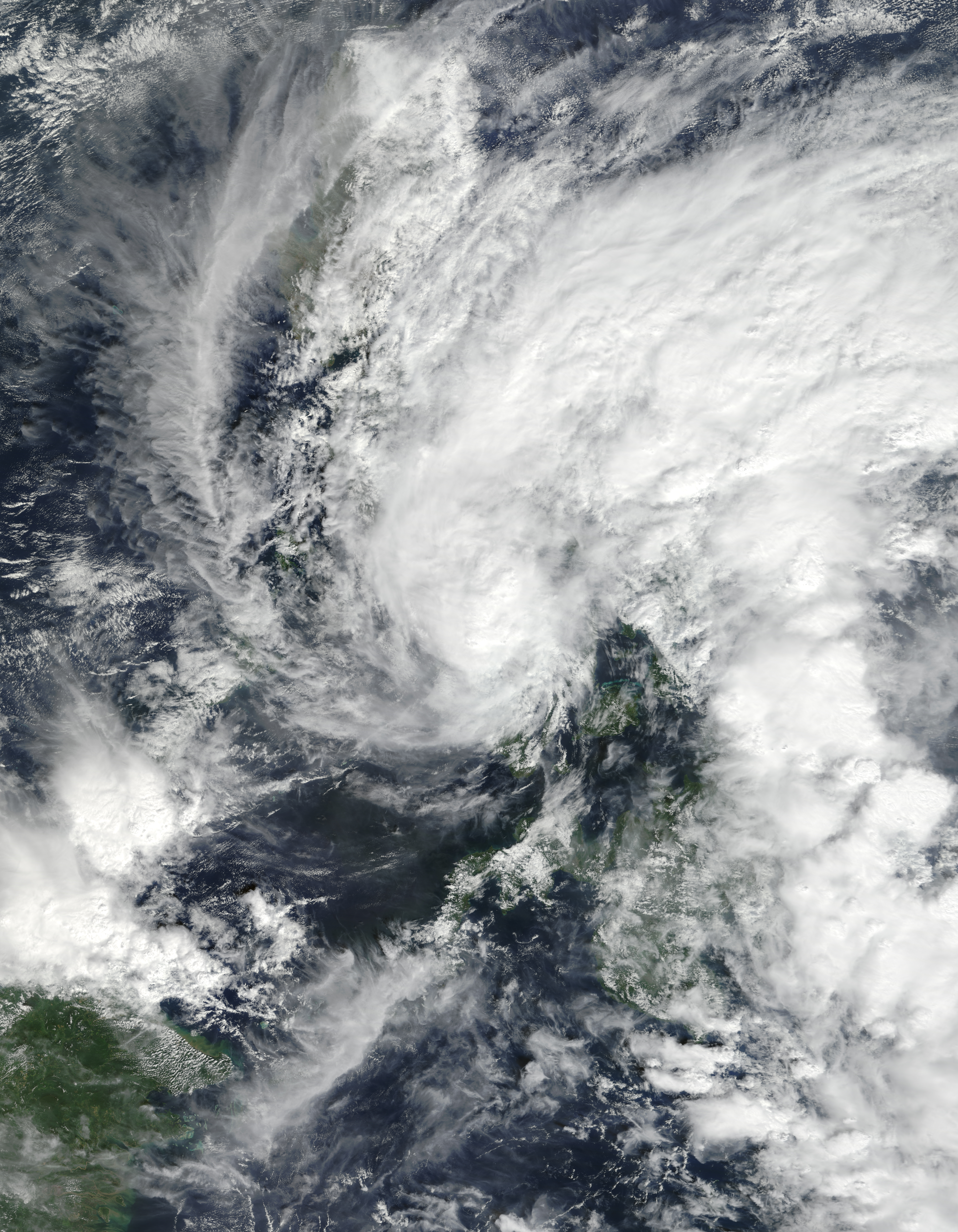
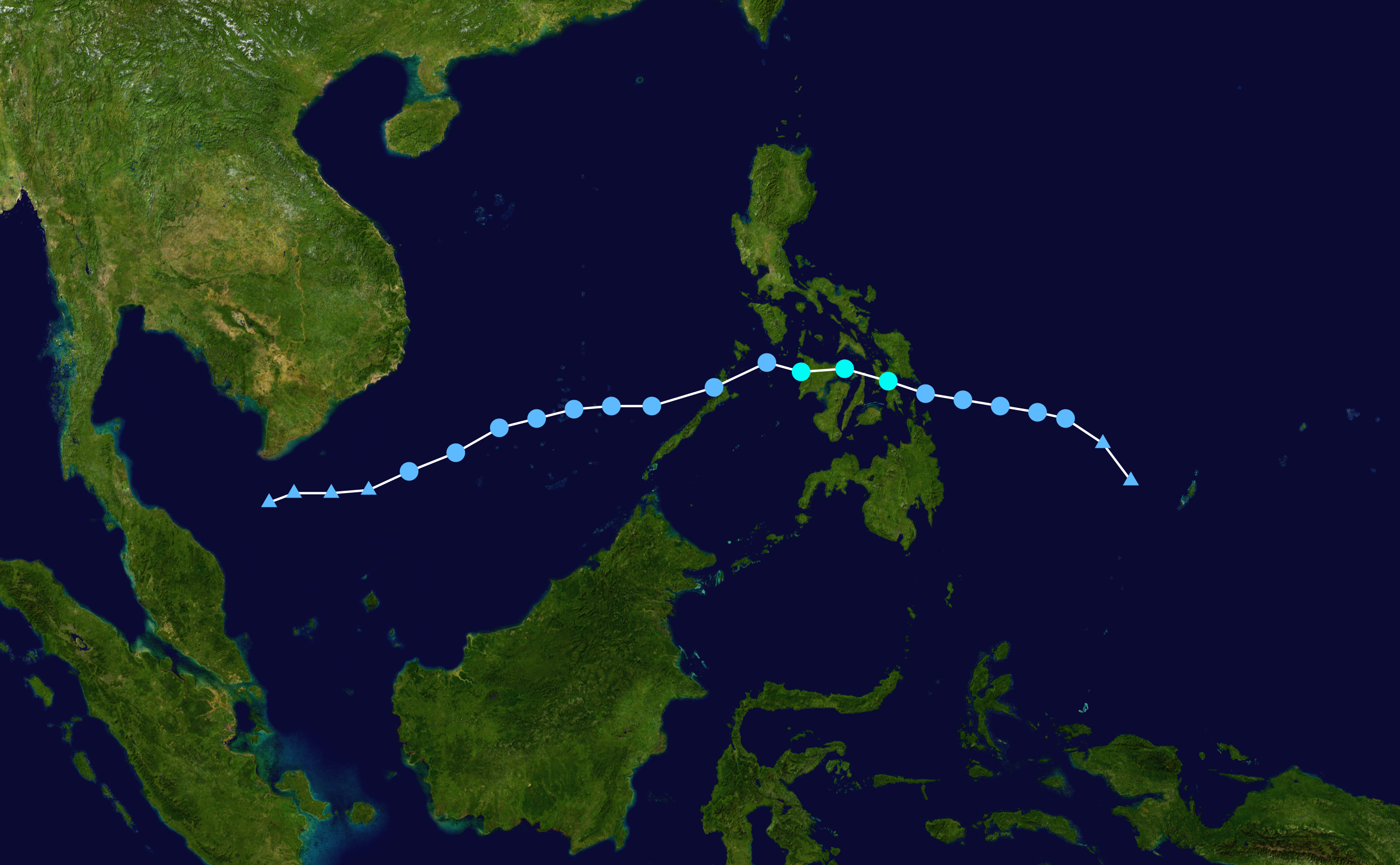
- Duration: December 24 – December 29
- Peak intensity: 75 km/h (45 mph) (10-min); 1000 hPa (mbar)

Early on December 24, the JMA reported that a tropical depression had developed within a trough of low pressure, about 220 km (135 mi) to the north-east of Palau. During that day the depressions low level circulation gradually consolidated further, as it moved towards the west-northwest along the southern edge of the subtropical ridge of high pressure. The JTWC and PAGASA subsequently initiated advisories on the system with the latter naming it Quinta. Early on Christmas Day 2012, the JMA reported that the depression had become a tropical storm and named it as Wukong, before reporting that the system had attained its peak 10-minute sustained windspeeds of 75 km/h (45 mph). Later that day, the system passed over or close to several of the Visayan Islands, before the JTWC reported that the system had reached its peak 1-minute sustained windspeeds of 65 km/h (35 mph).

During December 26, Wukong continued to move through the Philippine islands, before the JTWC reported that the system had become a tropical depression, after its low level circulation center became fully exposed within an area of moderate to strong vertical windshear. However, throughout December 27, as the system moved through the South China Sea and deep convection redeveloped over the systems center, the JMA continued to report that Wukong was a tropical storm. During the next day, the JMA reported that the system had weakened into a tropical depression, before the JTWC issued their final warning on Wukong as a north-easterly cold surge along the coast of south-east Asia had caused the depression to become fully exposed. The depression subsequently was last noted during the next day by both the JTWC and the JMA, dissipating about 190 km (120 mi) to the south of Vietnam.

Within the Philippines, 23 people were killed, while 4 others were left missing.

=== Other systems ===
On April 8, the JMA started to monitor a tropical depression, that had developed about 2,000 km (1,245 mi) to the northeast of Tarawa island in Kiribati. Over the next few days the JMA continued to monitor the depression, before it was last noted by the JMA during April 11 about 450 km (280 mi) to the northwest of Wake Island. Late on April 28, the JMA reported that a tropical depression had developed about 460 km (285 mi) to the southeast of Davao City on the Philippine island of Mindanao. Over the next day, the depression moved towards the west-northwest, before it was last noted early on April 30, as it dissipated near Mindanao.

On August 5, the Central Pacific Hurricane Center started to monitor a TUTT cell that had developed into a subtropical low, while located about 400 km (250 mi) to the southeast of Midway Atoll. Over the next few days the low moved westwards towards the Western Pacific, before it moved into the basin during August 7. As it continued to move towards the west the JMA reported on August 9, that the low had developed into a tropical depression. The system re-entered the Central Pacific Ocean early on August 11. On August 23, the JMA reported that a tropical depression had developed about 441 km (275 mi) to the northeast of Shanghai in China. Over the next few days, the depression moved northwards, before it was last noted by the JMA during August 25 moving into North Korea. During September 10, the JMA started to monitor a tropical depression, that had developed in an area of moderate vertical windshear between two upper tropospheric trough cells about 945 km (585 mi) to the southeast of Tokyo, Japan. During that day the depression remained near stationary, before it started during September 11 to move northwards as it directly interacted with another area of low pressure, located about 405 km (250 mi) to the northwest of the depression. Over the next couple of days, as the depression moved towards the northwest, the system transitioned into a subtropical cyclone, before it was last noted by the JMA during September 13.

== Storm names ==
Within the North-western Pacific Ocean, both the Japan Meteorological Agency (JMA) and the Philippine Atmospheric, Geophysical and Astronomical Services Administration assign names to tropical cyclones that develop in the Western Pacific, which can result in a tropical cyclone having two names. The Japan Meteorological Agency's RSMC Tokyo — Typhoon Center assigns international names to tropical cyclones on behalf of the World Meteorological Organization's Typhoon Committee, should they be judged to have 10-minute sustained windspeeds of 65 km/h, (40 mph). While the Philippine Atmospheric, Geophysical and Astronomical Services Administration assigns names to tropical cyclones which move into or form as a tropical depression in their area of responsibility located between 135°E and 115°E and between 5°N-25°N even if the cyclone has had an international name assigned to it. The names of significant tropical cyclones are retired, by both PAGASA and the Typhoon Committee. Should the list of names for the Philippine region be exhausted then names will be taken from an auxiliary list of which the first ten are published each season. Unused names are marked in gray.

=== International names ===
During the season 25 tropical storms developed in the Western Pacific and each one was named by the JMA, when the system was judged to have 10-minute sustained windspeeds of 65 km/h (40 mph). The JMA selected the names from a list of 140 names, that had been developed by the 14 members nations and territories of the ESCAP/WMO Typhoon Committee. During the season the names Pakhar, Doksuri, Haikui, Sanba, Maliksi and Son-Tinh were used for the first time, after they had replaced the names Matsa, Nabi, Longwang, Chanchu, Bilis and Saomai, which were retired after the 2005 and 2006 seasons.

Pakhar	Sanvu	Mawar	Guchol	Talim	Doksuri	Khanun	Vicente	Saola	Damrey	Haikui	Kirogi	Kai-tak
Tembin	Bolaven	Sanba	Jelawat	Ewiniar	Maliksi	Gaemi	Prapiroon	Maria	Son-Tinh	Bopha	Wukong	

==== Retirement ====
After the season the Typhoon Committee retired the names Vicente and Bopha from its naming lists, and in 2014 and 2015, the names were subsequently replaced with Lan and Ampil for future seasons.

=== Philippines ===
Ambo	Butchoy	Carina	Dindo	Enteng
Ferdie	Gener	Helen	Igme	Julian
Karen	Lawin	Marce	Nina	Ofel
Pablo	Quinta	Rolly (unused)	Siony (unused)	Tonyo (unused)
Ulysses (unused)	Vicky (unused)	Warren (unused)	Yoyong (unused)	Zosimo (unused)
Auxiliary list
Alakdan (unused)	Baldo (unused)	Clara (unused)	Dencio (unused)	Estong (unused)
Felipe (unused)	Gardo (unused)	Heling (unused)	Ismael (unused)	Julio (unused)

During the season PAGASA used its own naming scheme for the 17 tropical cyclones, that either developed within or moved into their self-defined area of responsibility. The names were taken from a list of names, that had been last used during 2008 and were used again during 2016. All of the names are the same except for the names Carina and Ferdie, which replaced Cosme and Frank, respectively. Both names were used for the first time this year.

==== Retirement ====
After the season, the name Pablo was retired by PAGASA due to the damages and deaths caused by the storm and was replaced by Pepito.

== Season effects ==
This table lists all the storms that developed in the western Pacific Ocean to the west of the International Date Line during the 2012 season. It includes their intensity, duration, name, areas affected deaths, and damages. All damage figures are in 2012 USD. Damages and deaths from a storm include when the storm was a precursor wave, or an extratropical low.

Name	Dates	Peak intensity			Areas affected	Damage (USD)	Deaths	Ref(s).
Name	Dates	Category	Wind speed	Pressure	Areas affected	Damage (USD)	Deaths	Ref(s).
TD	January 13–14	Tropical depression	Not specified	1006 hPa (29.71 inHg)	Malaysia	None	None	
01W	February 17–21	Tropical depression	55 km/h (35 mph)	1004 hPa (29.65 inHg)	Philippines	$1 million	2	
TD	March 24	Tropical depression	Not specified	1008 hPa (29.77 inHg)	Philippines	None	None	
Pakhar	March 26 – April 2	Tropical storm	75 km/h (45 mph)	998 hPa (29.47 inHg)	Philippines, Vietnam, Cambodia, Thailand	$53.9 million	15	
TD	April 8–11	Tropical depression	55 km/h (35 mph)	1004 hPa (29.65 inHg)	None	None	None	
TD	April 28–30	Tropical depression	Not specified	1008 hPa (29.77 inHg)	Palau, Philippines	None	None	
Sanvu	May 20–27	Severe tropical storm	110 km/h (70 mph)	975 hPa (28.79 inHg)	Guam, Marina Islands	$20,000	None	
Mawar (Ambo)	May 31 – June 6	Strong typhoon	140 km/h (85 mph)	960 hPa (28.35 inHg)	Philippines, Japan	Minimal	3	
Guchol (Butchoy)	June 10–20	Very strong typhoon	185 km/h (115 mph)	930 hPa (27.46 inHg)	Caroline Islands, Philippines, Japan	$100 million	2	
Talim (Carina)	June 16–21	Severe tropical storm	95 km/h (60 mph)	985 hPa (29.09 inHg)	China, Taiwan	$356 million	1	
Doksuri (Dindo)	June 25–30	Tropical storm	75 km/h (45 mph)	992 hPa (29.29 inHg)	Philippines, Taiwan, China	$418,000	None	
Khanun (Enteng)	July 14–19	Severe tropical storm	95 km/h (60 mph)	985 hPa (29.09 inHg)	Japan, Korea	$11.4 million	89	
Vicente (Ferdie)	July 18–25	Strong typhoon	150 km/h (90 mph)	950 hPa (28.05 inHg)	Philippines, China, Vietnam, Laos, Burma	$351 million	32	
Saola (Gener)	July 26 – August 4	Strong typhoon	130 km/h (80 mph)	960 hPa (28.35 inHg)	Philippines, Taiwan, Japan, China	$2.73 billion	85	
Damrey	July 27 – August 4	Strong typhoon	130 km/h (80 mph)	965 hPa (28.50 inHg)	Japan, China, South Korea	$4.55 billion	48	
Haikui	August 1–11	Strong typhoon	130 km/h (75 mph)	965 hPa (28.50 inHg)	Japan, Philippines, China	$5.91 billion	118	
Kirogi	August 3–10	Severe tropical storm	95 km/h (60 mph)	990 hPa (29.23 inHg)	Japan	None	None	
TD	August 9–11	Tropical depression	Not specified	1008 hPa (29.77 inHg)	None	None	None	
Kai-tak (Helen)	August 12–18	Strong typhoon	120 km/h (75 mph)	970 hPa (28.64 inHg)	Philippines, China, Vietnam, Laos	$765 million	41	
Tembin (Igme)	August 17–30	Strong typhoon	150 km/h (100 mph)	950 hPa (28.05 inHg)	Philippines, Taiwan, China, Japan, South Korea	$6.67 million	10	
Bolaven (Julian)	August 19–29	Very strong typhoon	185 km/h (115 mph)	910 hPa (26.87 inHg)	China, Japan, Korea, Siberia	$3.77 billion	96	
TD	August 23–24	Tropical depression	Not specified	1008 hPa (29.77 inHg)	Korean Peninsula	None	None	
Sanba (Karen)	September 10–18	Violent typhoon	205 km/h (125 mph)	900 hPa (26.58 inHg)	Palau, Japan, Korea, China, Siberia	$362 million	6	
TD	September 10–13	Tropical depression	55 km/h (35 mph)	1006 hPa (29.71 inHg)	Japan	None	None	
Jelawat (Lawin)	September 20 – October 1	Violent typhoon	205 km/h (125 mph)	905 hPa (26.72 inHg)	Philippines, Taiwan, Japan	$115 million	2	
Ewiniar	September 23–30	Severe tropical storm	95 km/h (60 mph)	985 hPa (29.09 inHg)	Mariana Islands, Japan	None	None	
Maliksi	September 29 – October 4	Severe tropical storm	95 km/h (60 mph)	985 hPa (29.09 inHg)	Guam, Marina Islands, Japan	None	None	
Gaemi (Marce)	September 29 – October 7	Severe tropical storm	95 km/h (60 mph)	990 hPa (29.23 inHg)	Philippines, Vietnam, Cambodia, Thailand	$4.1 million	6	
Prapiroon (Nina)	October 5–19	Very strong typhoon	165 km/h (105 mph)	940 hPa (27.76 inHg)	Japan	None	1	
Maria	October 13–20	Severe tropical storm	95 km/h (60 mph)	990 hPa (29.23 inHg)	Mariana Islands, Japan	None	None	
Son-Tinh (Ofel)	October 21–30	Very strong typhoon	155 km/h (100 mph)	945 hPa (27.91 inHg)	Palau, Philippines, China, Vietnam	$776 million	42	
25W	November 12–15	Tropical depression	55 km/h (35 mph)	1004 hPa (29.65 inHg)	Malaysia, Vietnam	None	None	
Bopha (Pablo)	November 25 – December 9	Very strong typhoon	185 km/h (115 mph)	930 hPa (27.46 inHg)	Caroline Islands, Palau, Philippines	$1.16 billion	1,901	
Wukong (Quinta)	December 24–29	Tropical storm	75 km/h (45 mph)	998 hPa (29.47 inHg)	Philippines, Vietnam	$16.9 million	23	
Season aggregates
34 systems	January 13 – December 29, 2012		205 km/h (125 mph)	900 hPa (26.58 inHg)		$21 billion	2,523	

== See also ==
- Tropical cyclones in 2012
- List of Pacific typhoon seasons
- 2012 Pacific hurricane season
- 2012 Atlantic hurricane season
- 2012 North Indian Ocean cyclone season
- South-West Indian Ocean cyclone seasons: 2011–12, 2012–13
- Australian region cyclone seasons: 2011–12, 2012–13
- South Pacific cyclone seasons: 2011–12, 2012–13
- 2012 China floods
