= Typhoons in the Korean Peninsula =

Tropical cyclones in the Korean peninsula

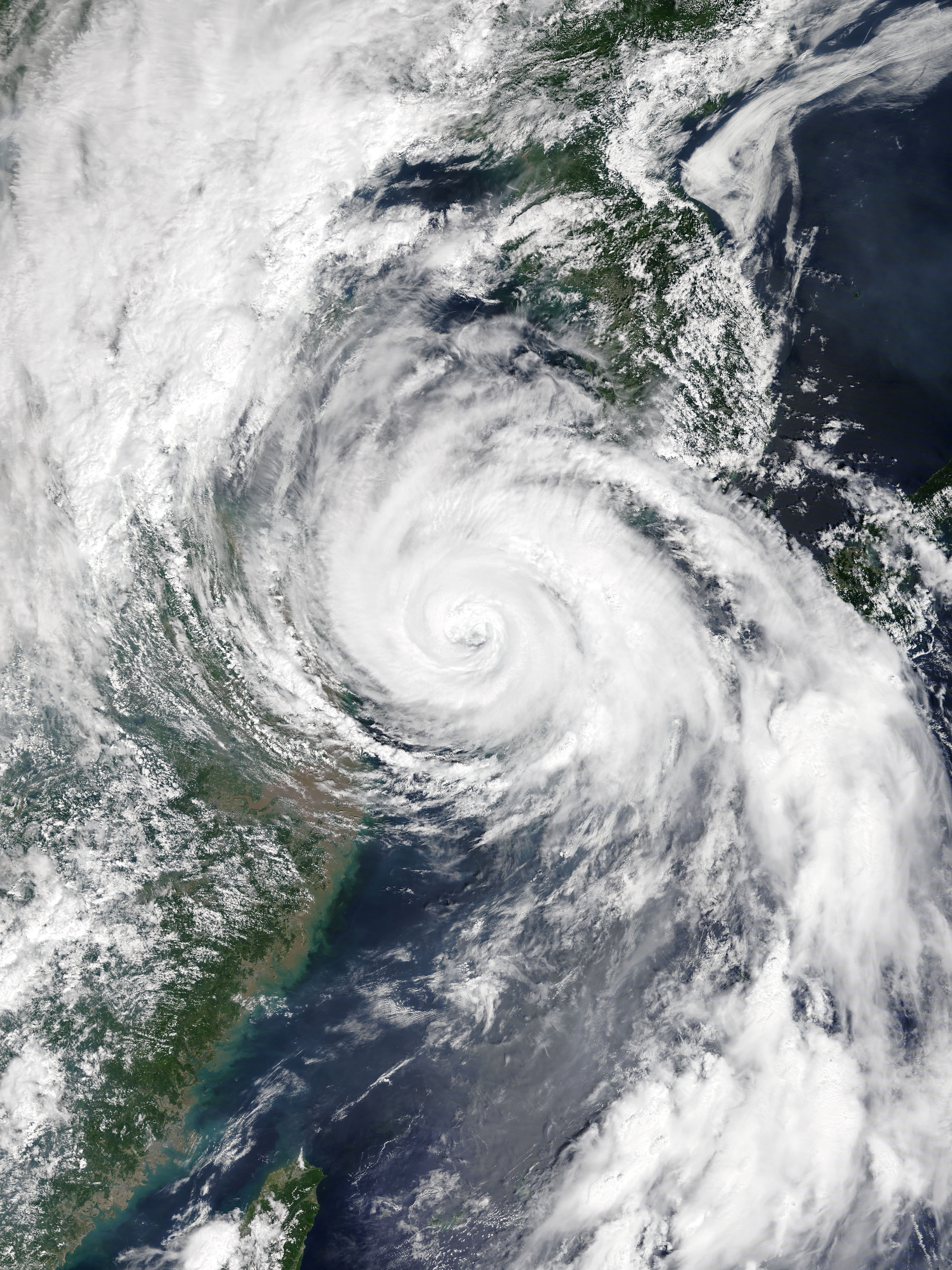
Typhoon Bavi approaching South Korea as a Category 3 typhoon in August 2020

The Korean Peninsula is a peninsula region located over Eastern Asia. Politically, the region is divided into the Democratic People's Republic of Korea (North Korea) and the Republic of Korea (South Korea).

Climatologically, in the Northwest Pacific basin, most tropical cyclones tend to develop between May and October. Typhoons impacting this region are not uncommon, with the bulk of these storms doing so in the third quarter (July to September). This article includes any tropical cyclone of any intensity that affected the Korean Peninsula.

== 20th century ==
=== Pre-1980s ===
- August 28, 1936 – a typhoon struck South Korea, killing 1,104 people.
- July 10, 1939 – a typhoon struck the western coast of North Korea.
- July 12, 1940 – local newspapers reported a typhoon that struck the city of Seoul, killing 52 people.
- July 23, 1940 – a typhoon moved across much of the Korean Peninsula.
- August 4, 1945 – Tropical Storm Eva moved northwards affecting much of peninsula before dissipating.
- August 19–20, 1946 – as a weakening storm, Tropical Storm Lilly made landfall over South Korea and affected much of the peninsula.

=== 1980s ===
- August 28, 1986 ― Typhoon Vera made landfall near the Kunsan Air Base in South Korea. Nationwide, a total of 1,852 structures were damaged, which resulted in over 6,000 people being homeless.
- July 15, 1987 ― Typhoon Thelma struck South Korea and moved northward. Rainfall across the nation varied, but peaked at 270 mm (11 in) in Kangnung. In all, 123 people died from the typhoon.
- August 2–3, 1987 ― Tropical Depression Alex moved over North Korea. The storm deluged the country with up to 300 mm (12 in) of rainfall in a single day.
- August 30–31, 1987 ― Typhoon Dinah neared the southeastern coast of South Korea without making landfall, however the typhoon brought strong winds and rainfall, with a peak rainfall total of 300 mm (11.8 in) being measured in South Chungcheong Province. 33 people died from the typhoon.
- July 28–29, 1989 ― Tropical Storm Judy made landfall to the west of Busan. Heavy rains from the storm exacerbated ongoing floods, leading to at least 20 fatalities.
- September 17, 1989 ― The remnant low of Tropical Storm Vera passed by the Korean Peninsula.

=== 1990s ===
- July 12, 1990 ― Tropical Storm Robyn passed by the southern coast of South Korea before dissipating.

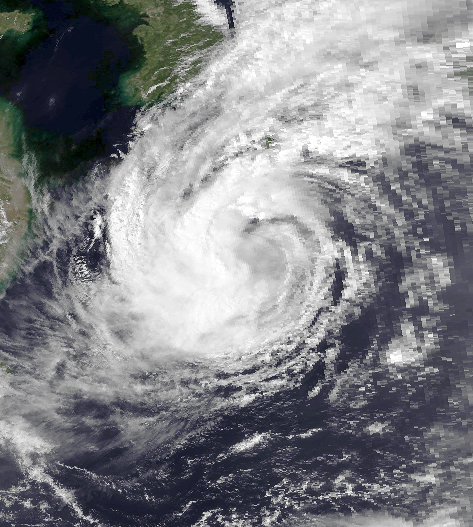
Tropical Storm Gladys in August 1991; it is the seventh deadliest storm to hit the region

- September 1, 1990 ― Tropical Storm Abe brought heavy rain and gale-force winds to South Korea prior to transitioning to an extratropical cyclone near the east coast of the peninsula.
- July 29–30, 1991 ― Typhoon Caitlin, while nearing the region, had typhoon warnings across much of South Korea. Caitlin triggered torrential rainfall that only killed two people.
- August 22–23, 1991 ― Tropical Storm Gladys passed by South Korea bringing heavy rainfall. During a 24-hour period in Ulsan, 420 mm (16.4 in) of rain fell, the most ever recorded on record. 90 people died from the storm.
- September 27, 1991 ― The outer rain bands of Typhoon Mireille, the costliest typhoon at the time (and the costliest typhoon on record, if inflation is taken into account), brought rainfall and rough seas in South Korea, which killed two people.
- September 24, 1992 ― Tropical Storm Ted made landfall over the western portion of South Korea before transitioning into an extratropical cyclone.
- August 10, 1993 ― Typhoon Robyn brought rough seas up to 6.1 to 10.7 m (20 to 35 ft) along the southeastern coast of South Korea. Roughly 45 people were killed by the typhoon.
- July 27, 1994 ― Tropical Depression Walt neared the southern coast of South Korea and Jeju Island. It is said that rainfall across the country helped improve severe drought conditions.
- July 31–August 1, 1994 ― Tropical Storm Brendan traversed the central part of the Korean Peninsula, also reliving drought conditions at that time.
- August 9–10, 1994 ― Tropical Storm Doug neared the southwestern coast of South Korea, bringing gusty winds of about 64 mph (103 km/h).
- October 11, 1994 ― Typhoon Seth battered most of South Korea with gusty winds of heavy rainfall.
- July 23–24, 1995 ― Typhoon Faye impacted the Korean Peninsula as a moderate typhoon. Rough waves in Pusan Harbor resulted in two ships colliding.
- August 26, 1995 ― Tropical Storm Janis made landfall near Seoul and affects most of the region with mostly heavy rainfall.
- August 8–9, 1997 ― Typhoon Tina closed by Jeju Island, but also impacts South Korea.
- September 28–30, 1998 ― Typhoon Yanni brought a tremendous amount of rainfall that killed 50 people.
- July 27–28, 1999 ― Tropical Storm Neil affected South Korea. There were wind gusts of up to 95 km/h (60 mph) on Cheju Island and the peak rainfall reported from the storm was over 200 mm (8 inches). As the storm dissipated over Korea, it caused flash floods that killed at least seven and left 7,000 homeless.
- August 3, 1999 ― Typhoon Olga impacted the Korean Peninsula. 106 people have been killed due to torrential rainfall that led to landslides, along with strong winds.
- September 19, 1999 ― Tropical Storm Ann brought moderate rain of up to 100 mm (4 inches) to Anhui, Jiangsu and Shandong on September 18.
- September 22–23, 1999 ― Typhoon Bart and its outflow brought rainfall over South Korea.

== 21st century ==
=== 2000s ===
- July 10, 2000 ― The remnant low of Typhoon Kai-tak neared and affected North Korea by bringing light to moderate rainfall.
- July 31, 2000 ― Tropical Storm Bolaven affected Busan, South Korea by bringing heavy rainfall.
- August 26–27, 2000 ― The weakening remnant system of Typhoon Bilis caused torrential precipitation across South Korea. At Kunsan Air Base, 468 mm (18.42 in) of rain was recorded over a 48-hour period; this two-day total was over three times the August average for the location.
- September 1, 2000 ― Typhoon Prapiroon made landfall over North Korea and kills roughly 65 people.

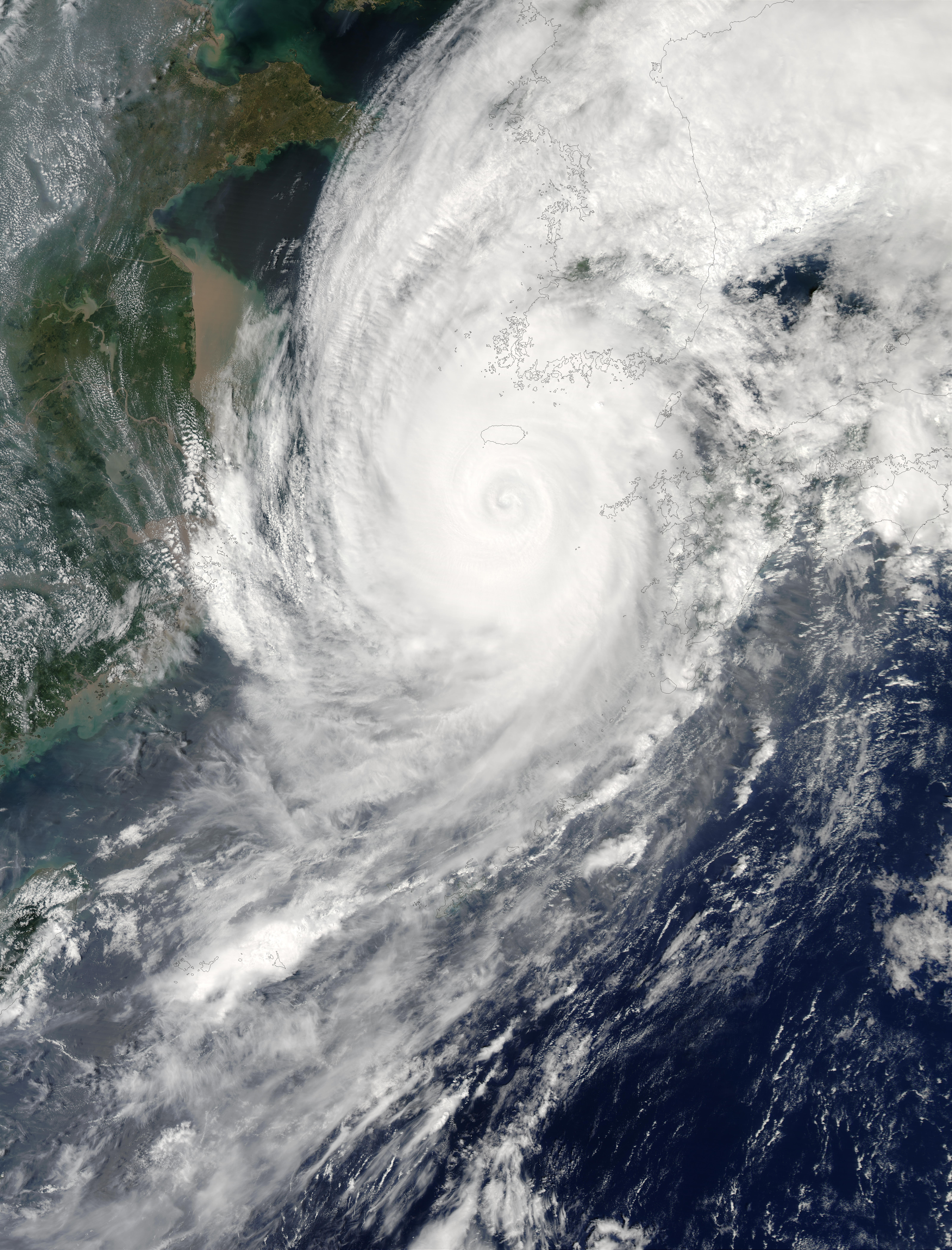
Typhoon Maemi nearing South Korea on September 12, 2003

- September 13–16, 2000 ― Typhoon Saomai brought heavy rainfall and strong winds that caused power outages to 422,000 homes.
- July 6–8, 2002 ― Tropical Storm Rammasun passed a short distance to the west of Jeju Island before making landfall near the Seoul Metropolitan Area. The storm dropped more than 300 mm (12 in) of rainfall.
- July 27, 2002 ― Tropical Storm Fengshen passed just close off Jeju Island.
- August 31, 2002 ― Typhoon Rusa made landfall over Goheung, South Korea. It was the most powerful typhoon to strike the country in 43 years. 233 people died there, with an extra three from North Korea.
- June 19, 2003 ― Typhoon Soudelor dropped about 500 mm (20 in) of rainfall at Hallasan in Jeju Province in South Korea. The storm also caused 4 m (13 ft) seas.
- September 11–12, 2003 ― Typhoon Maemi impacted Korea as a strong typhoon. It was one of the most powerful typhoons to strike South Korea. 117 people had died from the typhoon.
- July 4, 2004 ― The extratropical remnants of Typhoon Mindulle affected the peninsula bringing rainfall and strong winds.
- August 17–19, 2004 ― Typhoon Megi brought heavy rainfall over South Korea. The heaviest 24‑hour rain total was 332.5 mm in Wando.
- September 6–7, 2004 ― The outskirts of Typhoon Songda dropped heavy rainfall in South Korea, with a peak 24‑hour total of 112 mm (4.4 in) on the offshore island of Ulleungdo. On the mainland, Pohang recorded 110.5 mm (4.35 in) of rainfall over 24 hours.
- August 8, 2005 ― The remnants of Typhoon Matsa produced moderate amounts of rainfall reaching 229 mm (9.0 in) in Masan.
- September 6–7, 2005 ― Typhoon Nabi neared the eastern portion of South Korea, bringing record rainfall in Ulsan and Pohang. The periphery of the storm produced gusts of 121 km/h (75 mph) in the port city of Busan.
- May 19, 2006 ― The trough that engulfed the remnant low of Chanchu drew moisture from the typhoon, leading to heavy rainfall in portions of South Korea that reached 144 mm (5.7 in) on Jeju Island. Along with strong winds, the rains caused ferry and flight cancelations.
- July 9–10, 2006 ― Typhoon Ewiniar hits the Korean Peninsula. Severe flooding and several landslides occurred. Damages throughout the country amounted to ₩2.06 trillion (US$1.4 billion), while there had been roughly 203 people who have been killed - with most coming from North Korea.
- August 18–20, 2006 ― Tropical Storm Wukong brushed the eastern coast of South Korea, producing heavy rainfall.
- September 17–18, 2007 ― Typhoon Shanshan and its outer outflow brought heavy rainfall over southeastern Korea. Busan had reported 60 mm (2 inches) of rainfall at that time.
- September 16–17, 2007 ― Typhoon Nari made landfall over South Korea, bringing torrential rainfall. The hardest hit area was Jeju Island, where rainfall amounted to a record 590 mm (23.2 in). 20 people were killed. Jeju Island was declared a national disaster area by the South Korean government.
- September 20–21, 2007 ― The remnant low of Typhoon Wipha affected the Korean Peninsula, with most of its effects seen in North Korea, where their flooding has worsened. A total of 1,649 people were left homeless following the storm.
- July 22, 2008 ― The remnants of Typhoon Kalmaegi produced heavy rains over the Korean Peninsula, peaking at 237.5 mm (9.3 in) in Seoul. Heavy flooding killed four people.
- August 12, 2009 ― The remnants of Typhoon Morakot brought rainfall over the Korean Peninsula.

=== 2010s ===
- August 11, 2010 ― Tropical Storm Dianmu made landfall over the southern coast of South Korea. Heavy rainfall was mostly experienced.
- September 1, 2010 ― Typhoon Kompasu struck the Seoul Metropolitan Area as a Category 1 typhoon. Heavy rainfall and gusty winds were experienced, which caused widespread traffic delays in Seoul.
- September 6–8, 2010 ― Tropical Storm Malou neared the southeastern coast of South Korea.
- September 11, 2010 ― The extratropical remnants of Tropical Storm Meranti passed by South Korea.
- June 26, 2011 ― Tropical Storm Meari neared the southwestern coast of the peninsula. Heavy rainfall and rough seas were seen. The storm contributed in bringing rainfall that occurred for six consecutive days in Seoul.
- August 7–8, 2011 ― Typhoon Muifa battered the western portion of the region. The storm's fierce winds led to cancellation of several flights, power outages and fallen trees.
- July 19, 2012 ― Tropical Storm Khanun impacted the peninsula, dumping heavy precipitation. Heavy flooding was experienced due to some dams discharging water. Losses across the country were at ₩1.5 billion (US$11.4 million).
- August 1, 2012 ― Typhoon Damrey passed just to the south of Jeju Island.
- August 28–29, 2012 ― Typhoon Bolaven brought wind gusts of up to 186 km/h (116 mph) in some areas. North Korea received a total of 59 deaths.
- August 30, 2012 ― Tropical Storm Tembin made landfall over South Jeolla Province. Some areas received up to 150 mm (5.9 in) of rain, leading to several landslides.
- September 16–18, 2012 ― Typhoon Sanba impacted the Korean Peninsula as a strong typhoon. Numerous structures along rivers were damaged or destroyed by flooding. Across the nation, four people were killed and the damage from the typhoon reached ₩365.7 billion (US$328 million).
- August 29–30, 2013 ― The outer rain bands of Tropical Storm Kong-rey brought light rainfall over Jeju.
- October 8–9, 2013 ― Typhoon Danas neared South Korea bringing gusty winds. Damages in Jeju Island were at ₩245 million (US$228,000).
- July 9, 2014 ― Typhoon Neoguri affected Jeju Island with the closing of some schools parks.
- July 26, 2014 ― The remnant low of Typhoon Matmo brought rainfall over Seoul, South Korea.
- August 1–4, 2014 ― Tropical Storm Nakri brought record-breaking rainfall over the southern provinces of South Korea. Gusty winds were experienced in Jeju.
- September 25, 2014 ― The extratropical low of Tropical Storm Fung-wong brushed the southern coast of South Korea.
- July 12–13, 2015 ― A weakened Tropical Storm Chan-hom hit Ongjin Peninsula in North Korea. Jeju Island recorded precipitation of 1,250 mm (49 in).
- July 26, 2015 ― Before its dissipation, Tropical Depression Halola neared Busan, where gusty winds of 93 km/h (58 mph) was recorded in Chinhae Naval Base.

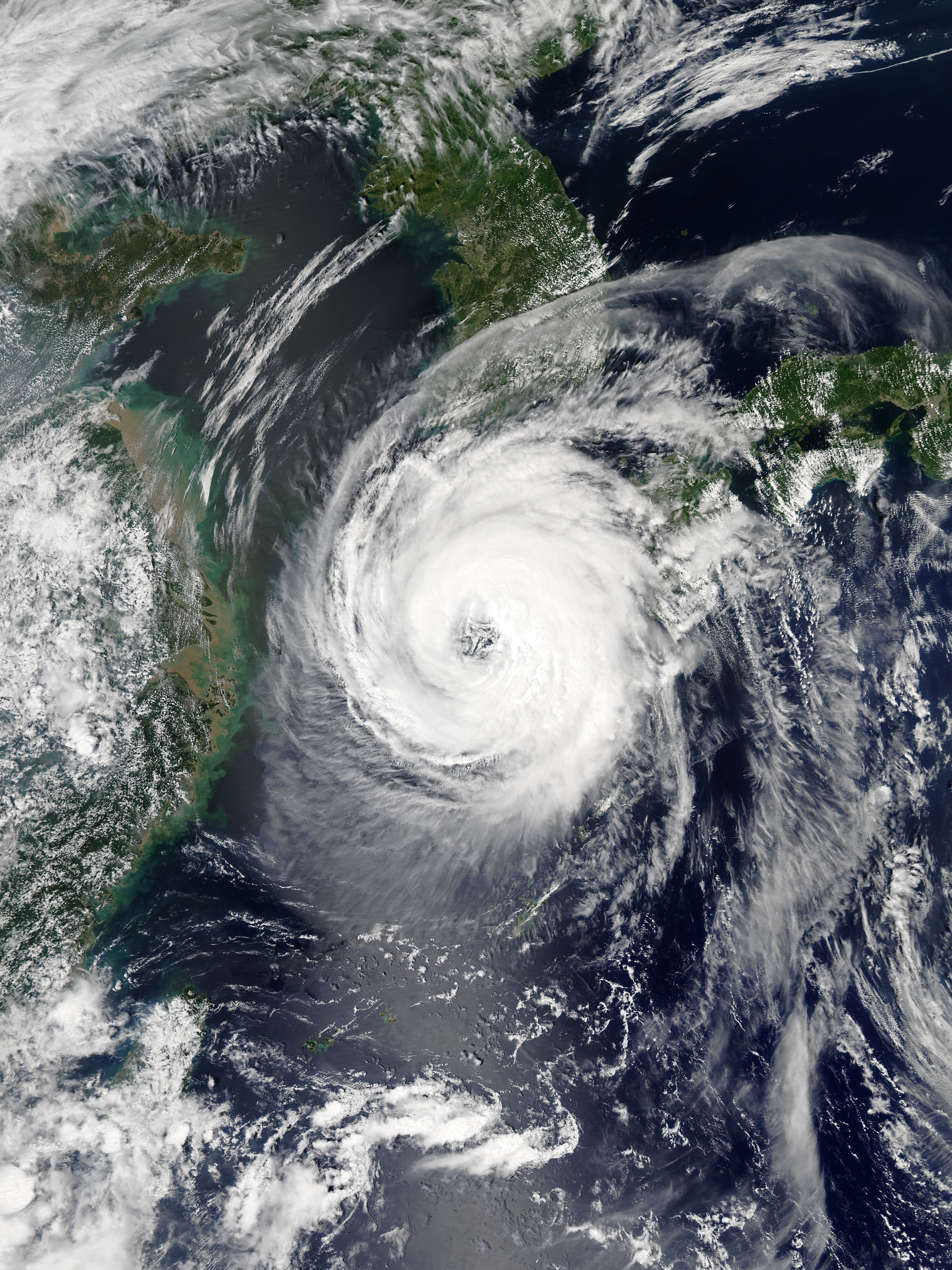
Typhoon Soulik approaching Korea on August 22, 2018

- August 11, 2015 ― The extratropical remnants of Typhoon Soudelor brought locally heavy rain to parts of South Korea, with accumulations reaching 25 to 60 mm (0.98 to 2.4 in).
- August 24–25, 2015 ― Typhoon Goni brought heavy rainfall throughout most of South Korea and North Korea. Flooding in North Korea killed 40 people.
- August 31 – September 15, 2016 – The remnants of Typhoon Lionrock hit North Korea, causing widespread flooding that led to the deaths of at least 525 people. This made Lionrock the deadliest typhoon to strike the Korean Peninsula since Typhoon Sarah 57 years prior.
- October 7, 2016 ― Typhoon Chaba impacted South Korea with rainfall. Ulsan and Busan experienced flooding, while Jeju Island established a new rainfall rate.
- August 15, 2018 ― The remnant low of Tropical Depression Leepi affected the southeastern portion of South Korea.
- August 23–24, 2018 ― Typhoon Soulik battered the Korean Peninsula. 86 people were killed by the typhoon.
- October 5–6, 2018 ― Typhoon Kong-rey made landfall in Tongyeong City, Gyeongsangnam-do. Busan and Jeju experienced the worst effects, suffering from severe flooding and power outages.
- July 19–21, 2019 ― Tropical Storm Danas made landfall over North Jeolla Province, South Korea. Stormy conditions were in place in most of South Korea.
- August 6–7, 2019 ― Typhoon Francisco neared the eastern coast of the peninsula, producing rainfall the most along the east coast, peaking at 190 mm (7.5 in) at Seoraksan.
- September 7, 2019 – Typhoon Lingling hit the western coast of North Korea. Power outages were seen in many areas and damages in the region were toppled to ₩28.76 billion (US$24.1 million).
- September 21, 2019 ― A weakening Tropical Storm Tapah neared Jeju Island and southeastern South Korea bringing gusty winds. Damage in South Korea were at ₩2.96 billion (US$2.48 million).
- October 2–3, 2019 ― Tropical Storm Mitag traversed South Korea, bringing heavy rainfall and gusty winds.

=== 2020s ===
- August 5–6, 2020 ― The extratropical low of the former Typhoon Hagupit dumped heavy rainfall towards the Korean Peninsula. Up to 5.7 inches (145 mm) of rain was reported in the South Korean city of Suwon. A landslide there killed six people.
- August 10, 2020 ― Tropical Storm Jangmi made landfall over the Gyeongsang Province of South Korea. The storm dropped up to 2.6 inches (66.04 mm) of precipitation, in an area already hard hit by flooding in the months previous to Jangmi.
- August 26–27, 2020 ― Typhoon Bavi caused widespread structural damage and flooding over North Korea. Five people were swept away from rough seas in Jeju Island.
- September 3, 2020 ― Typhoon Maysak struck the Gyeongsang Province, bringing torrential rainfall and gusty winds.
- September 7, 2020 ― The last of three consecutive typhoons to hit the region, Typhoon Haishen brought widespread flooding and gusty winds. Total damage along with Typhoon Maysak were calculated at ₩606.3 billion (US$510 million).
- August 24, 2021 – Tropical Depression Omais brushed the southern provinces of South Korea, bringing heavy downpour which caused minor effects.
- September 6, 2022 - Typhoon Hinnamnor made landfall over Geoje, South Gyeongsang Province, South Korea.
- August 10, 2023 - Typhoon Khanun made landfall over Geoje, South Gyeongsang Province, South Korea. It is also the first typhoon to go from south to north of the peninsula.

== Climatology ==
Storms Affecting the Korean Peninsula by month
Month	Number of Storms
May	1
June	2
July	23
August	33
September	24
October	5

== Deadly storms ==
The following list are the ten most deadly storms that impacted the Korean Peninsula. Total number of deaths recorded are only from the country itself.

Rank	Name	Year	Number of Deaths
1	"1936 Korea typhoon"	1936	1,516
2	Sarah	1959	669
3	Lionrock	2016	525
4	Rusa	2002	236
5	Ewiniar	2006	203
6	Thelma	1987	123
7	Maemi	2003	117
8	Olga	1999	106
9	Gladys	1991	90
10	Khanun	2012	89

== See also ==
- Typhoon
- 2026 Pacific typhoon season
