= Typhoon Chaba (2016) =

Pacific typhoon in 2016

Typhoon Chaba (Igme)
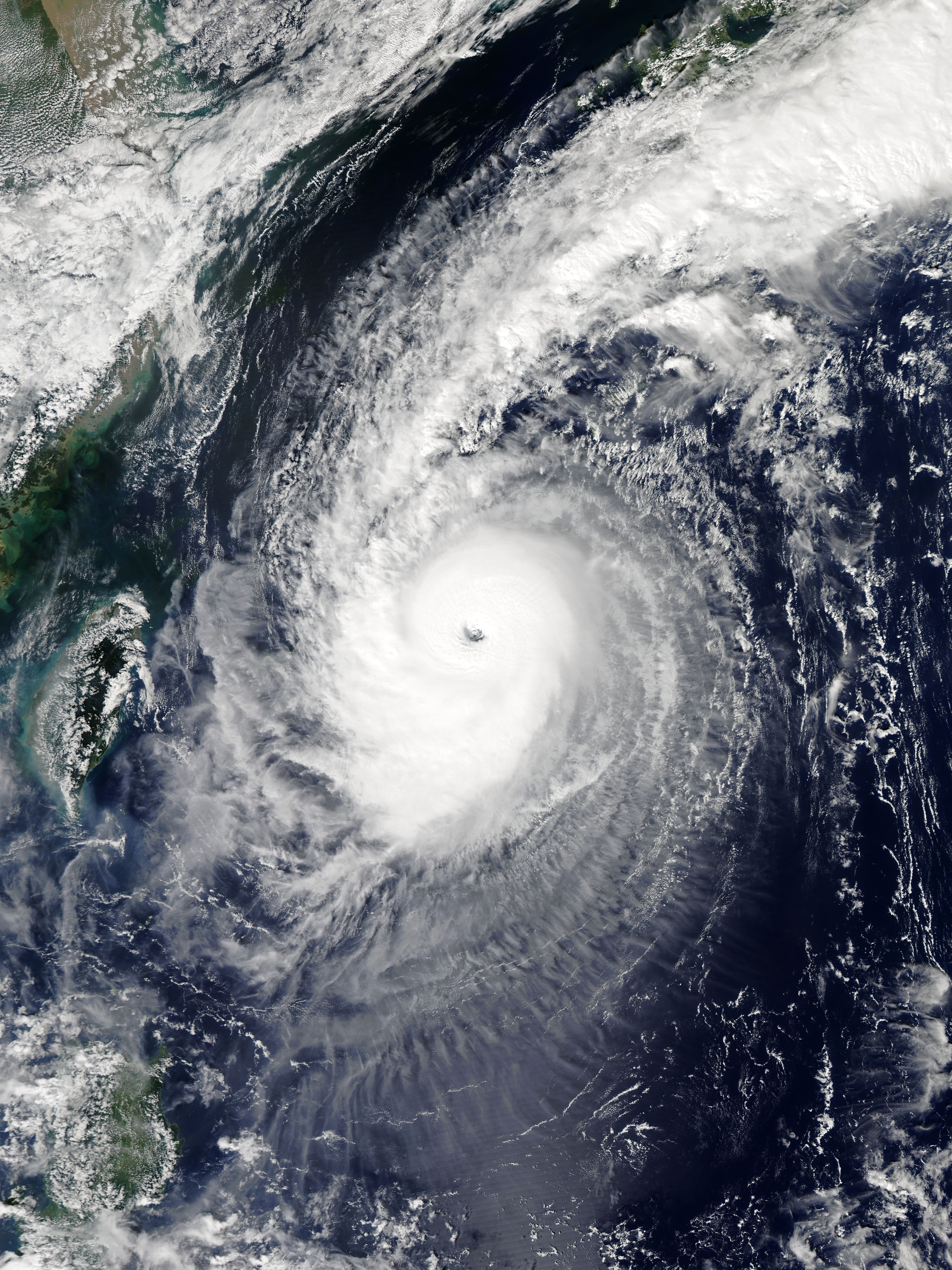
- Typhoon Chaba at peak intensity near Okinawa on October 3

Meteorological history
- Formed: September 24, 2016
- Dissipated: October 7, 2016

Violent typhoon
- 10-minute sustained (JMA)
- Highest winds: 215 km/h (130 mph)
- Lowest pressure: 905 hPa (mbar); 26.72 inHg

Category 5-equivalent super typhoon
- 1-minute sustained (SSHWS/JTWC)
- Highest winds: 280 km/h (175 mph)
- Lowest pressure: 911 hPa (mbar); 26.90 inHg

Overall effects
- Fatalities: 10 total
- Damage: $129 million
- Areas affected: Mariana Islands, South Korea, Japan, Russian Far East
- IBTrACS
- Part of the 2016 Pacific typhoon season

Typhoon Chaba, (Note: The name Chaba (Thai: ชบา, [t͡ɕʰa˦˥ baː˧]) was contributed by Thailand and refers to the Chinese hibiscus (Hibiscus rosa-sinensis) in Thai.) known in the Philippines as Super Typhoon Igme, was the fourth most intense tropical cyclone in 2016 and the strongest tropical cyclone to make landfall in South Korea since Sanba in 2012. Chaba also caused 7 deaths in the country. Typhoon Chaba was the eighteenth named storm and the eighth typhoon of the 2016 Pacific typhoon season. Chaba originated as a depression around the east-northeast of Guam. Being in a marginally favorable environment, JMA proceeds to name the system as Chaba. On September 28, JTWC gave its identifier as Tropical Depression 21W. Its LLCC starts to improve, prompting the JTWC to upgrade into a tropical storm. Chaba entered the Philippine Area of Responsibility, receiving the name Igme as it moved northwestwards. Chaba became more symmetrical which later ensued its rapid intensification.

Chaba later reached its peak intensity as a Category 5-equivalent super typhoon. Shortly after this, Chaba began to weaken as it moved over the Yellow Sea on October 4. At 10:00 a.m. KST (01:00 UTC), Chaba made landfall in Busan as a weakening Category 1-equivalent typhoon. Shortly after landfall, it transitioned into an extratropical cyclone which prompted the JMA to issue its final advisory.

== Meteorological history ==
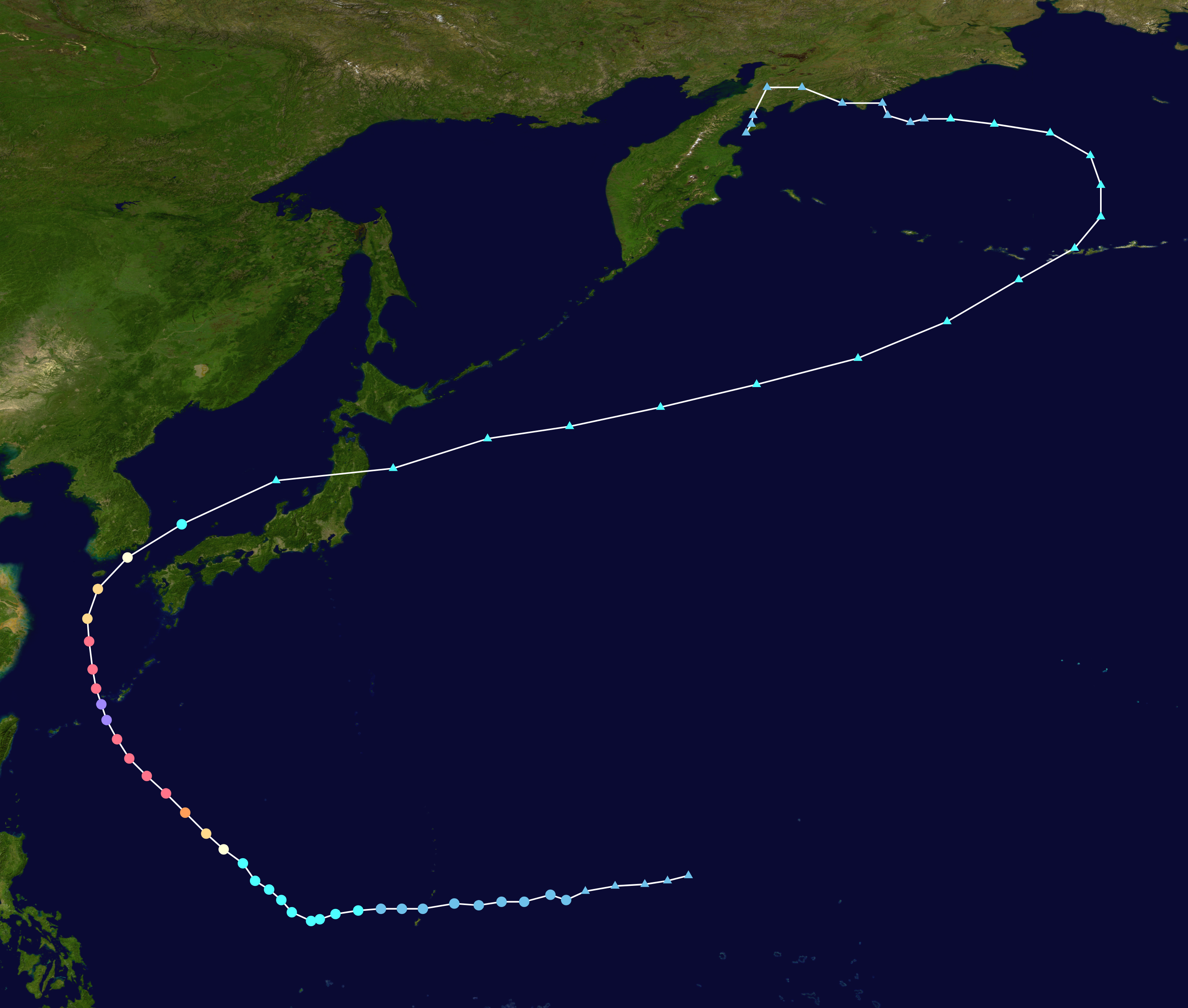
Map plotting the storm's track and intensity, according to the Saffir–Simpson scale Map key Saffir–Simpson scale Tropical depression (≤38 mph, ≤62 km/h) Tropical storm (39–73 mph, 63–118 km/h) Category 1 (74–95 mph, 119–153 km/h) Category 2 (96–110 mph, 154–177 km/h) Category 3 (111–129 mph, 178–208 km/h) Category 4 (130–156 mph, 209–251 km/h) Category 5 (≥157 mph, ≥252 km/h) Unknown Storm type Tropical cyclone Subtropical cyclone Extratropical cyclone, remnant low, tropical disturbance, or monsoon depression

On September 26, a tropical depression developed approximately 1,445 km (898 mi) east-northeast of Guam. Despite a marginally favorable environment, the Japan Meteorological Agency (JMA) upgraded the system to a tropical storm and assigned it the name Chaba late the next day. Early on September 28, the Joint Typhoon Warning Center (JTWC) gave the identifier of 21W. Flaring convection and improved overall convective structure prompted the JTWC to upgrade it to a tropical storm. By September 30, Chaba had intensified into a severe tropical storm after deep convection had evolved into a banding feature and very favorable conditions such as very low wind shear and sea surface temperatures (SSTs) of about 30 degrees Celsius. On October 1, Chaba entered the Philippine area of responsibility, with PAGASA assigning the local name Igme, as it started to move in a northwestward direction. Several hours later, both agencies upgraded Chaba to a typhoon after its organization and structure had vastly improved. During the next day, Chaba became more symmetric as feeder bands wrapped into its deep central convection, signalling the onset of explosive intensification.

Continuing its strengthening trend, Chaba reached Category 5 super typhoon intensity with a sharp 5 nmi (9.3 km; 5.8 mi) wide eye surrounded by a very intense convective core due to very warm SSTs. On October 3, Chaba reached its peak intensity with 10-minute sustained winds of 215 km/h (130 mph), 1-minute sustained winds of 280 km/h (175 mph), and a minimum central pressure of 905 mbar. Thereafter, the JTWC stated that Chaba began weakening, as its core became asymmetric, and Chaba weakened to a strong Category 4 typhoon by October 4. Later, significant weakening led the JTWC to downgrade Chaba further to a Category 2 typhoon, due to interaction with strong north-northeasterly winds. At 10:00 a.m. KST (01:00 UTC), Chaba struck Geojedo and then made landfall in Busan an hour later with winds of 120 km/h (75 mph). At that time, Chaba started to undergo extratropical transition and the JTWC issued its final advisory a few hours later, while downgrading the system to a tropical storm. At the same time, the JMA downgraded Chaba to a severe tropical storm. Six hours later, the JMA issued its final advisory, as Chaba became extratropical.

== Preparations and impact ==
EVA Air and China Airlines canceled flights to Okinawa that had been scheduled for 3 October, which was the day the typhoon was forecast to impact Okinawa. EVA Air had previously been criticized for operating flights to destinations affected by typhoons a week earlier, when Typhoon Megi was affecting the region.

The storm left widespread damage across the southern regions of South Korea, killing at least 7 and leaving 3 missing. Transportation was disrupted, with hundreds of flights canceled, while more than 220,000 households lost electricity. Chaba was the strongest typhoon to strike the country since Sanba in 2012, and was the strongest October typhoon to hit Korea, establishing a new record for rainfall rate on Jeju Island. Flooding was also reported in the southern South Korea cities of Ulsan, Gyeongju, and Busan. Damages were reported at ₩143.3 billion (US$129 million).

== See also ==
- Weather of 2016
- Tropical cyclones in 2016
- Typhoon Emma (1956) – which took a similar track to Sarah.
- Typhoon Sarah (1959) – one of the deadliest typhoons on record.
- Typhoon Maemi (2003) – the most powerful typhoon to strike South Korea since record-keeping in 1904
- Typhoon Sanba (2012) – a powerful and damaging typhoon that made landfall over South Korea in September 2012
- Typhoon Hinnamnor (2022) – a much more damaging typhoon that impacted South Korea in September 2022.
