= Typhoon Hinnamnor =

Pacific typhoon in 2022

Typhoon Hinnamnor (Henry)
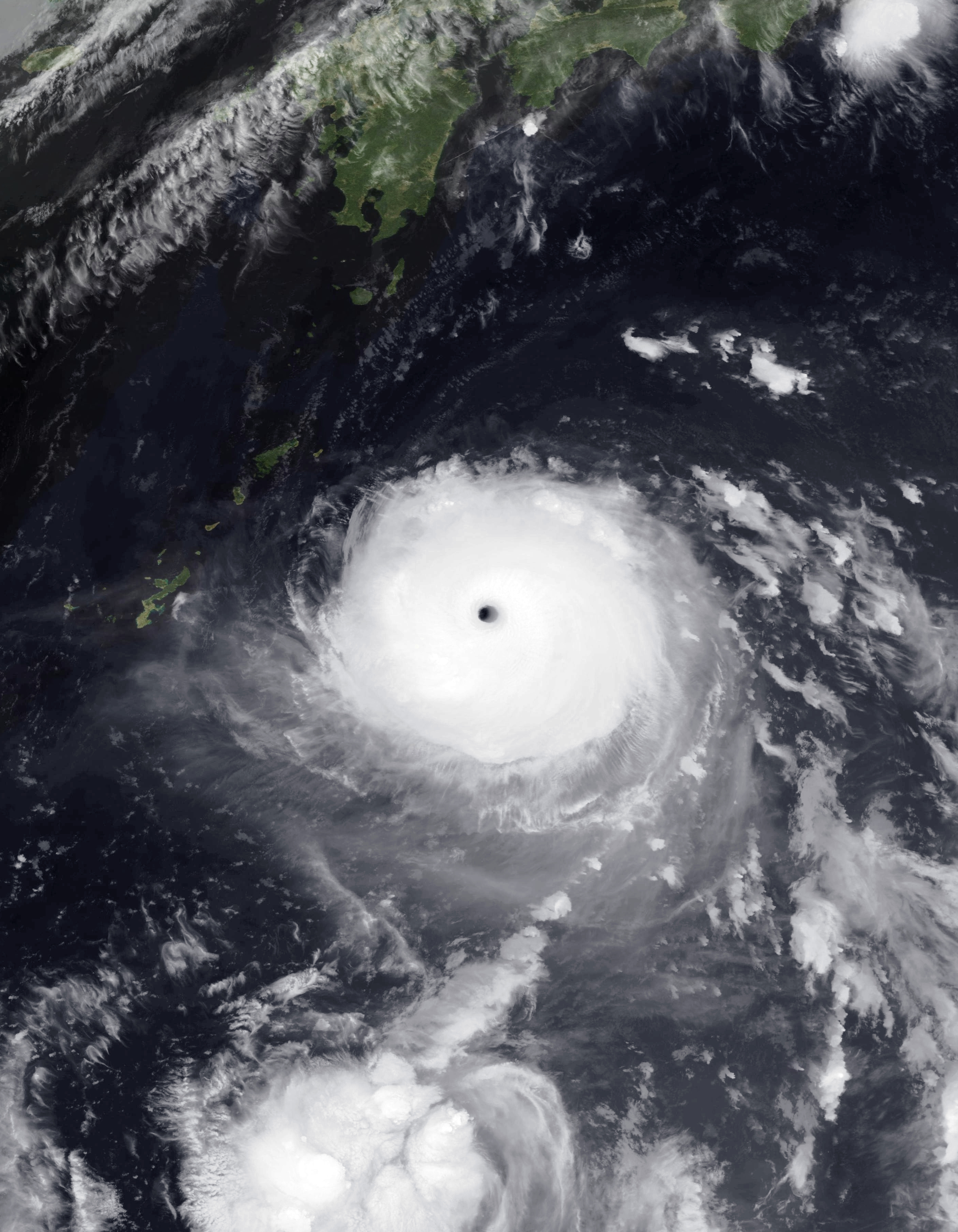
- Hinnamnor at its initial peak intensity while approaching Okinawa on August 30.

Meteorological history
- Formed: August 27, 2022
- Extratropical: September 6, 2022
- Dissipated: September 9, 2022

Violent typhoon
- 10-minute sustained (JMA)
- Highest winds: 195 km/h (120 mph)
- Lowest pressure: 920 hPa (mbar); 27.17 inHg

Category 5-equivalent super typhoon
- 1-minute sustained (SSHWS/JTWC)
- Highest winds: 270 km/h (165 mph)
- Lowest pressure: 911 hPa (mbar); 26.90 inHg

Overall effects
- Fatalities: 20
- Missing: 1
- Damage: $1.81 billion (2022 USD)
- Areas affected: Japan; Taiwan; Philippines; South Korea; Russian Far East
- IBTrACS
- Part of the 2022 Pacific typhoon season

Typhoon Hinnamnor, (Note: The name Hinnamnor (Lao: ຫີນໜາມໜໍ່, [hiːn˩ naːm˩ nɔː˧]) was contributed by Laos and refers to Hin Namno National Park in Lao.) known in the Philippines as Super Typhoon Henry, was a very large and powerful tropical cyclone that impacted Japan, South Korea, Taiwan, the Philippines, and Russia in early September 2022. The eleventh named storm, fourth typhoon, and the 1st super typhoon of the 2022 Pacific typhoon season, Hinnamnor originated from a disturbed area of weather first noted on August 27 by the JTWC. This area soon formed into Tropical Storm Hinnamnor on the next day. The storm rapidly intensified and became a typhoon on the August 29. Overnight, Hinnamnor cleared a small eye along with a well-defined CDO, and intensified into a high-end Category 4-equivalent super typhoon.

Hinnamnor then weakened due to undergoing an eyewall replacement cycle. However, it re-intensified to a Category 5 super typhoon, the first of 2022, with a larger eye and CDO south of Okinawa. An increasingly hostile environment caused it to lose its convective features the night of September 1, weakening it down to a Category 1-equivalent typhoon. As the storm accelerated northward into the East China Sea, it rebuilt itself throughout the next day, and began intensifying again. The storm gained major status once again on September 4, and headed northeastwards towards Busan. Beginning to weaken for the final time on September 5, the storm made landfall late that day as a Category 2-equivalent typhoon and began extratropical transition.

As Hinnamnor approached, many advisories concerning the storm were issued in Japan, China, Taiwan, and South Korea. The typhoon brought flooding rainfall and powerful winds to Okinawa, and thousands of homes suffered power outages. Heavy rainfall affected northern districts in Taiwan, and a man died in the Philippines due to Hinnamnor's flooding. Hinnamnor made landfall just southeast of Geoje in South Korea, knocking out power for tens of thousands of homes. Overall, the typhoon was responsible for 20 deaths, 1 missing and US$1.81 billion in damage across several countries.

== Meteorological history ==
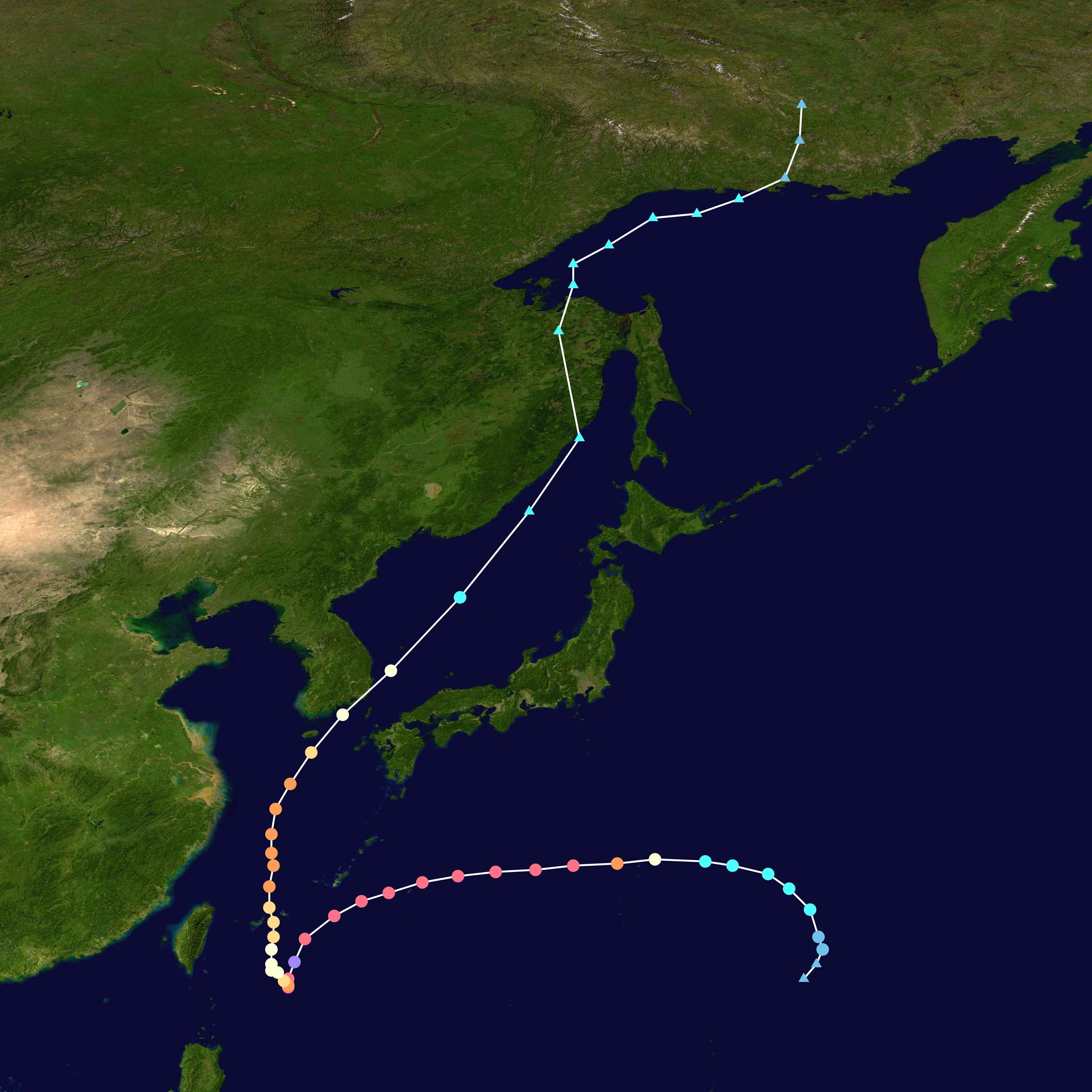
Map plotting the storm's track and intensity, according to the Saffir–Simpson scale Map key Saffir–Simpson scale Tropical depression (≤38 mph, ≤62 km/h) Tropical storm (39–73 mph, 63–118 km/h) Category 1 (74–95 mph, 119–153 km/h) Category 2 (96–110 mph, 154–177 km/h) Category 3 (111–129 mph, 178–208 km/h) Category 4 (130–156 mph, 209–251 km/h) Category 5 (≥157 mph, ≥252 km/h) Unknown Storm type Tropical cyclone Subtropical cyclone Extratropical cyclone, remnant low, tropical disturbance, or monsoon depression

On August 27, the Joint Typhoon Warning Center (JTWC) (Note: The Joint Typhoon Warning Center is a joint United States Navy – United States Air Force task force that issues tropical cyclone warnings for the western Pacific Ocean and other regions.) began monitoring a tropical disturbance about 500 nautical miles (925 km; 575 mi) east-southeast of Iwo Jima. Satellite images indicated that the north and southeast areas were accompanied by deep convection wrapping into the low-level center. At around 00:00 UTC on August 28, the Japan Meteorological Agency (JMA) (Note: The Japan Meteorological Agency is the official Regional Specialized Meteorological Center for the western Pacific Ocean.) began monitoring a tropical depression that had developed in the Philippine Sea. Later at 04:00 UTC the same day, the JTWC issued a Tropical Cyclone Formation Alert (TCFA) for Invest 90W. Beginning to rapidly intensify over warm waters, weak vertical wind shear, and high ocean heat content, the JMA and the JTWC upgraded the system to a tropical storm, with the JMA assigning the name Hinnamnor for the system. A central dense overcast feature and prominent spiral banding, noting its obscure low-level circulation center. Hinnamnor continued to organize and intensified into a severe tropical storm early the next day. Hinnamnor strengthened into a typhoon, making it the fourth typhoon of the season.

At 09:00 UTC, the JTWC upgraded Hinnamnor to a Category 1-equivalent typhoon, with maximum sustained winds of 75 knots (140 km/h; 85 mph). Microwave imaging revealed a small, well-defined microwave eye feature. Rapid intensification occurred on Hinnamnor, and it intensified into a Category 3-equivalent typhoon. Quickly strengthening, the storm quickly grew with Category 4-equivalent winds of 125 knots (230 km/h; 145 mph); however, there was some curved banding in the 8 nautical miles (15 km; 9.2 mi) diameter eye. At around 15:00 UTC on August 30, the JTWC classified Hinnamnor as a super typhoon. Overnight, Hinnamnor cleared out a small, round eye, and strengthened into a high-end category 4-equivalent super typhoon. At this time, the JTWC estimated winds of 135 knots (250 km/h; 155 mph), with the JMA estimating a minimum central pressure of 920 hPa (27.17 inHg).

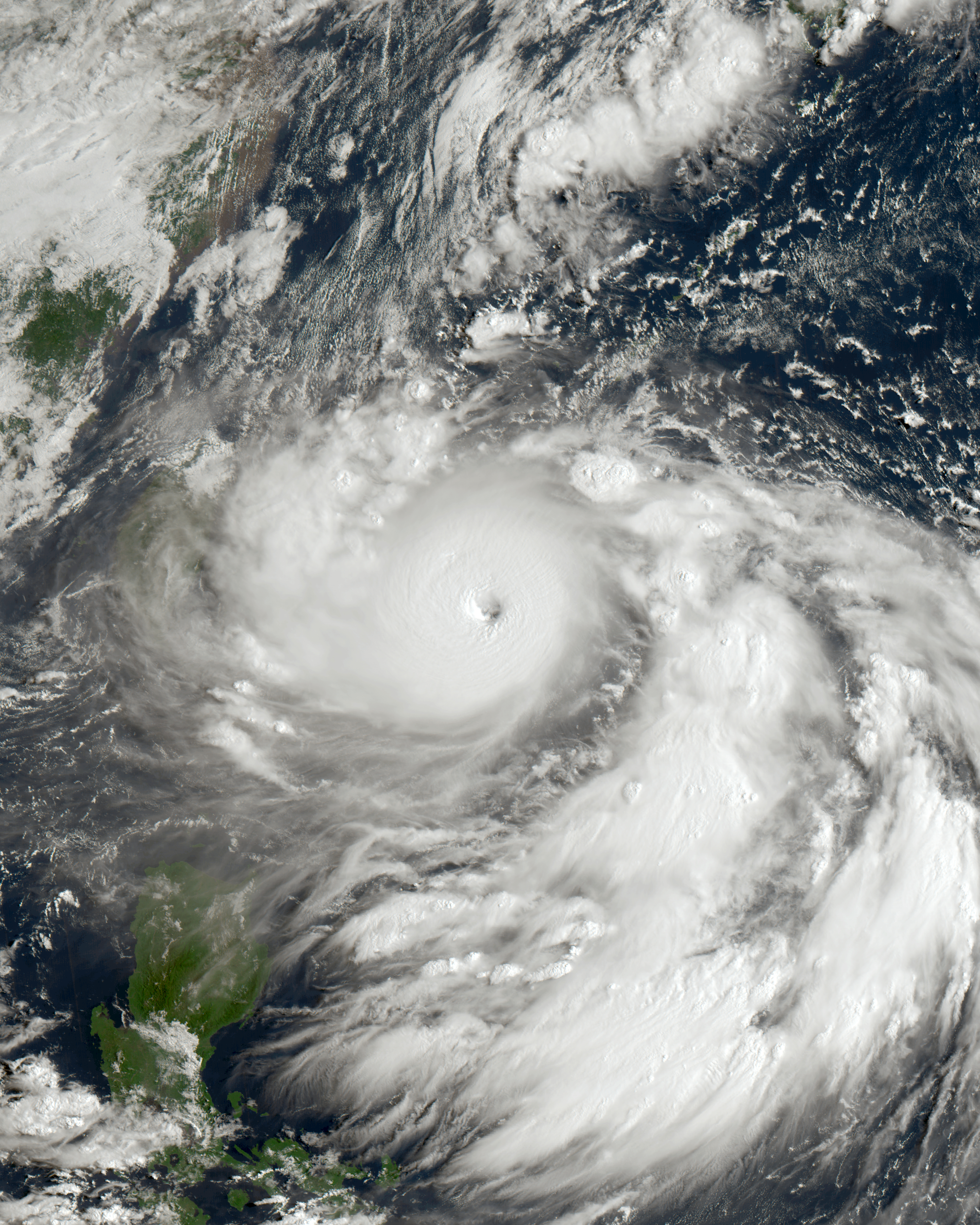
Typhoon Hinnamnor as a Category 5-equivalent super typhoon on September 1 at 00:00 UTC

Hinnamnor weakened back to a Category 4-equivalent typhoon after beginning an eyewall replacement cycle. Hinnamnor entered the Philippine Area of Responsibility, and was named Henry on August 31. As it headed towards the Ryukyu Islands, Hinnamnor proceeded to reorganize on satellite with an intense CDO forming along with a larger eye. It re-intensified back to a Category 5-equivalent super typhoon on September 1, and, at the same time, Tropical Depression 13W (Gardo) embedded into the wind field with Hinnamnor. Hinnamnor weakened to Category 4-equivalent super typhoon by 09:00 UTC due to elongation of the convective core and cooler sea surface temperatures. Due to northeasterly vertical wind shear, Hinnamnor weakened again to Category 4-equivalent typhoon. Hinnamnor's winds were estimated at just 95 knots (175 km/h; 110 mph), which made it a Category 2-equivalent typhoon on September 2. At 09:00 UTC, Hinnamnor further weakened into a Category 1-equivalent typhoon as it finally began to move north-northwest into the East China Sea. It rebuilt its convective features, and was upgraded to a Category 2-equivalent typhoon once more on September 3. Hinnamnor later crossed the Southern Ryukyu Islands. Hinnamor then exited the PAR at 01:30 PHT September 4 (17:30 UTC September 3), and the PAGASA issued their final bulletin for the system at 05:00 PHT (21:00 UTC September 3) on the same day.

The system re-strengthened again to Category 3-equivalent typhoon as it strengthened, with deep convection becoming more symmetric on September 4. Multispectral animated satellite imagery revealed a 10 nautical miles (19 km; 12 mi) surrounded eye around a spiral banding. Hinnamnor continued to be persistent despite dry air intrusion from the west. Its eye slowly became cloud-filled as its circulation wrapped around it. At 21:00 UTC on September 5, the JTWC further downgraded it to a Category 2-equivalent typhoon. According to the Korea Meteorological Administration (KMA), Hinnamnor made landfall just southeast of Geoje, South Gyeongsang Province, South Korea. At 03:00 UTC the next day, the JTWC issued their final warning on the system as it began its transition into an extratropical cyclone, with its frontal structure. Shortly after, the JMA downgraded Hinnamnor to a severe tropical storm. The JMA issued its last advisory on Hinnamnor, and declared it an extratropical low. The low moved northward and was last noted in Okhotsk, Russia on September 7.

== Preparations ==
=== Japan ===
An official at the JMA called for "strict vigilance" against Hinnamnor, and recommended those move to sturdy buildings and shelters as the typhoon approached. He also stated that winds from the storm could reach into other portions of Kyushu. Flooding rains of over 400 mm (16 in) were also forecasted for the islands of Sakishima. Several maritime trips were also cancelled due to the typhoon's approach. 174 flights, and 228 ferry trips were cancelled. The harvest season in the Hokuriku region of the country was anticipated to be impacted too. Several COVID-19 vaccine drives were cancelled for the September 3 and 4. Over 100,000 total people were ordered to evacuate in Okinawa by local authorities.

=== South Korea ===
South Korean President Yoon Suk-yeol ordered Interior Minister Lee Sang-Min to come up with the highest response measures for Hinnamnor. A meeting was then held concerning response to Hinnamnor by Lee. The storm was forecasted to be as strong at landfall as 2003's Maemi. Preliminary weather advisories were issued in southern areas of the country, including the cities of Gwangju, Busan, Daegu, and Ulsan on the September 4. Prime Minister Han Duck-soo called for schools to close down or switch to distance education until on September 5. Run rates of three reactors at Kori Nuclear Power Plant were lowered to less than 30% in anticipation of Hinnamnor. 200 residents in coastal areas of Busan were asked to evacuate to shelters. 7,600 civil servants were deployed in Busan to help with emergency response.

=== Elsewhere ===
In Taiwan, the Central Weather Bureau issued warnings as Hinnamnor approached on September 2. Eight flights, two domestic and six international, and 106 ferry services on 12 routes were cancelled, as well as school closures in several districts. In the Philippines, Signals No. 1 and 2 were issued in northern Luzon as Hinnamnor passed. Governor Marilou Cayco suspended classes in Batanes. The Philippine Airlines cancelled flights due to inclement weather. The Philippine National Police (PNP) deployed disaster response units in northern Luzon.

In eastern China, coastal cities suspended ferry services and classes. Shanghai deployed more than 50,000 officers to aid with rescues and traffic. The nations Meteorological Center issued a yellow typhoon warning on September 4. In North Korea, officials inspected buildings at risk of flooding, and boats were recalled to their port. Pyongyang took measures to protect certain areas frequently hit by mudslides.

== Impact ==
=== Japan ===
Four people in Okinawa were injured as a result of the Typhoon. According to Okinawa Electric Power Company, 2,920 houses were out of power in Miyakojima, another 190 were out in Ishigaki, 330 in Tarama, and 10 in Taketomi Town. on September 3. In Watanagi Village, rainfall of up to 64 mm (2.5 in) per hour fell; the highest of such observation during the month in the past decade. Houses were damaged, with one totally destroyed in Kito-Daito Village. Agricultural damage across the prefecture reached ¥960 million (US$6.85 million).

Transportation was also affected by the Typhoon. Early in the morning on 5 September, JR West announced the possibility of a planned suspension of the Sanyo Shinkansen on September 6 with suspension between Hakata and Hiroshima being confirmed later that evening. At least 56 flights were cancelled, affecting over 3,000 people. Communication was severed from Kito-Daito as a result of Hinnamnor's passing. A mango greenhouse on Ishigaki Island was knocked down.

=== South Korea ===
Typhoon Hinnamnor making landfall on South Korea on September 6–7.

Impacts in South Korea were less than initially feared due to Hinnamnor's fast movement speed. Jeju Island recorded 273.5 mm (10.77 in) of rain from Hinnamnor's outer bands on September 4, for a later total of 948 mm (37.3 in) in parts of the island. A total of 2,661 people from 3,463 in landslide and flood-prone areas were evacuated, among the 15,000 total who were advised to. At least 66,000 houses suffered power outages, and several were reported to be inundated. One in the central city of Sejong City was destroyed. Twelve were flooded in Jeju.

Hinnamnor also left 70 vessels on 50 sea routes grounded, 251 flights at 12 airports cancelled, and 354 train schedules suspended or adjusted. Rainfall totaled 389 mm (15.3 in) in a mountainous area in the city of Gyeongju, and 272 mm (10.7) in Seoul's Gangnam District. At least 11 people were reported killed in the country. One person is missing. Rain totals in the country were 447 mm (17.6 in) in Gyeongju, 418 mm (16.5 in) in Pohang, and 385 mm (15.2 in) in Ulsan. Steelmaker POSCO reported a damage of ₩2.4 trillion (US$1.7 billion).

=== Elsewhere ===
In Taiwan, accumulated rainfall totaled 207.5 mm (8.17 in) in Yangmingshan, 177 mm (7.0 in) in Beitou District, and 174 mm (6.9 in) in Taipingshan. Local authorities in northern areas reported wind and rain damage, with no injuries. Landslides in Nanzhuang rendered roads impassable. Some 100 roadside trees fell, and over 600 residents in New Taipei, Taoyuan and Hsinchu counties were evacuated. Two major reservoirs were replenished, and the water level of the Keelung River. One of the reservoirs received 446 mm (17.6 in) of rainwater between September 1 and 4.

In the Philippines, Hinnamnor enhanced the southwest monsoon which brought rainfall over Luzon. A man died in Ifugao due to heavy rains caused by the typhoon. Hinnamnor brought heavy rains in Batanes. As of September 7, the NDRRMC reported 2,442 affected people, 51 were displaced and 192 people were preemptively evacuated. At least 12 homes were damaged or destroyed. Infrastructure damage was estimated to be ₱61.4 million (US$1.08 million).

In Russia Far East, the extratropical remnants of Hinnamnor caused flooding in Primorsky Krai. Governor Oleg Kozhemyako reported that eight people were killed. More than 2,300 houses were flooded, in which 49 of them were destroyed. About 15,000 people were affected by the flooding. Total damage in the region were amounted to ₽6 billion (US$98.7 million).

== Retirement ==
Due to the extensive damage it caused in South Korea, the Typhoon Committee announced that the name Hinnamnor, along with five others will be removed from the naming lists despite its first usage. In the spring of 2024, the name was replaced with Ong-mang. (Note: Commonly known as the Eld's Deer (Rucervus eldii) or brow-antlered deer)

== See also ==
- Weather of 2022
- Tropical cyclones in 2022
- Typhoons in the Korean Peninsula
- Typhoon Dinah (1987) – strong typhoon which had a similar track with Hinnamnor
- Typhoon Saomai (2000) – a powerful typhoon which hit the Korean Peninsula as a weaker system, but still causing widespread damage
- Typhoon Rusa (2002) – the most powerful typhoon to strike South Korea in 43 years.
- Typhoon Maemi (2003) – the strongest typhoon to impact South Korea
- Typhoon Ewiniar (2006) – a deadly typhoon that passed through South Korea.
- Typhoon Kompasu (2010) – a strong typhoon that directly affected Seoul Metropolitan Area as a moderate Category 1 typhoon.
- Typhoon Sanba (2012) – another tropical cyclone that made landfall in South Korea as a typhoon
- Typhoon Kong-rey (2018) – also had a similar track and intensity with Hinnamnor
- Typhoon Haishen (2020) – the most recent system to hit South Korea at typhoon intensity; also took a similar path
- Typhoon Khanun (2023) – a typhoon that also hit South Korea at similar intensity
