= Typhoon Maemi =

Pacific typhoon in 2003

Typhoon Maemi (Pogi)
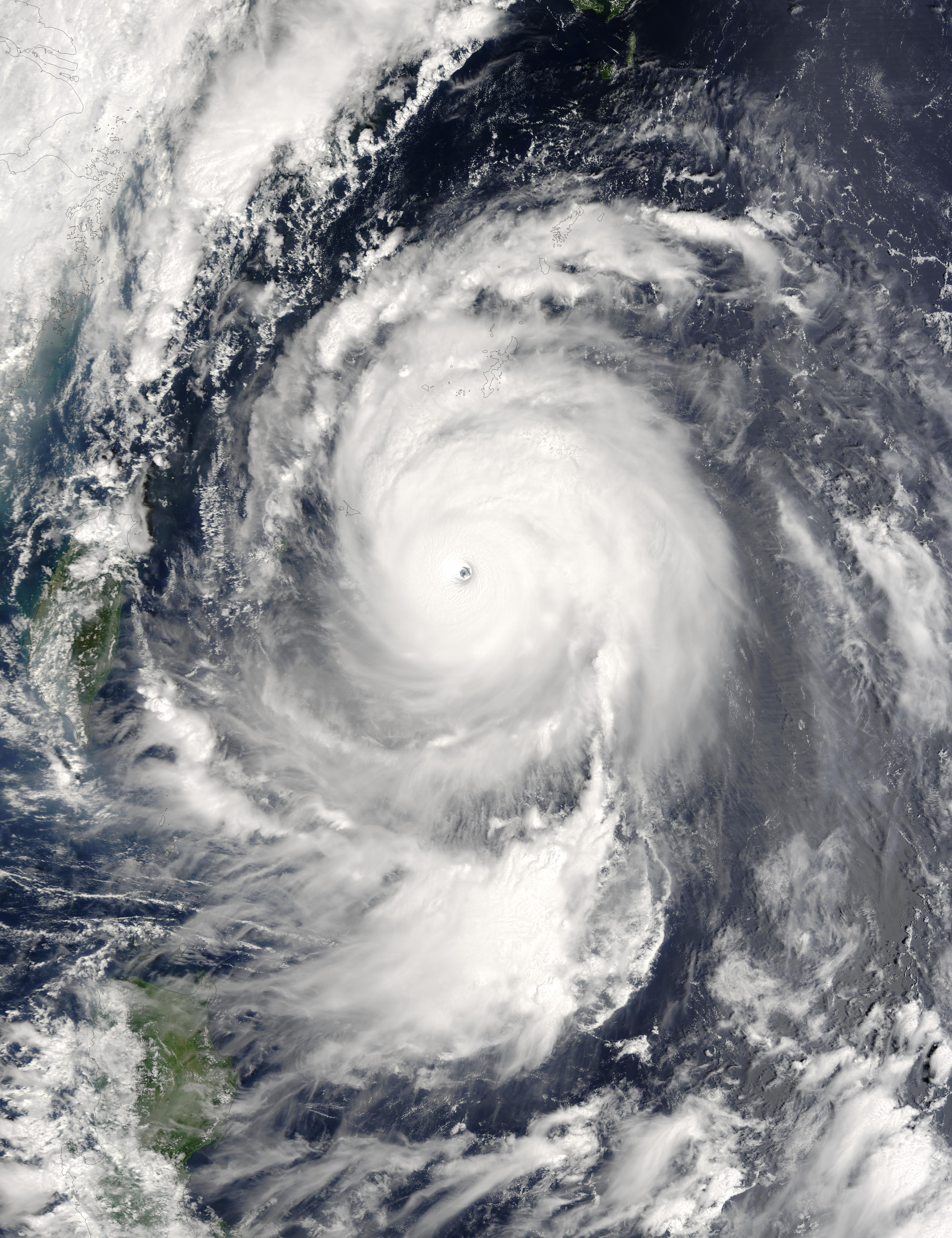
- Typhoon Maemi at peak intensity on September 10

Meteorological history
- Formed: September 5, 2003
- Extratropical: September 13, 2003
- Dissipated: September 16, 2003

Violent typhoon
- 10-minute sustained (JMA)
- Highest winds: 195 km/h (120 mph)
- Lowest pressure: 910 hPa (mbar); 26.87 inHg

Category 5-equivalent super typhoon
- 1-minute sustained (SSHWS/JTWC)
- Highest winds: 280 km/h (175 mph)
- Lowest pressure: 885 hPa (mbar); 26.13 inHg

Overall effects
- Fatalities: 120 total
- Damage: $4.8 billion (2003 USD)
- Areas affected: Miyako-jima, Okinawa, Taiwan, South Korea, North Korea
- IBTrACS
- Part of the 2003 Pacific typhoon season

Typhoon Maemi, (Note: The name Maemi (Korean: 매미, [ˈmɛ(ː)mi]) was contributed by North Korea and means cicada in Korean.) known in the Philippines as Typhoon Pogi, was the most powerful typhoon to strike South Korea since record-keeping began in the country in 1904. The fourteenth named storm, eighth typhoon and third super typhoon (Note: A super typhoon is an unofficial category used by the Joint Typhoon Warning Center (JTWC) for a typhoon with winds of at least 240 km/h (150 mph).) of the 2003 Pacific typhoon season, Maemi developed from a disturbance in a monsoon trough on September 4. It strengthened into Tropical Storm Maemi, named by the Japan Meteorological Agency (JMA). Moving northwestward, it became a typhoon on September 8. It briefly crossed into the warning territory of PAGASA, which gave it the local name Pogi. Favorable conditions facilitated more rapid strengthening; the storm developed a well-defined eye and reached peak maximum sustained winds of 195 km/h (120 mph) on September 10. (Note: Tropical cyclone intensities are measured by maximum sustained winds. In the western Pacific Ocean, the Japan Meteorological Agency estimates sustained winds over a duration of ten minutes, while the Joint Typhoon Warning Center estimates sustained winds over a one-minute duration. One-minute sustained winds are roughly 12% stronger than ten-minute sustained winds.) While near peak intensity, Maemi decelerated and began turning to the north-northeast. Soon after, the eyewall passed over Miyako-jima, Japan with a minimum barometric pressure of 912 mbar (26.9 inHg), the fourth-lowest pressure recorded in the nation. Due to warm sea surface temperatures, Maemi was able to maintain much of its intensity before it made landfall just west of Busan, South Korea, on September 12. The typhoon underwent extratropical transition in the Sea of Japan the next day, although its remnants persisted for several days, lashing northern Japan with strong winds.

The typhoon first affected the Ryukyu Islands of Japan. On Miyako-jima, strong winds damaged 104 buildings and left 95% of residents without power. Maemi caused heavy rainfall there, bringing a total rainfall of 58.5 mm (2.30 in) in an hour and 402.5 mm (15.85 in) in 24 hours, with the latter setting a new record. One person died after being struck by airborne debris. Elsewhere in Japan, the storm caused flights to be canceled, and rainfall-induced landslides blocked roads. There were two other deaths in Japan, and damage totaled JP¥11.3 billion (US$96 million USD). (Note: All currency values are given in 2003 values of their respective currencies.) Damage was heaviest in South Korea, particularly where it moved ashore. On Jeju Island, Maemi produced a wind gusts that peaked at 216 km/h (134 mph) and a minimum pressure of 950 mbar (28 inHg), both breaking records for the country; the pressure reading broke the longstanding lowest pressure set by Typhoon Sarah in 1959. Winds in Busan near where the typhoon made landfall reached 154 km/h (96 mph), the second-highest on record. The port sustained heavy damage, restricting exports in the months following the storm. Nationwide, high winds destroyed approximately 5,000 houses, damaged 13,000 homes and businesses, leaving 25,000 people homeless. About 1.47 million households lost power, and widespread crop damage occurred, resulting in the poorest rice harvest in 23 years. Across South Korea, Maemi was responsible for 117 deaths. Overall damage in the country totaled ₩5.52 trillion (US$4.8 billion).

== Meteorological history ==
Map plotting the storm's track and intensity, according to the Saffir–Simpson scale Map key Saffir–Simpson scale Tropical depression (≤38 mph, ≤62 km/h) Tropical storm (39–73 mph, 63–118 km/h) Category 1 (74–95 mph, 119–153 km/h) Category 2 (96–110 mph, 154–177 km/h) Category 3 (111–129 mph, 178–208 km/h) Category 4 (130–156 mph, 209–251 km/h) Category 5 (≥157 mph, ≥252 km/h) Unknown Storm type Tropical cyclone Subtropical cyclone Extratropical cyclone, remnant low, tropical disturbance, or monsoon depression

In early September 2003, a monsoon trough created a tropical disturbance near Guam. The system consisted of a disorganized area of convection, or thunderstorms, in an area of moderate wind shear. By September 4, the convection was becoming better organized around a weak low-level circulation. Despite the wind shear, the system continued to develop, becoming a tropical depression north of Chuuk State. At 0200 UTC on September 5, the Joint Typhoon Warning Center (JTWC) (Note: The Joint Typhoon Warning Center is a joint United States Navy–United States Air Force task force that issues tropical cyclone warnings for the western Pacific Ocean and other regions.) issued a Tropical Cyclone Formation Alert, and later that day initiated advisories on Tropical Depression 15W just west of Guam. By that time, the convection had increased over the center. For the first week of its existence, the cyclone tracked generally northwestward, steered by a subtropical ridge to the north.

Early on September 6, the Japan Meteorological Agency (JMA) (Note: The Japan Meteorological Agency is the official Regional Specialized Meteorological Center for the western Pacific Ocean.) upgraded the depression to a tropical storm and named it Maemi. With more favorable conditions, including lesser wind shear and enhanced outflow, the storm continued to intensify. The JMA upgraded Maemi to a severe tropical storm on September 7 and to typhoon status – winds of over 119 km/h (74 mph) – the next day. The JTWC had upgraded Maemi to typhoon status on September 7 after an eye feature appeared on satellite imagery. Also around that time, the Philippine Atmospheric, Geophysical and Astronomical Services Administration (PAGASA) began issuing advisories on the storm, giving it the local name Pogi, although the typhoon would remain away from the country. On September 8, Maemi began undergoing rapid deepening due to enhanced outflow, aided by the flow of an approaching shortwave trough. At 1200 UTC on September 9, the JTWC estimated 1-minute sustained winds of 240 km/h (150 mph) and designated Maemi as a super typhoon. The next day, the same agency estimated peak winds of 280 km/h (170 mph) and gusts to 335 km/h (208 mph), the equivalent of a Category 5 on the Saffir-Simpson scale. At 1200 UTC on September 10, the JMA estimated peak 10-minute winds of 195 km/h (121 mph) and a minimum barometric pressure of 910 mbar (27 inHg) while the storm was 155 km (96 mi) southeast of the Japanese island of Miyako-jima. At peak intensity, Maemi was a small typhoon, with gale-force winds extending only 240 km (150 mi) from the well-defined eye.

Around the time of peak intensity, Maemi was slowing its forward motion and began turning to the north, after the eastward-moving trough weakened the ridge. At 1900 UTC on September 10, the typhoon passed within 10 km (6.2 mi) of Miyako-jima. While the eye was passing over the island, the pressure fell to 912 mbar (26.9 inHg) and winds reached 250 km/h (160 mph). Maemi weakened slightly as it continued north, passing about 220 km (140 mi) west of Okinawa on September 11 while undergoing an eyewall replacement cycle. Increasingly hostile conditions from the approaching trough caused further weakening, and the JTWC estimated the typhoon passed just east of Jeju Island with 1-minute winds of 185 km/h (115 mph) at 0600 UTC on September 12. Shortly after, Maemi made landfall just west of Busan, South Korea, with the JMA estimating 10-minute winds of 140 km/h (87 mph), and JTWC estimating 1-minute winds of 165 km/h (103 mph). Risk Management Solutions estimated landfall winds of 190 km/h (120 mph), which surpassed Typhoon Sarah in 1959. This made Maemi the strongest typhoon to strike the country since the Korea Meteorological Administration began keeping records in 1904. The storm was able to maintain much of its intensity due to warm sea surface temperatures and its fast forward motion. Maemi rapidly weakened to tropical storm status while moving over land, and was undergoing extratropical transition by the time it entered the Sea of Japan. Increasing wind shear removed the convection from the increasingly ill-defined circulation center. The JTWC issued its final warning on Maemi early on September 13, declaring the storm extratropical. The JMA followed suit later that day, tracking Maemi over northern Japan and declaring it extratropical over the Sea of Okhotsk. The remnants of Maemi persisted for several more days, until the JMA stopped tracking it on September 16 southwest of the Kamchatka Peninsula. According to the Mariners Weather Log, the remnants of Maemi continued to the east, eventually striking the coast of Alaska on September 21.

== Preparations ==
In Japan, the threat of the typhoon caused airlines to cancel 145 flights, mostly in and around Okinawa. About 50 American army bases in Okinawa were closed, and non-essential workers were told to remain home.

Before Maemi made landfall in South Korea, officials issued flood warnings along the Nakdong River due to dams opening floodgates. About 25,000 people were forced to evacuate, either to schools or relatives' houses. The Korea Meteorological Administration advised travelers to take precaution in advance of the storm. Ferry and airplane services were canceled to Jeju island, stranding residents ahead of the Chuseok holiday.

Officials in Primorsky Krai in the Russian Far East issued a storm warning, noting the potential for strong winds and heavy rainfall.

== Impact ==
=== Japan ===
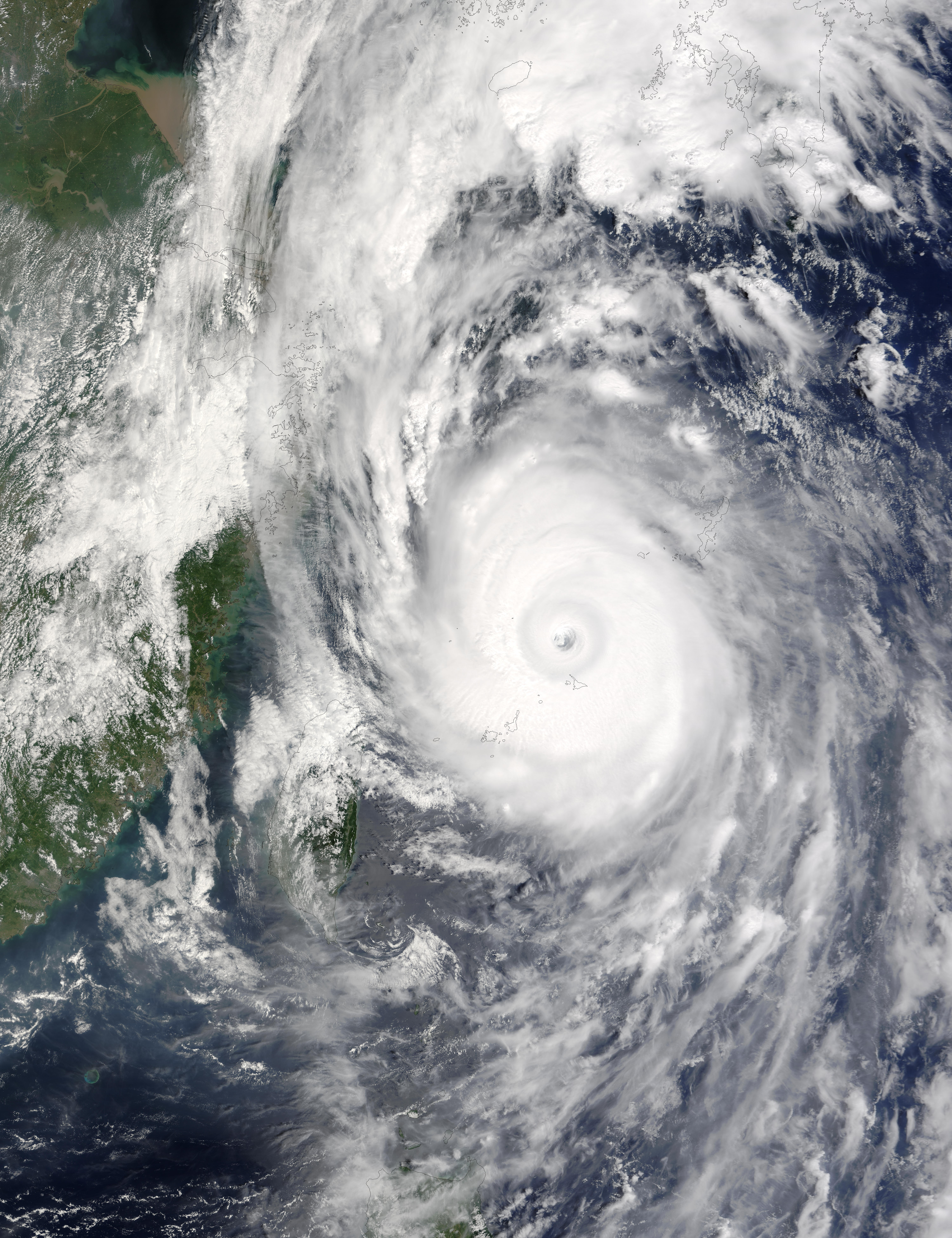
Typhoon Maemi over Ryukyu Islands on September 11

Typhoon Maemi first affected the Japanese island of Miyako-jima, where gusts reached 266 km/h (165 mph), and sustained winds reached 152 km/h (94 mph). For 16 hours, excluding the 2-hour passage of the eye, the pressure fell to 912 mbar (26.9 inHg), the second-lowest on record on the island after Typhoon Sarah in 1959, and at the time the fourth lowest in all of Japan. The typhoon produced heavy rainfall on Miyako-jima totaling 470 mm (19 in), of which 402.5 mm (15.85 in) fell in 24 hours, breaking the daily record. Also on the island, 58.5 mm (2.30 in) fell in one hour, and 22 mm (0.87 in) fell in just 10 minutes. On the island, Maemi damaged 104 buildings, including two severely damaged houses. The storm damaged roads in 36 locations and caused a power outage, affecting about 20,900 people, or 95% of the island. One person on Miyako-jima died after being struck by flying glass.

News agencies considered Maemi the strongest typhoon to affect Okinawa since 1968. Elsewhere in Okinawa Prefecture, wind gusts reached 109 km/h (68 mph) in Nago. On Ishigaki Island, strong winds damaged houses and crops, while high tides flooded low-lying buildings. Across the region, 94 people were injured, mostly from broken glass.

Shortly before Maemi made its final landfall, it produced wind gusts of 167 km/h (104 mph) at Izuhara, a Japanese island halfway between South Korea and Japan. Along the southwest coast of Japan, a weather station in Hirado reported gusts of 113 km/h (70 mph). The typhoon resulted in heavy rainfall on the Japanese main island of Kyushu, reaching 457 mm (18.0 in) at a station in Miyazaki Prefecture. Rainfall-induced landslides in Nagasaki forced 191 people to evacuate their homes. Heavy rainfall also caused landslides in Ōita Prefecture, and Kōchi Prefecture, where several roads were closed. The threat of the storm caused schools to close in Yamaguchi Prefecture. The storm spawned an F1 tornado in Kōchi that damaged several houses and flipped over a car, injuring a woman inside. As an extratropical storm, Maemi left 2,500 people in Hokkaido without power after producing gusts of 108 km/h (67 mph) in Hakodate. Wind gusts reached 116 km/h (72 mph) in Akita, the third-highest September wind gust at the station. A falling tree in Sapporo killed one person and injured two others. High waves damaged fisheries and 54 ships in Matsumae alone, and nationwide 262 ships were damaged. Rough seas also killed one person in Akita Prefecture. The typhoon destroyed 1,498 homes across the country and flooded 363 others. The storm also damaged 9 ha (22 acres) of fields. In total, Maemi killed three people and injured 107 in Japan, two severely. Overall damage totaled ¥11.3 billion (JPY, $96 million USD). (Note: The total was originally reported in Japanese yen. Total converted via the Oanda Corporation website.)

=== South Korea ===
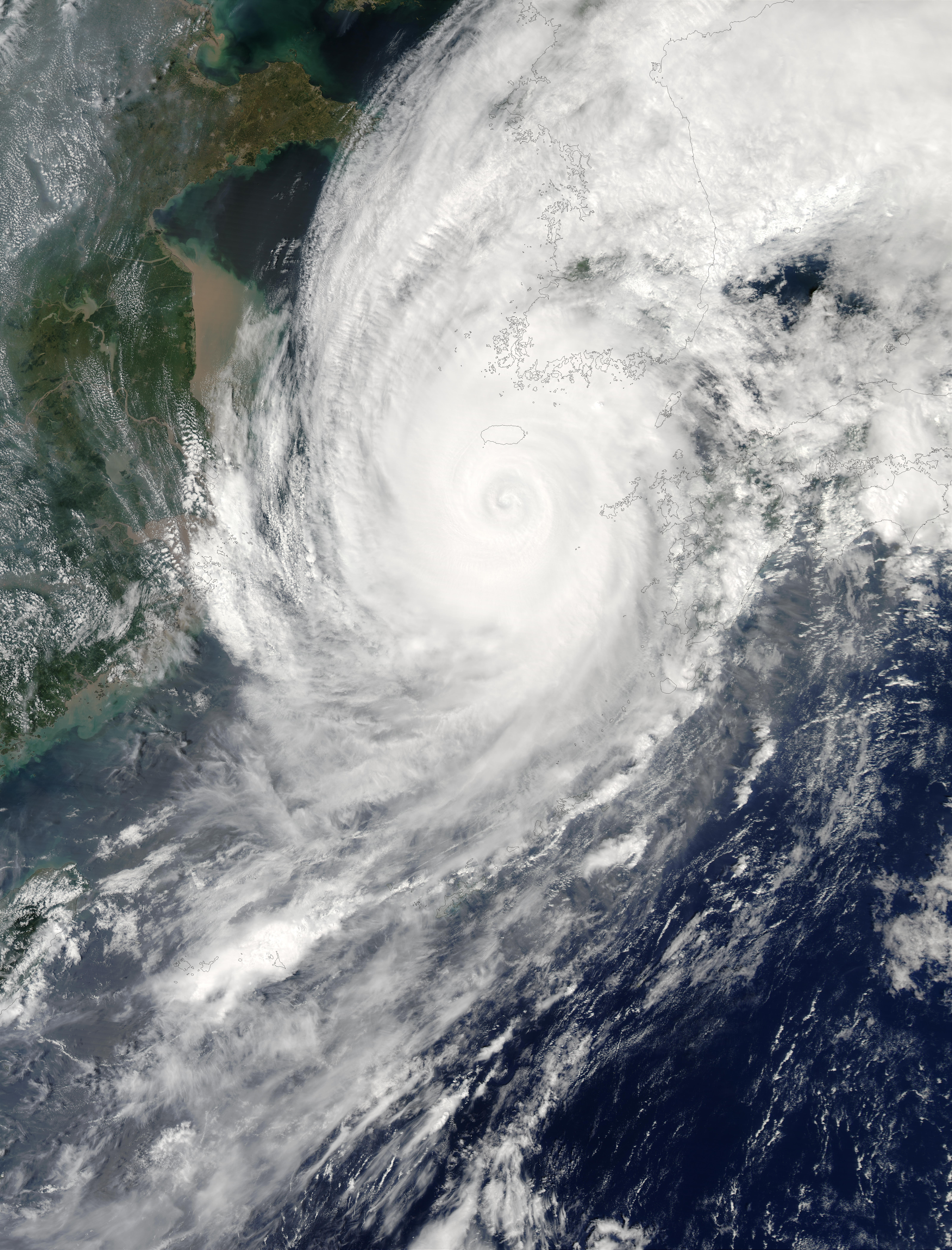
Typhoon Maemi approaching South Korea on September 12

Since Typhoon Maemi took a path closer to the form of a parabolic, a typical pattern of typhoons from outbreak to extinction, it was relatively possible to predict its course and the possibility of landing on the Korean Peninsula was expected fairly early. The Korea Meteorological Administration officially announced the typhoon's possible landing off the southern coast of the Korean Peninsula at 5 p.m. on September 10, making the news widely known through major media organizations. When Typhoon Maemi struck South Korea, it caused heavy rainfall that peaked at 453 mm (17.8 in). Rainfall reached 401.5 mm (15.81 in) in Namhae County, and 255 mm (10.0 in) on Jeju Island. The rain was less widespread and caused less flooding than Typhoon Rusa, which struck the country a year prior, but damage from Maemi was heavier due to strong winds. On Jeju Island, Maemi produced a wind gust of 216 km/h (134 mph) and a minimum pressure of 950 mbar (28 inHg), both setting records for the country. The winds broke the record of 210 km/h (130 mph) set by Typhoon Prapiroon in 2000, and the pressure was 1.5 mbar lower than that during Typhoon Sarah in 1959, which was one of the strongest storms to strike South Korea after Maemi. On the South Korean mainland, the Pusan International Airport reported wind gusts of 143 km/h (89 mph). Winds in Busan reached 154 km/h (96 mph), the second-highest wind speed for the city after Typhoon Thelma in 1987. Due to high winds, five nuclear power plants were shut down automatically, but were ultimately unaffected.

In South Korea, damage was heaviest in South Gyeongsang Province, where 71 people were killed. Damage was particularly heavy in Busan, as well in as Yecheon, Ulsan, and Daegu. In Busan, strong winds wrecked 11 lifting cranes, each weighing about 900 tons, which injured five people and killed two in one incident. Many shipyards in the region were closed, and initial reports estimated it would take a year to fully reopen the Busan port. The estimated damage to the Busan port was about $50 million (USD), causing cargo capacity to be cut by 20%. High waves turned a large ship on its side in Busan, and in Ulsan the waves knocked an offshore shipbuilding plant into a petroleum facility, damaging them both. Sixteen people were killed in Busan.

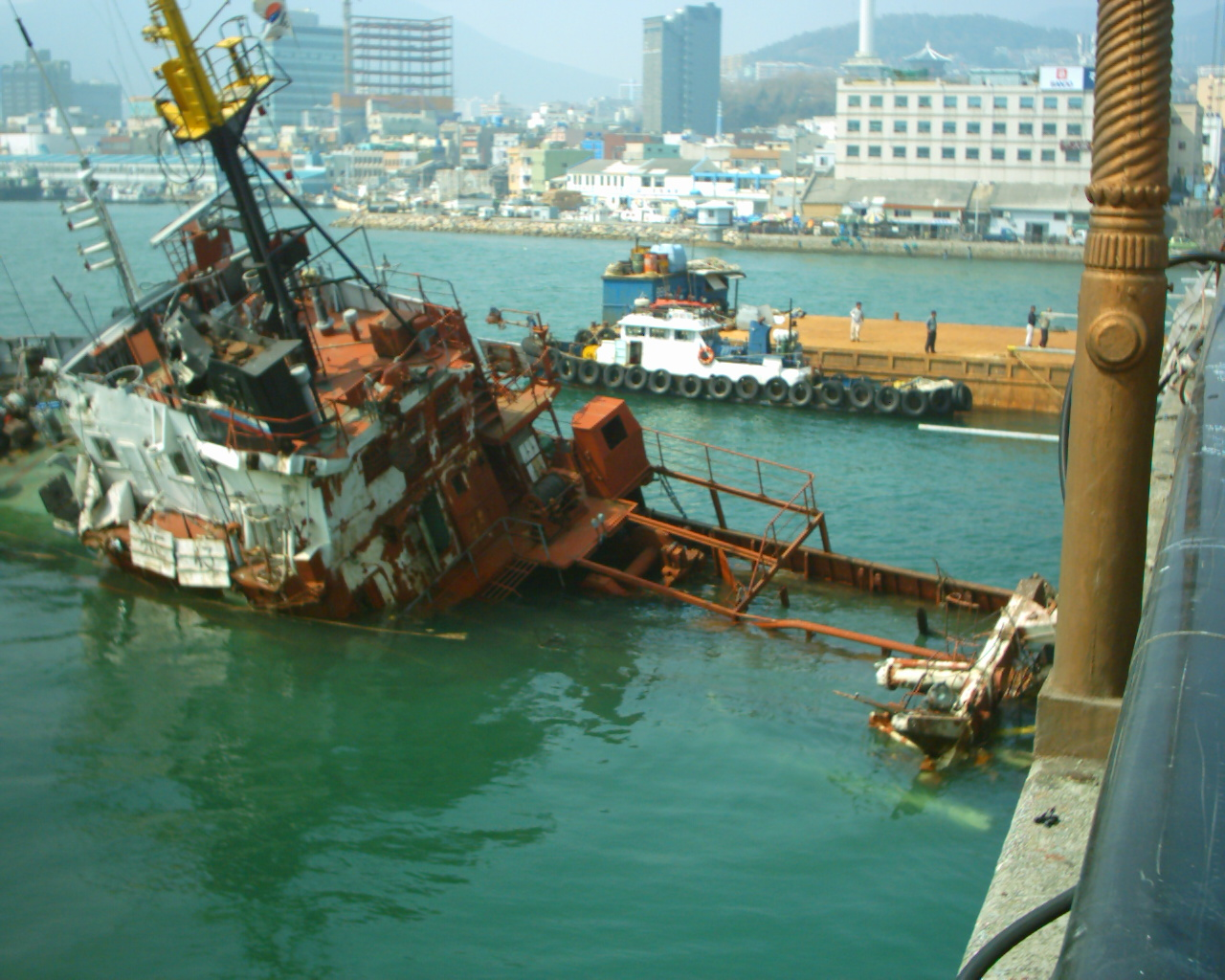
Wrecked ship below Yeongdo Bridge, Busan, after Maemi

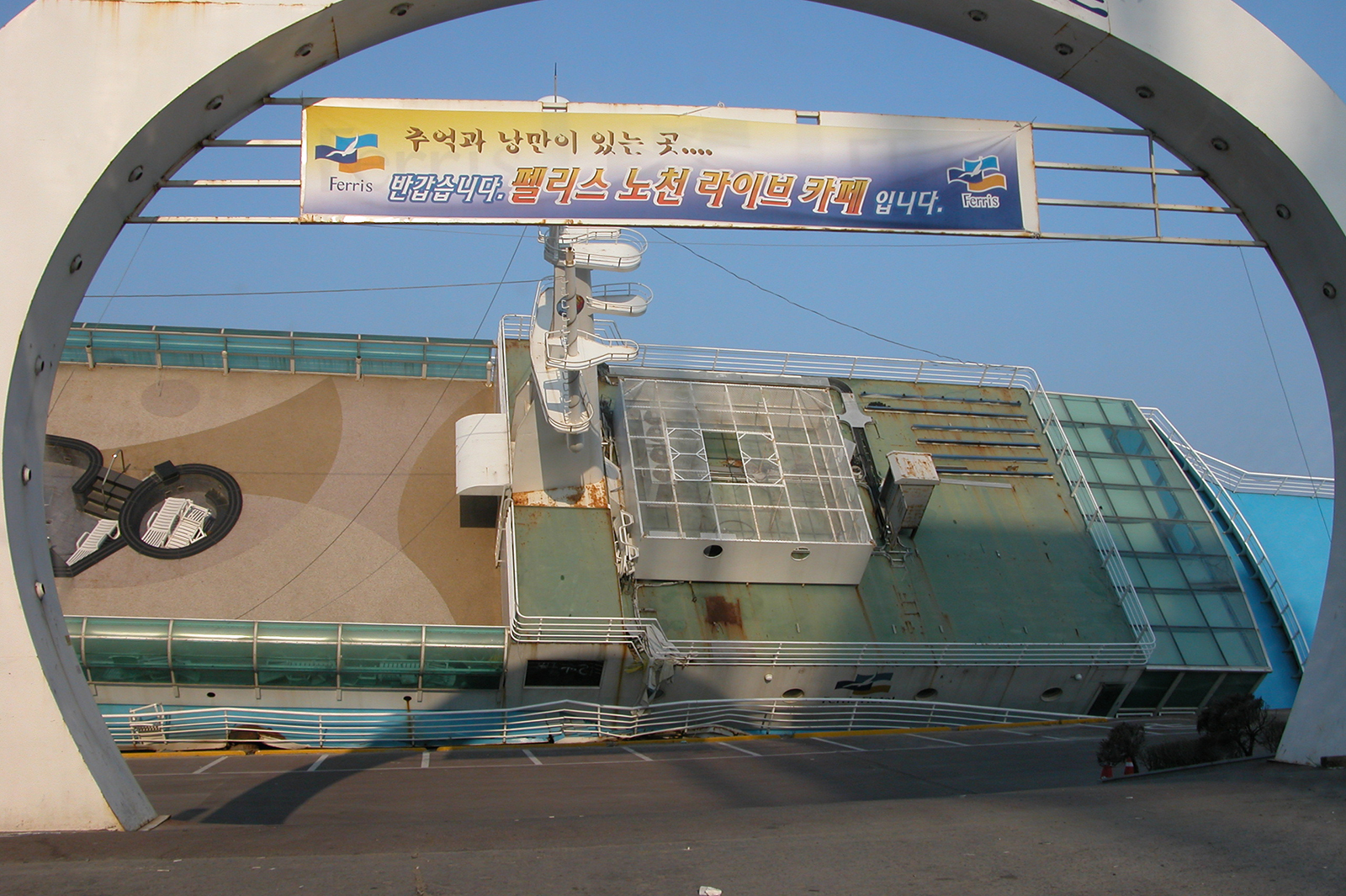
Ship cafe wrecked by Typhoon Maemi, Busan, South Korea

High tides flooded hundreds of houses along the coast, particularly in areas without seawalls. In Masan, the storm caused 12 fatalities when it flooded an underground shopping center. On Jeju Island to the south of the country, Maemi destroyed sets of the Korean drama TV series All In, and wrecked 32 houses. Two people were killed on the island, one of whom while attempting to secure his boat. Throughout the country, 465 boats were damaged or beached. The heavy rainfall caused mudslides, one of which in Chungcheong derailed a train, injuring 28 aboard. Mudslides closed several roads, and damaged five rail lines in ten locations. Nationwide, the storm damaged 2,278 roads and bridges, as well as nearly 40,000 cars. Intense rainfall also caused flooding along the Nakdong River, reaching a flood stage of 5.06 m (16.6 ft) near Busan. There, the river produced a discharge of about 13,000 m^{3}/s (460,000 ft^{3}/s), strong enough to destroy a section of the Gupo Bridge. Along a tributary of the Nakdong River, floods destroyed a dyke near Daegu. Maemi also flooded 37,986 ha (93,870 acres) of fields before the fall harvest, causing widespread damage to the rice crop. On Ulleungdo island off the eastern coast, Maemi washed away the primary road and many houses, killing three. Residents there complained about the lack of advance warning.

Typhoon Maemi left about 1.47 million electric customers without power around the country, causing ₩12.9 billion (KRW, US$11.61 million) (Note: The total was originally reported in South Korean won. Total converted via the Oanda Corporation website.) in damage to power companies. Widespread damage interrupted mobile and cell phone service. United States military bases in the country sustained about $4.5 million in damage. Nationwide, Maemi destroyed about 5,000 houses and damaged 13,000 homes and businesses, leaving 25,000 people homeless. About 150 businesses in Gangwon Province were destroyed by Typhoon Rusa in 2002, only to be destroyed again by Maemi when they were rebuilt. Insured damages from Maemi were estimated at ₩650 billion (KRW, $565 million), mostly property damage. (Note: Damage totals for South Korea were provided by the Guy Carpenter reinsurance intermediary.) The insured damage was over four times the amount of insured damage from Typhoon Rusa the year prior. Overall damage was estimated at ₩5.52 trillion (KRW, US$4.8 billion). By comparison, this total was ₩2.52 trillion (KRW, US$1.9 billion) less than Rusa; the discrepancy between the insured and overall damage was due to Maemi causing heavier industrial damage, while Rusa caused more damage overall. The storm killed 117 people throughout South Korea.

=== Elsewhere ===
Although the typhoon prompted the PAGASA to hoist warnings – and in spite of initial concerns that the cyclone would enhance monsoonal rainfall – Maemi did not cause any damage in the Philippines.

While recurving east of Taiwan, Maemi dropped significant rainfall, peaking at 227.5 mm (8.96 in) in Ilan County. The rains helped ease drought conditions and replenished parched reservoirs.

In North Korea, Maemi produced about 186 mm (7.3 in) of rainfall, although further details of the storm's effects there were unknown due to press censorship.

== Aftermath ==
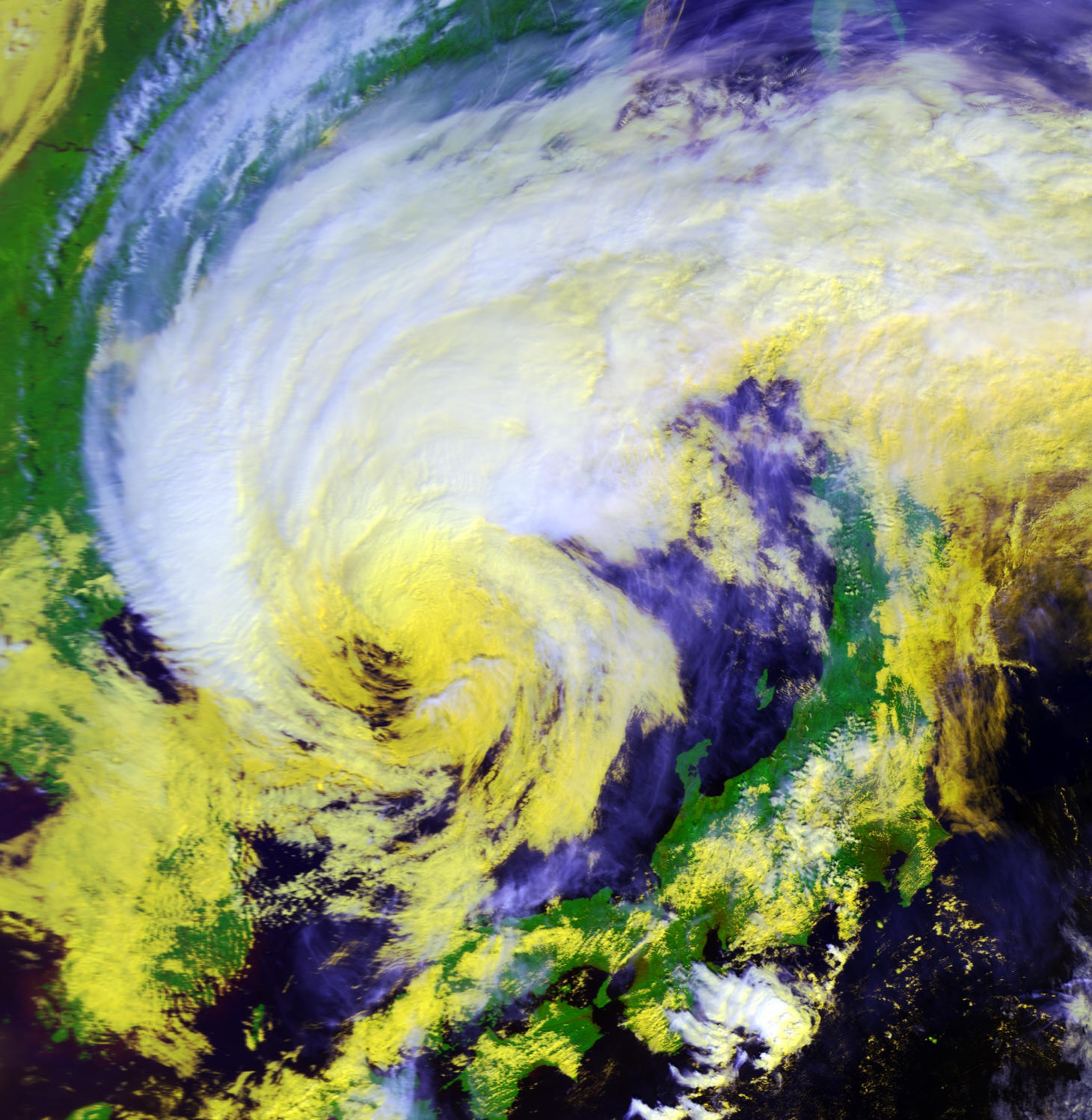
Tropical Storm Maemi in the Sea of Japan on September 13

Following the storm, South Korean President Roh Moo-hyun declared the entire of the country excluding Seoul and Incheon as special disaster areas, after touring the storm damage in Busan. The government provided tax breaks and allocated ₩1.4 trillion (KRW, $1.2 billion) in assistance to the affected residents, after an additional budget was passed in late September 2003. This included ₩100 billion (KRW, US$90 million) in immediate funds for search and rescue missions. After the storm, residents complained they did not receive adequate warning and not enough coastal areas were evacuated, which led to the high death toll. Widespread damage and continued flooding caused traffic jams in the days following the storm. A damaged rail line prompted operators to provide alternate bus service. Landslides throughout the country forced travelers to use alternate routes. By three days after the storm, most damaged roads and highways were reopened. About 33,000 members of the South Korean Army were deployed to assist in relief efforts, such as clearing roads and delivering aid to storm victims. Workers quickly restored power to 95% of customers within 24 hours. The government installed four new cranes for the Busan port, and assisted operators to ensure exports would not be delayed. Heavy crop damage caused fruit and vegetable prices to rise, and fish and crop exports rose 9.2% on average. The rice harvest was the lowest in 23 years, due to the storm and a government effort to limit production. To assist farmers, the government increased purchases in federal contracts. Three government-run banks provided low-rate loans for businesses damaged by the storm. Residual flooding from Maemi contributed to an outbreak of conjunctivitis in the southern portion of the country. To prevent additional outbreaks, the Korean National Institute of Health sent 1,000 workers to storm-damaged areas. The Korea Exchange fell 1.8% due to fears that storm damage would disrupt exports.

For the month of September 2003, the Korea Electric Power Corporation waived electric bills for residents who lost their homes, and cut bills in half for residents and businesses who lost power. The South Korean government allowed companies to increase premiums for car insurance by 3.5% due to the widespread car damage. Due to storm damage, 34 companies were forced to temporarily close. Loss of production and disruptions were expected to subtract 0.5% from the forecast economic growth in 2003. The Consumer Confidence Index dropped to its lowest level in five years, largely due to the typhoon damage and weakened economic conditions. Following the strikes of Rusa and Maemi in consecutive years, the South Korean government worked on disaster management and mitigation programs. In March 2004, the government passed the "Emergency and Safety Management Basic Act", largely due to the storm as well as the Daegu metro fire, which effectively set up a nationwide emergency management system. The Gupo bridge damaged during the storm was repaired in 2007.

Although the South Korean government did not request international aid, several countries sent aid to the country. A few days after Maemi struck, the United States Agency for International Development sent $50,000 (USD) to the Korean Red Cross. Later, the government of Japan sent ¥9.5 million (US$85,000) worth of supplies to South Korea, including sleeping mats, generators, and water units. Taiwan also provided $100,000 in aid. The Republic of Korea National Red Cross utilized 700 volunteers and 200 staff members to distribute food and blankets to 8,190 houses, while local offices provided over 5,500 meals. Members of Food for the Hungry delivered food and clothing to storm-damaged residents in Masan.

As a result of the damage and deaths caused by the storm, the World Meteorological Organization retired the name Maemi in 2006 and replaced it with Mujigae.

== See also ==
- Tropical cyclones in 2003
- Weather of 2003
- Typhoons in the Korean Peninsula
- List of retired Pacific typhoon names
- Typhoon Sanba (2012), another strong typhoon that struck South Korea
- Typhoon Neoguri (2014)
- Typhoon Chaba (2016)
- Typhoon Kong-rey (2018), took a similar track
- Typhoon Hinnamnor (2022), also struck South Korea as a strong typhoon
