= Tropical Storm Gladys (1991) =

Pacific tropical storm in 1991

Severe Tropical Storm Gladys
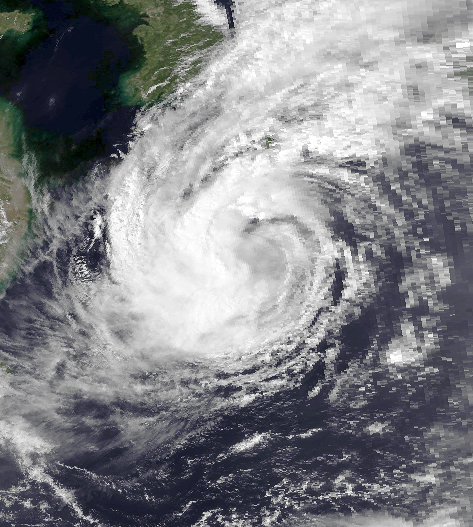
- Tropical Storm Gladys early on August 21

Meteorological history
- Formed: August 15, 1991
- Dissipated: August 24, 1991

Severe tropical storm
- 10-minute sustained (JMA)
- Highest winds: 110 km/h (70 mph)
- Lowest pressure: 965 hPa (mbar); 28.50 inHg

Category 1-equivalent typhoon
- 1-minute sustained (SSHWS/JTWC)
- Highest winds: 120 km/h (75 mph)
- Lowest pressure: 973 hPa (mbar); 28.73 inHg

Overall effects
- Fatalities: 113 total
- Damage: $253 million (1991 USD)
- Areas affected: Japan, South Korea
- IBTrACS
- Part of the 1991 Pacific typhoon season

Severe Tropical Storm Gladys in August 1991 was a large tropical cyclone that affected Japan and South Korea. An area of disturbed weather first formed within the Western Pacific monsoon trough on August 15. Slowly organizing, the disturbance developed into a tropical depression on August 15. Heading northwest, Gladys became a tropical storm the following day. Despite forecasts of significant strengthening, its large size only enabled slow intensification. After turning west, Gladys attained peak intensity on August 21 near Okinawa. After turning north and bypassing Kyushu, Gladys began to encounter significant wind shear, which caused weakening. Gladys veered west, interacting with land. Gladys weakened to a tropical depression on August 24, and dissipated the next day.

Affecting the Philippines weeks after a volcanic eruption, the storm forced 67,000 people to evacuate but there were no deaths. Across southern Japan, the storm dropped heavy rains, with rainfall totals in some areas exceeding 710 mm (28 in). Overall, 23 fatalities were reported and 11 others sustained injuries. Nearly 200,000 train passengers were stranded. A total 53 houses were destroyed while 4,162 others were flooded. According to the National Police Agency, torrential rains caused 92 landslides, damaged 48 roads, and washed away four bridges. Four ships as well as 4,142 hectares (10,240 acres) of farmland were damaged. Monetary damage totaled ¥11.9 billion ($88.4 million USD). The storm's unusually large wind field resulted in extremely heavy precipitation across South Korea, where at least 90 people were killed while 62 others were injured. About 6,700 houses were flooded and over 1,500 houses were damaged, which resulted in 40,000 homeless. Over 100 hectares (250 acres) of farmland were inundated. Damage there was estimated at US$164 million.

== Meteorological history ==
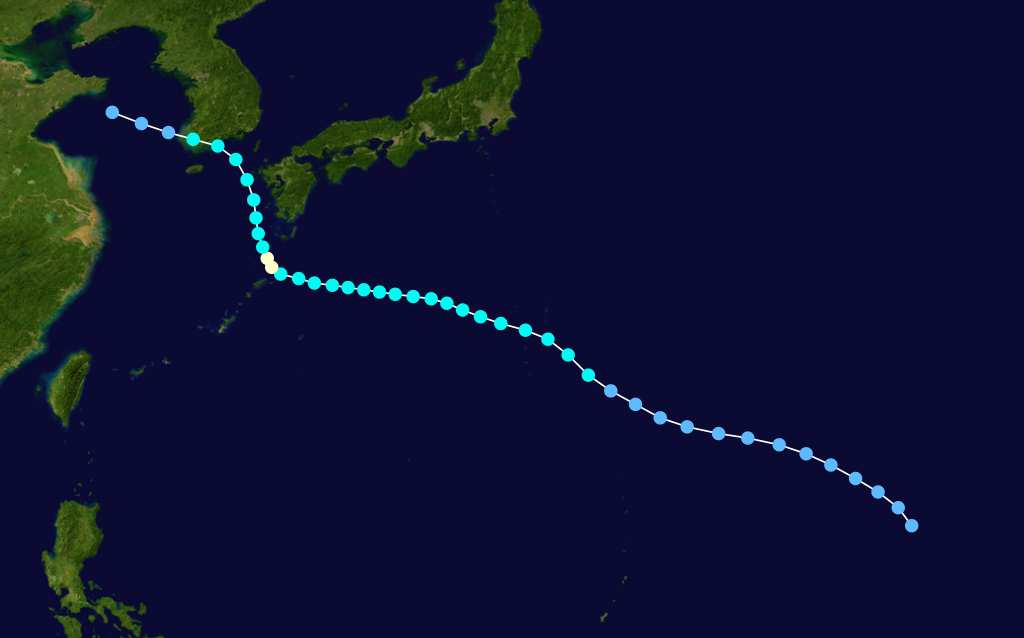
Map plotting the storm's track and intensity, according to the Saffir–Simpson scale Map key Saffir–Simpson scale Tropical depression (≤38 mph, ≤62 km/h) Tropical storm (39–73 mph, 63–118 km/h) Category 1 (74–95 mph, 119–153 km/h) Category 2 (96–110 mph, 154–177 km/h) Category 3 (111–129 mph, 178–208 km/h) Category 4 (130–156 mph, 209–251 km/h) Category 5 (≥157 mph, ≥252 km/h) Unknown Storm type Tropical cyclone Subtropical cyclone Extratropical cyclone, remnant low, tropical disturbance, or monsoon depression

The origins of Gladys can be traced back to an active Western Pacific monsoon trough during mid-August 1991. An area of disturbed weather developed within the trough late on August 13. A weak low-pressure area then developed and over the next two days, the disturbance slowly organized while tracking northwestward. The JMA upgraded the disturbance into a tropical depression at 00:00 UTC on August 15 while the JTWC issued a Tropical Cyclone Formation Alert (TCFA) at 07:30 UTC. (Note: The Japan Meteorological Agency is the official Regional Specialized Meteorological Center for the western Pacific Ocean.) An increase in curved banding features prompted the JTWC to declare the system Tropical Depression 14W at 00:00 UTC on August 16. At the same time, the JMA upgraded the depression into a tropical storm, (Note: Wind estimates from the JMA and most other basins throughout the world are sustained over 10 minutes, while estimates from the United States-based Joint Typhoon Warning Center are sustained over 1 minute. 10-minute winds are about 1.14 times the amount of 1-minute winds.) with the JTWC following suit that evening.

Initially, Gladys was forecast by the JTWC to intensify considerably, with one advisory predicting winds of 225 km/h (140 mph), just below super typhoon intensity, and through August 18, the JTWC forecast the storm to attain winds of at least 185 km/h (115 mph). However, Gladys's large size prevented significant organization, with tropical storm force winds extending some 665 km (415 mi) from the center. On August 17, the JMA upgraded Gladys into a severe tropical storm. Continuing to slowly intensify, Gladys turned west, contrast to forecasts of recurvature, and tracked through the Ryukyu Islands. On August 18, the JMA estimated that the storm attained its peak velocity of 115 km/h (70 mph), which it would maintain for several days. Surface observations from the Amami Ōshima prompted the JTWC to upgrade Gladys to a typhoon early on August 21 while, at the time, it was located 165 km (105 mi) northeast of Okinawa. At this time, the JTWC estimated peak intensity of 120 km/h (75 mph) while the JMA estimated a minimum barometric pressure of 965 mbar (28.5 inHg). The same day, the storm turned north, passing west of Kyushu before turning northwest east of the Korean Peninsula under the influence of a ridge over the Sea of Japan. A passing trough to its north enhanced southerly wind shear, and that along with land interaction triggered rapid weakening. The JTWC discontinued warnings at noon on August 23, with the JMA classifying Gladys as a tropical depression the next day. The JMA ceased tracking the storm altogether on August 25.

== Impact ==
=== Philippines ===
Monsoon rains caused by Gladys prompted maximum weather alerts for nine major river valleys in the provinces of Tarlac, Pampanga, and Zambales, all previously affected by a volcanic eruption weeks earlier. In the later, 15,000 people were evacuated from six villages while 52,000 others were evacuated from nine cities in Pampanga. Many areas, including Manila, sustained flooding, but no fatalities were reported.

=== Japan ===
Due to Gladys's large wind field, the storm dropped heavy rainfall across much of the Japanese archipelago for several days. The heaviest rainfall occurred near Kyusyu, where many locations received over 710 mm (28 in) of precipitation. A peak rainfall total of 848 mm (33.4 in) occurred at Hidegadake. A peak hourly rainfall total of 45 mm (1.8 in) was observed in Naze. Meanwhile, a peak daily precipitation total of 415 mm (16.3 in) fell in Koinya. A wind gust of 76 km/h (47 mph) was recorded on Nomozaki.

While passing south of Okinawa, the outer fringes of the storm dropped moderate to heavy rainfall across Tokushima Prefecture. Roads were cut in 15 places and damage there amounted to ¥160 million. On the southern tip of Kyushu Island, two people suffered injuries in Kagoshima Prefecture. A total of 168 homes were damaged and 12 others were destroyed. Twenty-nine homes were damaged and four were demolished, resulting in six people homeless. Throughout Kanagawa Prefecture, sixty-two homes were damaged and three more were destroyed. A total of 35,000 households were left without power. In Hakone, one person died after he fell from his automobile. There, 24 roads necessitated closure. Across Hakone and Odawara, 13 mudslides were reported. Throughout Tokyo, one person was wounded. A total of nineteen homes were damaged and five were destroyed. Roads were flooded in 37 districts across the city. Five people died and three were reported missing in Okutama after a mudslide buried two wooden houses and a hotel. A fire killed three people, left another missing, and injured two others in Izu. Six ferries were delayed offshore Chiba Prefecture. Seven people were killed in Otsuki, two in traffic accidents and five motorists died when a landslide swept their vehicles off a highway. In Ibaraki Prefecture, eighteen homes were damaged and one was destroyed. Further north, in Saitama Prefecture, 1,495 homes were damaged and 224 others were destroyed, resulting in 668 homeless. A total of 1,281 ha (3,170 acres) of arable land was flooded. One person was also injured. Damage in Gunma prefecture amounted to ¥3.8 billion, where 97 roads were destroyed and 38 rivers flooded. Thirty-nine landslides occurred in Tochigi Prefecture. A total of 658 homes were damaged and 76 others were destroyed. Embankments were damaged in 45 locations. Damage there was estimated at ¥14.3 billion. Fifty homes sustained damage in Fukushima Prefecture.

Nationwide, 23 fatalities were reported and 11 others sustained injuries. Nearly 200,000 train passengers were stranded. A total 53 houses were destroyed while 4,162 others were flooded. According to the National Police Agency, torrential rains caused 92 landslides, cut 48 roads and washed away four bridges. Four ships as well as 4,142 ha (10,235 acres) of farmland were damaged. Monetary damage totaled ¥11.9 billion, equal to $88.4 million USD. (Note: All currencies are converted from Japanese yen to United States Dollars using this with an exchange rate of the year 1991.) (Note: All damage totals are in 1990 values of their respective currencies.)

=== South Korea ===
In advance of the storm, 22,000 tourists were evacuated from low-lying areas while 44,000 ships were pulled into shelter. Typhoon warnings were issued for the Cheju area. According to authorities, the primary threat of the cyclone was expected to be heavy rainfall. Tropical Storm Gladys's broad circulation caused torrential rainfall in South Korea; Pusan, South Korea's second largest city, received 610 mm (24 in) of rain in 20 hours, setting a single-day rainfall record. Furthermore, sections along the southeast coast were reported to have received 660 mm (26 in) during the same period. During a 24-hour period in Ulsan, 420 mm (16.4 in) of rain fell, the most ever recorded on record. During a two-day period, Kyongju received 710 mm (28 in), the heaviest recorded during a storm there since record keeping began in 1904.

In Punsan, eight people were confirmed killed and one was rendered missing, with a man dying after he was struck by a falling steel ladder while the remainder drowned in waist-high floodwaters. The primary highway connecting Seoul to Pusan was blocked by a landslide. Just north off Pulsan, the storm's high winds forced a 950,000 kW (1,273,970 hp) nuclear reactor to shut down. In Ulsan, an industrial city 29 km (18 mi) northeast of Pusan, flooding caused many major automobile plants, including 30 Hyundai plants, to halt operations. More than 500 individuals lost their homes. A man was electrocuted in the city when he stepped on a high-voltage power line knocked down by the storm. Further west, five people were killed when their homes were buried in landslides in Changwon. Two people drowned in overflowed rivers in nearby Masan. Throughout South Korea, at least 90 people were killed and 62 others were injured. Telephone lines were cut and rail traffic was disrupted. All domestic flights were cancelled but international flights were not. About 6,700 houses were flooded and over 1,500 houses were damaged, resulting in 40,000 homeless. Over 100 ha (245 acres) of farmland were inundated. Damage was estimated at US$146 million, with property damage exceeding $44 million.

== See also ==
- Tropical Storm Winona (1990)
