= Typhoon Kong-rey (2018) =

Pacific typhoon in 2018

Typhoon Kong-rey (Queenie)
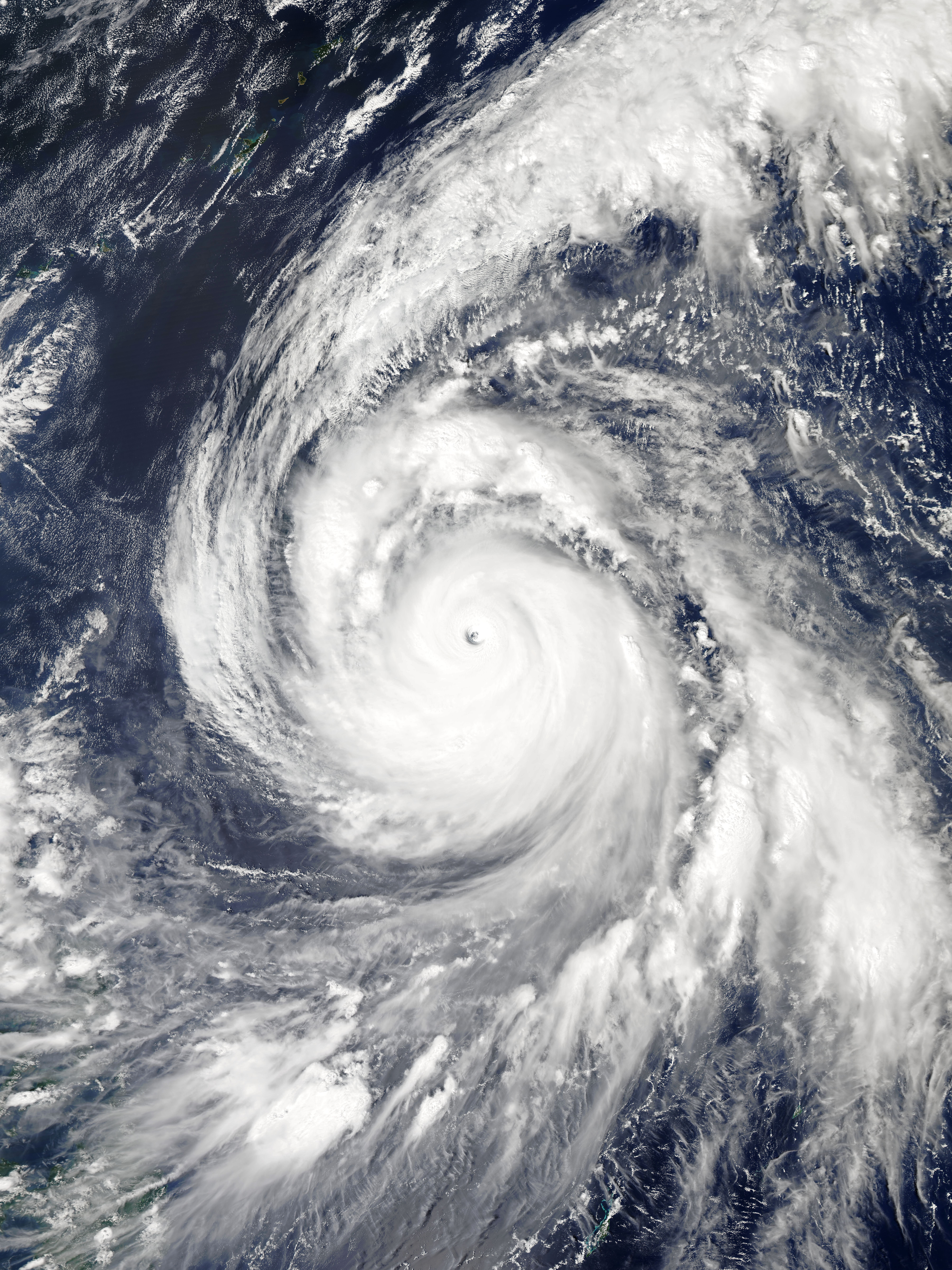
- Typhoon Kong-rey at peak intensity over the Philippine Sea on October 2

Meteorological history
- Formed: September 28, 2018
- Extratropical: October 6, 2018
- Dissipated: October 7, 2018

Violent typhoon
- 10-minute sustained (JMA)
- Highest winds: 215 km/h (130 mph)
- Lowest pressure: 900 hPa (mbar); 26.58 inHg

Category 5-equivalent super typhoon
- 1-minute sustained (SSHWS/JTWC)
- Highest winds: 280 km/h (175 mph)
- Lowest pressure: 906 hPa (mbar); 26.75 inHg

Overall effects
- Fatalities: 3 direct
- Missing: 1
- Damage: $172 million (2018 USD)
- Areas affected: Federated States of Micronesia, Japan, South Korea, East China, Taiwan
- IBTrACS
- Part of the 2018 Pacific typhoon season

Typhoon Kong-rey, (Note: The name Kong-rey (Khmer: កង្រី, [kɑŋ.ˈrəj]) was contributed by Cambodia and refers to a girl from a Khmer legend, as well as a mountain named after that girl in Khmer.) known in the Philippines as Typhoon Queenie, was a large and powerful typhoon that was tied with Typhoon Yutu as the most powerful tropical cyclone worldwide in 2018 in 10 minute sustained windspeeds. The twenty-fifth tropical storm, eleventh typhoon and 6th super typhoon of the 2018 Pacific typhoon season, Kong-rey originated from a tropical disturbance in the open Pacific. For a couple days, it went westward, organizing into a tropical depression on September 27. Then it intensified into a powerful Category 5 super typhoon early on October 2. Kong-rey underwent an eyewall replacement cycle after its peak intensity, causing it to weaken into a Category 3 typhoon under unfavorable conditions. Kong-rey then struck South Korea on October 6 as a tropical storm. Kong-rey transitioned into an extratropical cyclone later that day while impacting Japan.

A total of 3 people were killed by the storm, including 2 people from South Korea. In South Korea, damage nationwide totaled at ₩54.9 billion (US$48.5 million). Although Kong-rey did not make a direct landfall on Kyushu or Shikoku, its outer rainbands affected the two islands. At an area in Shikoku, rain accumulated to 300 mm. In Nagasaki, more than 12,000 families lost power; in Fukuoka Prefecture, a person died because of the rain, mostly due to drowning. Agricultural damage in Okinawa and Miyazaki Prefecture were about JP¥13.99 billion (US$123 million).

== Meteorological history ==
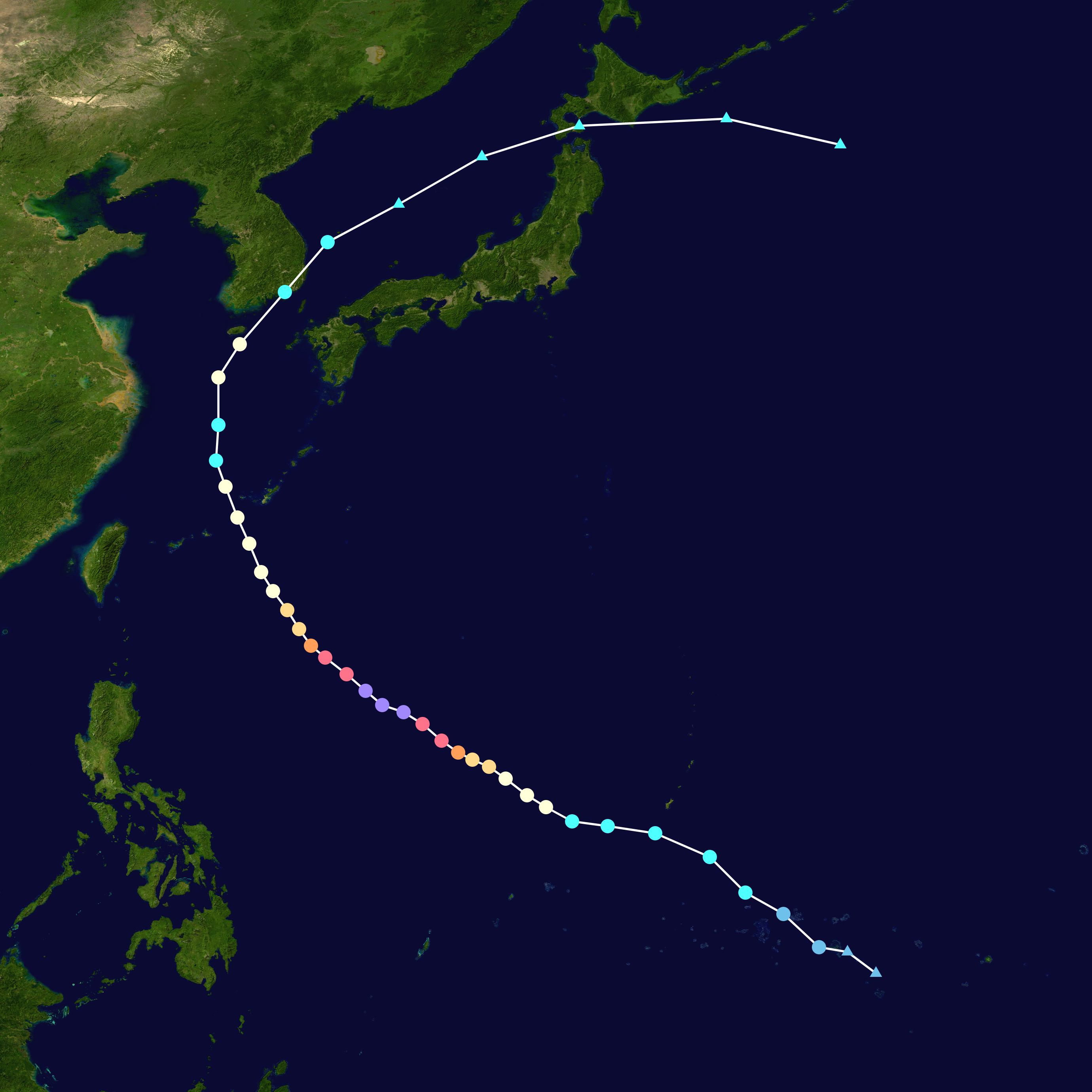
Map plotting the storm's track and intensity, according to the Saffir–Simpson scale Map key Saffir–Simpson scale Tropical depression (≤38 mph, ≤62 km/h) Tropical storm (39–73 mph, 63–118 km/h) Category 1 (74–95 mph, 119–153 km/h) Category 2 (96–110 mph, 154–177 km/h) Category 3 (111–129 mph, 178–208 km/h) Category 4 (130–156 mph, 209–251 km/h) Category 5 (≥157 mph, ≥252 km/h) Unknown Storm type Tropical cyclone Subtropical cyclone Extratropical cyclone, remnant low, tropical disturbance, or monsoon depression

On September 26, a tropical disturbance persisted about 290 km (180 mi) south-southwest of Pohnpei as heavy showers and thunderstorms were developing around the system. The disturbance would later develop into a tropical depression on September 28 and be marked 33W by the Joint Typhoon Warning Center (JTWC), after being over warm sea surface temperatures, which improved consolidation. Moving northwestward, the cumulonimbus clouds accumulated around the center of the system. The poorly organized system later upgraded to a tropical storm on September 29 according to the JTWC and Japan Meteorological Agency (JMA), with the latter assigning it Kong-rey. The formative rainbands wrapped around the atmospheric convection near the obscured low-level circulation center. The central convection then intensified as an eye formation was visible in microwave imaging. By September 30, the JMA upgraded Kong-rey to a severe tropical storm as it tracked west-northwestward along the southwestern periphery of a subtropical high. Kong-rey further intensified to a typhoon that day, and the pinhole eye was later detected on satellite imagery.

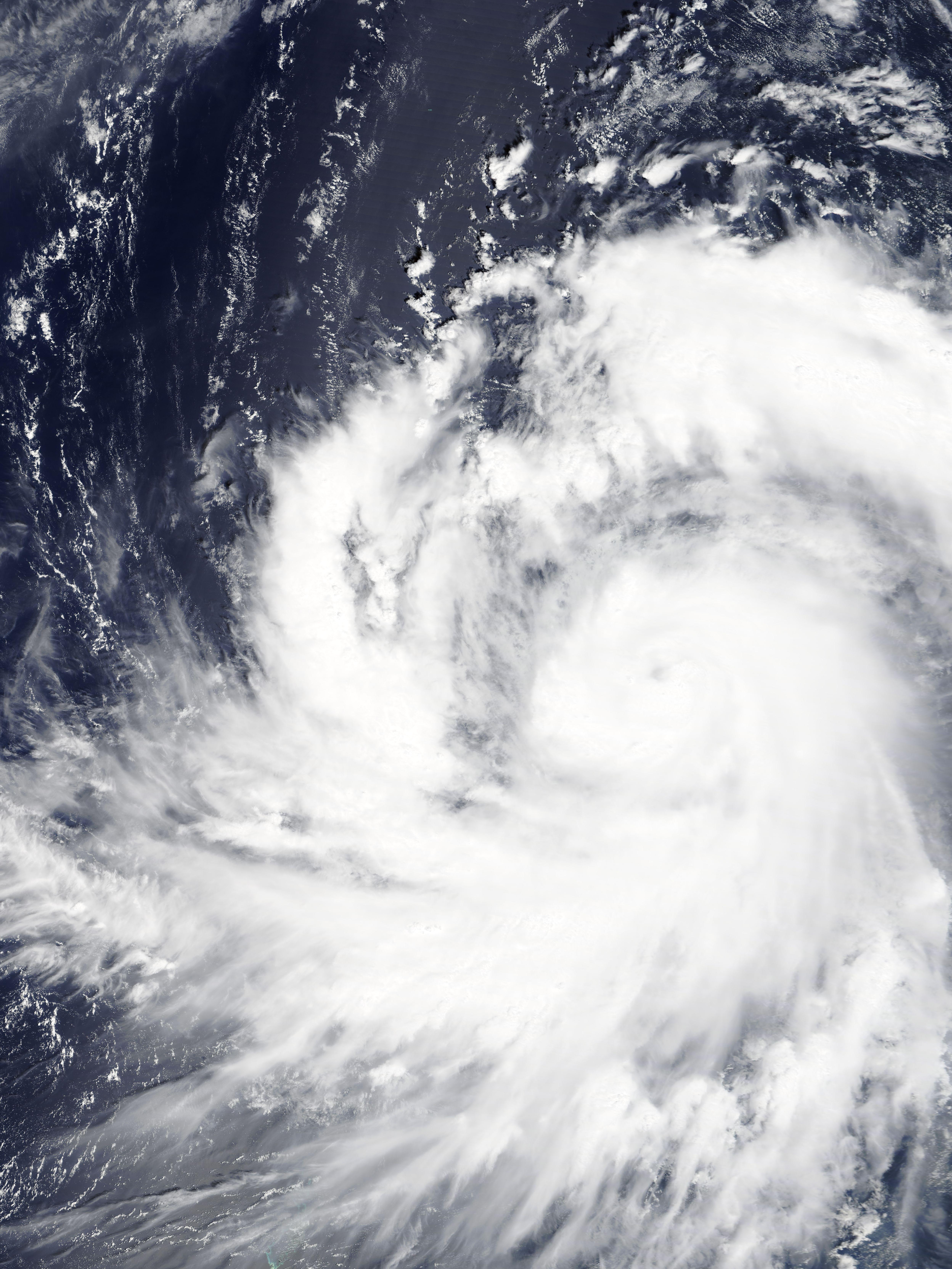
Severe Tropical Storm Kong-rey on September 30

The convective bands continued to deepen on October 1, and Kong-rey would later rapidly intensify to reach 1-minute sustained winds of 230 km/h (145 mph), equivalent to Category 4 strength on the Saffir–Simpson scale. Kong-rey became a Category 5-equivalent super typhoon the same day, reaching its peak intensity with 1-minute sustained winds of 280 km/h (175 mph) along with 10-minute sustained winds of 215 km/h (135 mph) and the lowest central pressure of 900 hPa (26.58 inHg), tying with Typhoon Yutu of being the most intense tropical cyclone in 2018. Unrelated to Kong-rey, Hurricane Walaka was a Category 5 hurricane and Kong-rey had Category 5-equivalent intensity at the same time, marking the first time since 2005 when two tropical cyclones of Category 5 strength existed simultaneously in the Northern Hemisphere. Kong-rey underwent an eyewall replacement cycle the following day and weakened due to it, and cause the deep convection to diminish. However, the storm had excellent equatorward outflow, with a tropical upper tropospheric trough cell contributing by enhancing it.

On October 3, Kong-rey entered a pool of cooler sea surface temperatures caused by upwelling generated by Typhoon Trami, weakening the system. Furthermore, the eye had become less-defined. Kong-rey continued to deteriorate, with initially cold convective cloud tops warming up along with the banding features unraveling, and the eye becoming covered by clouds. The banding became fragmented by October 4, and the rate of disintegration increased after tracking over an area of low ocean heat content and cold dry air, despite being in an area of low wind shear. After passing the Ryukyu Islands, Kong-rey weakened into a tropical storm while steering northward, after convection over the center had greatly reduced. On October 5, Kong-rey steered north-northeastward as a cyclone developed over the storm, which along with a mid-latitude trough, offsets the outflow with high vertical wind shear. Kong-rey accelerated northeastward under the influence of the westerlies on October 6 and began transitioning into an extratropical cyclone, making landfall in Tongyeong, South Gyeongsang Province in South Korea as a high-end tropical storm. The JMA would keep monitoring the cyclone until it had dissipated on October 7.

== Preparations and impact ==
=== Taiwan ===
Kong-rey was closest to Taiwan on the evening of October 4. Many parts of northern Taiwan are affected by their rain belts and strong gusts. The Meteorological Bureau issued special reports on heavy rains in five counties and cities, and also issued special reports on strong winds in 18 counties and cities. Many coastal areas and adjacent sea areas were strongly strengthened by grades 9–11. The gusts hit.

=== Japan ===
As the storm moved towards Japan, the Storm Alert was raised by the Japan Meteorological Agency, which was the highest wind alert raised locally. Kong-rey was an extratropical cyclone when it struck the Okinawa and Miyazaki Prefectures, resulting in agricultural damage of approximately JP¥13.99 billion (US$123 million).

As Kong-rey approached the Ryukyu Islands, more than 200 flights to Japan were cancelled, including 6 flights from Hong Kong to Okinawa. Kong-rey was the second typhoon to hit Okinawa in the same week, bringing strong winds and heavy rain to the local area which resulted in eight injuries and a total of 20,000 households facing power outages.

Although Kong-rey did not directly impact the Kyushu and Shikoku regions, the rainband around it brought heavy rain to both regions. The Shikoku region recorded more than 300 millimeters of rainfall in one day, while approximately 12,000 households in Nagasaki faced power outages. Kong-rey also resulted in the death of an individual in Fukuoka.

=== China ===
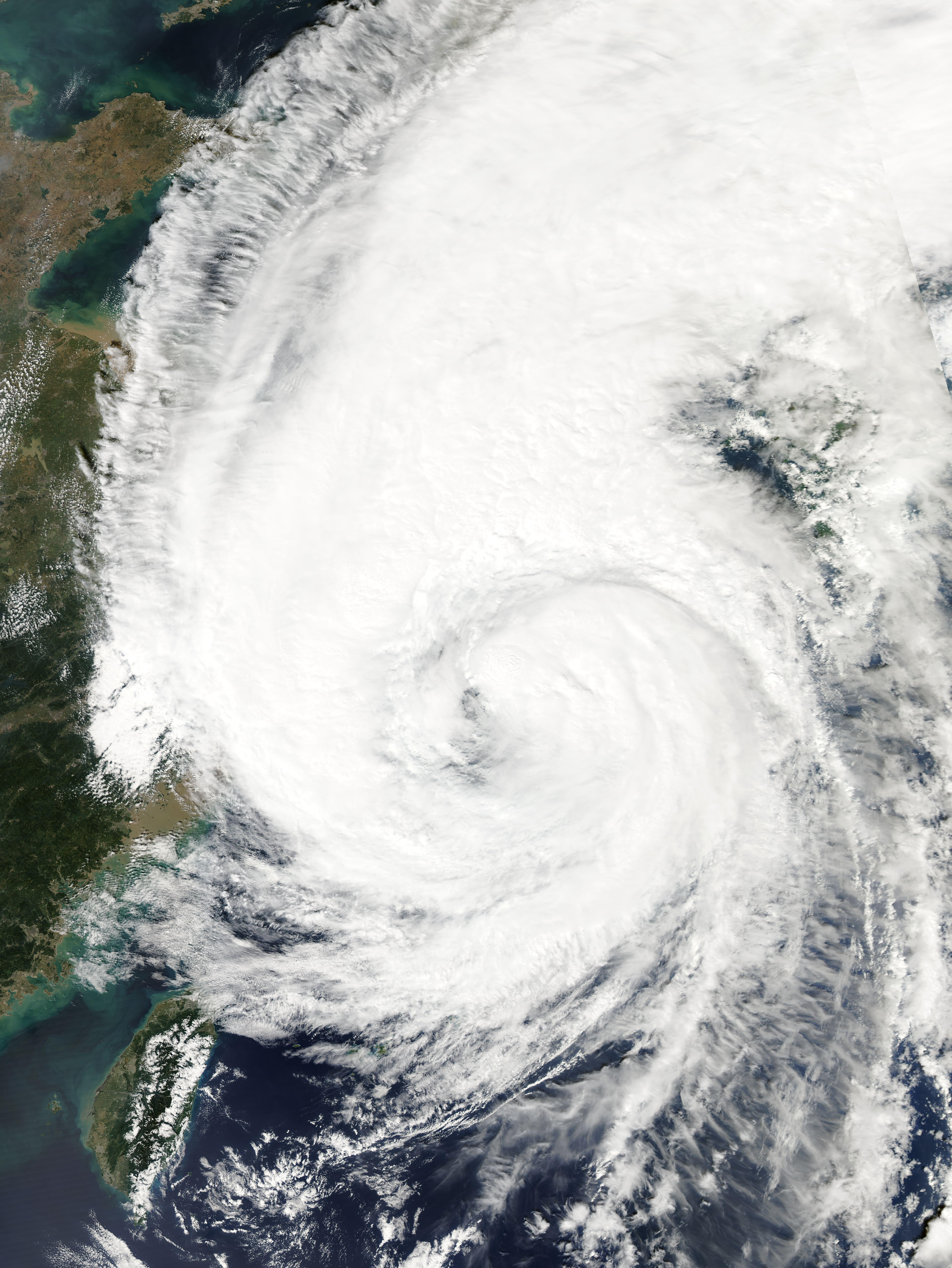
Tropical Storm Kong-rey approaching South Korea on October 5

As Kong-rey entered mainland China, the National Meteorological Center of China issued a typhoon blue warning signal at 18:00 on October 3. The Fujian Provincial Meteorological Observatory issued a typhoon blue warning signal at 11:45 on October 3.

On the evening of October 5, the coastal area of Zhejiang was affected by Kong-rey, and many tourists visited the shore in Shitang Town, Wenling City. As Kong-rey gradually approached Shanghai, the Shanghai Central Meteorological Observatory issued a typhoon blue warning signal at 17:00 on October 4, and the city flood control headquarters launched the city's flood prevention and prevention level IV emergency response.

=== South Korea ===
Kong-rey made landfall in Tongyeong, Gyeongsangnam-do at 9:50 am local time. The storm caused 2 deaths and 1 disappearance in the local area, and a total of 277 flights were canceled to and from the local area. There were severe flooding in Yingde and Pohang in Gyeongsangbuk-do, and more than 30 houses in Busan and Jeju Island were flooded. There were 55,000 power outages in Busan. The national economic loss was 54.9 billion won (a contract of 48.5 million US dollars).

== See also ==
- Other tropical cyclones named Kong-rey
- Weather of 2018
- Tropical cyclones in 2018
- Other tropical cyclones named Queenie
- Typhoon Tip (1979) – A very large tropical cyclone that struck areas affected by Kong-rey
- Typhoon Maemi (2003) – Similar typhoon that struck South Korea
- Typhoon Sanba (2012) – Similar typhoon that struck South Korea and Japan
- Typhoon Trami (2018) – A typhoon that struck Japan before Kong-rey.
