= List of super typhoons =

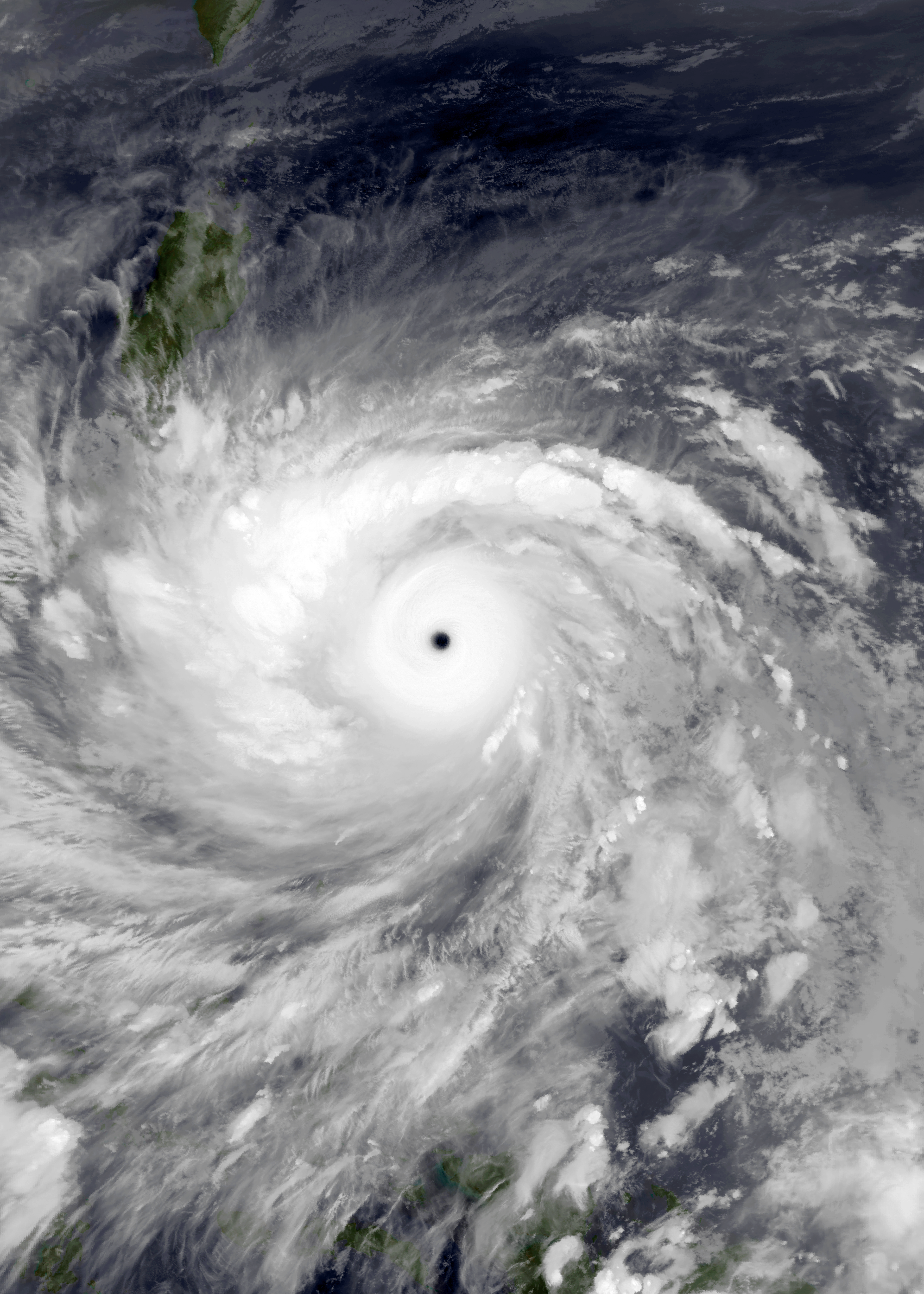
Typhoon Haiyan (Yolanda) on November 7, 2013, approaching the Philippines. One of the strongest Pacific typhoons ever recorded.

Since 1947, the Joint Typhoon Warning Center (JTWC) has classified all typhoons in the Northwestern Pacific Ocean with wind speeds of at least 130 knots (67 m/s; 150 mph; 240 km/h)—the equivalent of a strong Category 4 on the Saffir–Simpson scale, as super typhoons. Since that year, 317 super typhoons have occurred in the basin, the latest being Typhoon Champi in 2026. Only two Pacific typhoon seasons have not included at least one super typhoon, which were the 1949 and the 1974 seasons. The most typhoons to have reached this intensity in a single season is tied between 1965 and 1997, with 11 becoming super typhoons.

== Background ==
All typhoons that reach an intensity of at least 130 knots (150 mph; 240 km/h; 130 kn) are referred to by the Joint Typhoon Warning Center as super typhoons. The first typhoon to be identified as a "super typhoon" by the JTWC was Typhoon Rosalind of 1947, a high-end Category 4-equivalent typhoon. From there on, 4 years later, Typhoon Iris in 1951 would become the first Category 5-equivalent typhoon referred to as a super typhoon ever recorded. Tropical cyclones of these violent intensities occur much more often in the Western Pacific, owing to the fact it has the warmest sea surface temperatures, which tropical cyclones need to thrive. Sufficient sea surface temperatures and the frequent passing of the Madden–Julian oscillation allow these cyclones to quickly intensify and blossom into violent storms.

Since the first super typhoon was designated, approximately 317 other super typhoons have formed to date. The strongest (and also the most intense tropical cyclone ever recorded) was Typhoon Tip in 1979, the costliest (also the costliest typhoon on record) was Typhoon Doksuri in 2023, the longest-lived was Typhoon Rita in 1972, and the deadliest was Typhoon Nina in the extremely deadly 1975 Pacific typhoon season. Additionally, the earliest-forming super typhoon was Typhoon Karen in January 1948.

== Systems ==
Key

- † Discontinuous duration (weakened below super typhoon status before restrengthening)

=== 1947–1959 ===
Name	Dates as a super typhoon (Note: Dates are given in Coordinated Universal Time.)	Duration (hours)	Pressure	Sustained wind speeds	Areas affected	Deaths	Damage (USD)	Notes
Rosalind	October 8–9, 1947	24 hours	918 hPa (27.11 inHg)	240 km/h (150 mph)	None	None	None	First recorded super typhoon
Karen	January 13, 1948	18 hours	936 hPa (27.64 inHg)	240 km/h (150 mph)	None	None	None	First and only super typhoon recorded in the month of January
Doris	May 9–10, 1950	30 hours	922 hPa (27.23 inHg)	240 km/h (150 mph)	None	None	None	
Iris	May 2–3, 1951	24 hours	909 hPa (26.84 inHg)	280 km/h (170 mph)	Chuuk, Philippines	9	$9.3 million	First category 5-equivalent super typhoon
Olive	September 16–17, 1952	42 hours	910 hPa (26.87 inHg)	295 km/h (183 mph)	Wake Island	None	>$1.6 million	
Wilma	October 24–26, 1952	48 hours	914 hPa (26.99 inHg)	295 km/h (183 mph)	Philippines	10	Unknown	
Agnes	November 2–4, 1952	54 hours	920 hPa (27.17 inHg)	280 km/h (170 mph)	None	None	Unknown	
Della	November 26, 1952	18 hours	930 hPa (27.46 inHg)	280 km/h (170 mph)	Philippines, Taiwan	Unknown	Unknown	
Hester	Dec 30, 1952–Jan 1, 1953	60 hours	950 hPa (28.05 inHg)	295 km/h (183 mph)	Guam	None	None	
Kit	June 29-July 1, 1953	60 hours	910 hPa (26.87 inHg)	280 km/h (170 mph)	Taiwan, East China, South Korea	Unknown	Unknown	
Nina	August 11-16, 1953	120 hours	885 hPa (26.13 inHg)	295 km/h (183 mph)	East China	Unknown	Unknown	
Tess	September 21, 1953	12 hours	900 hPa (26.58 inHg)	280 km/h (170 mph)	Japan	Unknown	Unknown	
Betty	October 29, 1953	12 hours	965 hPa (28.50 inHg)	240 km/h (150 mph)	Philippines, Hainan	Unknown	Unknown	
Doris	December 18, 1953	6 hours	935 hPa (27.61 inHg)	280 km/h (170 mph)	None	None	None	
Ida	August 23–24, 1954	24 hours	890 hPa (26.28 inHg)	295 km/h (183 mph)	Philippines, Hainan	Unknown	Unknown	
June	September 7 & 9, 1954	12 hours†	901 hPa (26.61 inHg)	240 km/h (150 mph)	Japan	107	Unknown	
Pamela	November 1–3 & 5, 1954	84 hours†	900 hPa (26.58 inHg)	280 km/h (170 mph)	Philippines, Hong Kong	Unknown	Unknown	One of the first recorded Category 5 typhoons in the South China Sea
Ruby	November 6, 1954	18 hours	940 hPa (27.76 inHg)	270 km/h (170 mph)	Luzon	Unknown	Unknown	
Sally	November 13–17, 1954	108 hours	925 hPa (27.32 inHg)	280 km/h (170 mph)	Luzon	Unknown	Unknown	
Clara	July 10–11, 1955	24 hours	919 hPa (27.14 inHg)	250 km/h (160 mph)	Shandong Province	Unknown	Unknown	
Kate	September 23–24, 1955	24 hours	930 hPa (27.46 inHg)	250 km/h (160 mph)	Luzon	Unknown	Unknown	
Louise	September 25–27, 1955	48 hours	930 hPa (27.46 inHg)	280 km/h (170 mph)	Japan	Unknown	Unknown	
Patsy	December 2, 1955	6 hours	940 hPa (27.76 inHg)	250 km/h (160 mph)	Philippines	None	None	
Ruth	December 15, 1955	36 hours	925 hPa (27.32 inHg)	330 km/h (210 mph)	None	None	None	
Thelma	April 19–21, 1956	48 hours	935 hPa (27.61 inHg)	285 km/h (177 mph)	None	None	None	
Wanda	July 29-August 2, 1956	96 hours	915 hPa (27.02 inHg)	295 km/h (183 mph)	Taiwan, East China	4,935	Unknown	Deadliest typhoon of the 1950s
Emma	September 8–9, 1956	36 hours	930 hPa (27.46 inHg)	250 km/h (160 mph)	Ryukyu Islands	77	$8 million	
Gilda	September 21–22, 1956	24 hours	936 hPa (27.64 inHg)	280 km/h (170 mph)	Philippines, Taiwan	Unknown	Unknown	
Jean	October 20–21, 1956	24 hours	940 hPa (27.76 inHg)	250 km/h (160 mph)	Philippines	Unknown	Unknown	
Rose	January 24, 1957	18 hours	952 hPa (28.11 inHg)	250 km/h (160 mph)	None	None	None	
Virginia	June 21–30, 1957	90 hours	900 hPa (26.58 inHg)	280 km/h (170 mph)	Philippines, Taiwan, East China, Japan	86	$20 million	
Agnes	August 8, 1957	18 hours	905 hPa (26.72 inHg)	250 km/h (160 mph)	Japan, South Korea	Unknown	Unknown	
Faye	September 20, 1957	18 hours	930 hPa (27.46 inHg)	260 km/h (160 mph)	None	None	None	
Hester	October 8, 1957	12 hours	900 hPa (26.58 inHg)	240 km/h (150 mph)	Japan	Unknown	Unknown	
Judy	October 23–24, 1957	24 hours	960 hPa (28.35 inHg)	240 km/h (150 mph)	Japan	Unknown	Unknown	
Lola	November 14–18, 1957	96 hours	900 hPa (26.58 inHg)	295 km/h (183 mph)	None	None	None	
Ophelia	January 13–14, 1958	30 hours	940 hPa (27.76 inHg)	260 km/h (160 mph)	Marshall Islands	None	Minor	
Phyllis	May 26–30, 1958	96 hours	940 hPa (27.76 inHg)	295 km/h (183 mph)	None	None	None	Strongest typhoon in May at the time, before being surpassed by Typhoon Damrey in 2000
Winnie	July 15, 1958	12 hours†	925 hPa (27.32 inHg)	280 km/h (170 mph)	Taiwan	Unknown	Unknown	
Alice	July 19–20, 1958	18 hours	925 hPa (27.32 inHg)	240 km/h (150 mph)	Japan	Unknown	Unknown	
Doris	July 25–27, 1958	48 hours	935 hPa (27.61 inHg)	240 km/h (150 mph)	Japan	Unknown	Unknown	
Grace	September 1–2, 1958	42 hours	905 hPa (26.72 inHg)	305 km/h (190 mph)	East China	Unknown	Unknown	
Helen	September 13–14, 1958	30 hours	920 hPa (27.17 inHg)	280 km/h (170 mph)	Japan	Unknown	Unknown	
Ida	September 23–26, 1958	72 hours	877 hPa (25.90 inHg)	325 km/h (202 mph)	Japan	1,269	$50 million	Most intense Pacific typhoon at the time, before being surpassed by Typhoon June in 1975.
Nancy	November 24–25, 1958	24 hours	920 hPa (27.17 inHg)	260 km/h (160 mph)	None	None	None	
Joan	August 28–30, 1959	48 hours	885 hPa (26.13 inHg)	315 km/h (196 mph)	East China	None	None	
Sarah	September 14–15, 1959	30 hours	905 hPa (26.72 inHg)	305 km/h (190 mph)	East China, South Korea	>2,000	>$102 million	
Vera	September 23–26, 1959	78 hours	895 hPa (26.43 inHg)	305 km/h (190 mph)	Japan	5,098	>$261 million	One of the strongest typhoons to ever strike Japan
Charlotte	October 12–14, 1959	48 hours	905 hPa (26.72 inHg)	270 km/h (170 mph)	Okinawa	46	>$300 thousand	
Dinah	October 17–21, 1959	102 hours	915 hPa (27.02 inHg)	280 km/h (170 mph)	Japan	None	None	
Gilda	December 16–18, 1959	54 hours	925 hPa (27.32 inHg)	280 km/h (170 mph)	Philippines, Vietnam	23	$1.5 million	
51 systems	Jan 13, 1948 – Dec 19, 1959		877 hPa (25.90 inHg)	325 km/h (202 mph)		13,562	$435.7 million	

=== 1960–1969 ===
Name	Dates as a super typhoon	Duration (hours)	Pressure	Sustained wind speeds	Areas affected	Deaths	Damage (USD)	Notes
Shirley	July 30–31, 1960	18 hours	910 hPa (26.87 inHg)	240 km/h (150 mph)	Taiwan, East China	None	None	
Ophelia	December 1–2, 1960	30 hours	928 hPa (27.40 inHg)	240 km/h (150 mph)	Ulithi Atoll, Yap	7	Unknown	First super typhoon name retired
Tess	March 28–29, 1961	30 hours	940 hPa (27.76 inHg)	240 km/h (150 mph)	None	None	None	
Betty	May 22-28, 1961	6 hours	946 hPa (27.94 inHg)	240 km/h (150 mph)	East China, Korean Peninsula, Japan, Russia	None	None	
Pamela	September 11, 1961	18 hours	910 hPa (26.87 inHg)	285 km/h (177 mph)	Taiwan, East China	98 dead, 27 missing	$5 million	
Nancy	September 9–15, 1961	144 hours	882 hPa (26.05 inHg)	345 km/h (214 mph)	Guam, Ryukyu Islands, Japan	202 dead, 8 missing	$500 million	Once considered to have had the strongest wind speeds ever recorded in a tropical cyclone prior to more reliable measurements from Hurricane Patricia
Tilda	September 29–October 2, 1961	54 hours	925 hPa (27.32 inHg)	260 km/h (160 mph)	Ryukyu Islands, East China	2	Unknown	
Violet	October 6–8, 1961	60 hours	895 hPa (26.43 inHg)	335 km/h (208 mph)	Japan	2	None	
Dot	October 9–12, 1961	66 hours	930 hPa (27.46 inHg)	260 km/h (160 mph)	Guam, Northern Mariana Islands	None	Unknown	
Ellen	December 5–14, 1961	12 hours	945 hPa (27.91 inHg)	240 km/h (150 mph)	Philippines	Unknown	$500,000	
Georgia	April 15–24, 1962	18 hours	930 hPa (27.46 inHg)	240 km/h (150 mph)	None	Unknown	$28,000	
Opal	July 30–August 9, 1962	18 hours	900 hPa (26.58 inHg)	270 km/h (170 mph)	East China, Korean Peninsula, Japan	21	$25 million	
Ruth	August 12-23, 1962	48 hours	915 hPa (27.02 inHg)	295 km/h (183 mph)	None	None	None	
Amy	August 28-September 7, 1962	78 hours	940 hPa (27.76 inHg)	260 km/h (160 mph)	Taiwan, China, North Korea, South Korea	24	Unknown	

=== 1970–1979 ===
Name	Dates as a super typhoon	Duration (hours)	Pressure	Sustained wind speeds	Areas affected	Deaths	Damage (USD)	Refs
Olga	June 30-July 1, 1970	24 hours	905 hPa (26.72 inHg)	260 km/h (160 mph)	Japan, South Korea	49	$10 million	
Anita	August 19-August 20, 1970	12 hours	912 hPa (26.93 inHg)	250 km/h (160 mph)	Japan	23	Unknown	
Georgia	September 10-September 11, 1970	48 hours	905 hPa (26.72 inHg)	260 km/h (160 mph)	Philippines, China	95	$1.4 million	
Hope	September 23-September 26, 1970	72 hours	895 hPa (26.43 inHg)	280 km/h (170 mph)	None	None	None	
Joan	October 11-October 13, 1970	36 hours	905 hPa (26.72 inHg)	280 km/h (170 mph)	Philippines, China, Hong Kong	768	$74 million	
Kate	October 18- October 19, 1970	18 hours	940 hPa (27.76 inHg)	240 km/h (150 mph)	Philippines, Indonesia, Vietnam	631	$50 million	
Patsy	November 18- November 19, 1970	42 hours	910 hPa (26.87 inHg)	250 km/h (160 mph)	Philippines, Vietnam	271	$28 million	
Amy	July 18, 1971	18 hours	890 hPa (26.28 inHg)	280 km/h (170 mph)	Philippines, Taiwan, China	240	$450 million	
Lucy	July 19-July 20, 1971	18 hours	910 hPa (26.87 inHg)	240 km/h (150 mph)	Philippines, China, Hong Kong	Unknown	Unknown	
Nadine	July 23-July 25, 1971	42 hours	900 hPa (26.58 inHg)	280 km/h (170 mph)	Taiwan, China	28	Unknown	
Wendy	September 7-September 10, 1971	54 hours	915 hPa (27.02 inHg)	260 km/h (160 mph)	Philippines	None	Unknown	
Bess	September 16-September 18, 1971	42 hours	905 hPa (26.72 inHg)	260 km/h (160 mph)	Taiwan, China	20	$320 million	
Irma	November 11-November 12, 1971	16 hours	884 hPa (26.10 inHg)	285 km/h (177 mph)	Philippines, Taiwan	None	Unknown	
Rita	July 10-July 13, 1972	96 hours	910 hPa (26.87 inHg)	270 km/h (170 mph)	Caroline Islands, Ryukyu Islands, South China	377	$445 million	
Betty	October 2-October 4, 1972	36 hours	910 hPa (26.87 inHg)	250 km/h (160 mph)	Mariana Islands, Philippines, Taiwan, China	29	Unknown	
Billie	July 14-July 15, 1973	12 hours	915 hPa (27.02 inHg)	240 km/h (150 mph)	Philippines, Ryukyu Islands, China	Unknown	Unknown	
Nora	October 4-October 6, 1973	48 hours	875 hPa (25.84 inHg)	295 km/h (183 mph)	Philippines, Taiwan, Eastern China, Hong Kong	40	$2 million	
Patsy	October 8-October 13, 1973	120 hours	895 hPa (26.43 inHg)	260 km/h (160 mph)	Philippine, China, Vietnam	Unknown	Unknown	
Nina	July 30-August 8, 1975	54 hours	924 hPa (27.46 in Hg)	250 km/h (160 mph)	Taiwan, East China	230,000	$1.2 billion	
Elsie	October 11-October 12, 1975	48 hours	900 hPa (26.58 inHg)	250 km/h (160 mph)	Hong Kong	1000	$25 million	
June	November 17-November 21, 1975	96 hours	875 hPa (25.84 inHg)	295 km/h (183 mph)	Caroline Islands, Mariana Islands, Guam	None	$300,000	
Pamela	May 18-May 19, 1976	48 hours	920 hPa (27.17 inHg)	240 km/h (150 mph)	Caroline Islands, Mariana Islands	11	$500 million	
Therese	July 12-July 14, 1976	48 hours	905 hPa (26.72 inHg)	250 km/h (160 mph)	Mariana Islands, Japan	3	Unknown	
Fran	September 7-September 12, 1976	120 hours	910 hPa (26.87 inHg)	240 km/h (150 mph)	Mariana Islands, Japan	169	$660 million	
Louise	October 28-November 2, 1976	120 hours	895 hPa (26.43 inHg)	260 km/h (160 mph)	Caroline Islands, Philippines	None	None	
Tip	October 11-October 17, 1979	168 hours	870 hPa (25.69 inHg)	305 km/h (190 mph)	Caroline Islands, Philippines, Korean Peninsula, Japan, Northeast China, Russian Far East, Alaska	99	$484 million	

=== 1980–1989 ===
Name	Dates as a super typhoon	Duration (hours)	Pressure	Areas affected	Deaths	Damage (USD)	Refs

=== 1990–1999 ===
Name	Dates as a super typhoon	Duration (hours)	Pressure	Areas affected	Deaths	Damage (USD)	Refs

=== 2000–2009 ===
Name	Dates as a super typhoon	Duration (hours)	Pressure	Sustained wind speeds	Areas affected	Deaths	Damage (USD)	Refs
Damrey	May 9–10, 2000	18 hours	930 hPa (27.46 inHg)	285 km/h (177 mph)	Caroline Islands	None	None	
Bilis	August 21–22, 2000	30 hours	920 hPa (27.17 inHg)	260 km/h (160 mph)	Caroline Islands, Philippines, Taiwan, China	71	$668 million	
Saomai	September 10-11, 2000	12 hours	925 hPa (27.32 inHg)	260 km/h (160 mph)	Mariana Islands, Ryukyu Islands, East China, Korea, Russia	28	$6.3 billion	
Shanshan	September 21-22, 2000	24 hours	925 hPa (27.32 inHg)	250 km/h (160 mph)	None	None	None	
Wutip	August 29, 2001	12 hours	930 hPa (27.46 inHg)	240 km/h (150 mph)	None	None	None	
Podul	October 23-26, 2001	66 hours	925 hPa (27.32 inHg)	260 km/h (160 mph)	Caroline Islands	None	None	
Faxai	December 21-23, 2001	36 hours	915 hPa (27.02 inHg)	285 km/h (177 mph)	Caroline Islands, Mariana Islands	1	$1 million	
Mitag	March 4-6, 2002	24 hours	930 hPa (27.46 inHg)	260 km/h (160 mph)	Federated States of Micronesia	2	$150 million	
Hagibis	May 19, 2002	12 hours	935 hPa (27.61 inHg)	260 km/h (160 mph)	Caroline Islands, Mariana Islands	None	None	
Chataan	July 7-8, 2002	12 hours	930 hPa (27.46 inHg)	240 km/h (150 mph)	Chuuk, Guam, Japan	54	$660 million	
Halong	July 13, 2002	6 hours	945 hPa (27.91 inHg)	250 km/h (160 mph)	Guam, Philippines , Japan	10	$89.8 million	
Fengshen	July 17-22, 2002	114 hours	920 hPa (27.17 inHg)	270 km/h (170 mph)	Japan, China	5	$4 million	
Phanfone	August 15-16, 2002	24 hours	940 hPa (27.76 inHg)	250 km/h (160 mph)	Japan	None	None	
Higos	September 29-30, 2002	18 hours	930 hPa (27.46 inHg)	250 km/h (160 mph)	Northern Mariana Islands, Japan, Russian Far East	12	$2.14 billion	
Pongsona	December 08, 2002	6 hours	940 hPa (27.76 inHg)	240 km/h (150 mph)	Guam, Northern Mariana Islands	1	$730 million	
Kujira	April 15-16, 2003	18 hours	930 hPa (27.46 inHg)	250 km/h (160 mph)	Micronesia, Philippines, Taiwan, Japan	3	$230,000	
Imbudo	July 20-21, 2003	18 hours	935 hPa (27.61 inHg)	240 km/h (150 mph)	Philippines, China	85	$383 million	
Maemi	September 9-10 & 11 ,2003	42 hours	910 hPa (26.87 inHg)	280 km/h (170 mph)	Miyako-jima, Okinawa, Taiwan, South Korea, North Korea	120	$4.8 billion	
Parma	October 24, 2003	12 hours	940 hPa (27.76 inHg)	240 km/h (150 mph)	None	None	None	
Dianmu	June 15-17, 2004	42 hours	915 hPa (27.02 inHg)	285 km/h (177 mph)	Caroline Islands, Palau, Japan, South Korea, Philippines	6	$68.5 million	

=== 2010–2019 ===
Name	Dates as a super typhoon	Duration (hours)	Pressure	Sustained wind speeds	Areas affected	Deaths	Damage (USD)	Refs
Megi	October 17–18, 2010	30 hours	885 hPa (26.13 inHg)	295 km/h (183 mph)	Philippines, Southeastern China, Taiwan	69	$709 million	
Songda	May 16, 2011	30 hours	920 hPa (27.17 inHg)	260 km/h (160 mph)	Micronesia, Philippines, Japan	17	$287 million	
Muifa	July 30, 2011	6 hours	930 hPa (27.46 inHg)	260 km/h (160 mph)	Micronesia, Philippines, Taiwan, Japan, China, South Korea, North Korea, Russia	22	$480 million	
Nanmadol	August 26–27, 2011	24 hours	925 hPa (27.32 inHg)	260 km/h (160 mph)	Philippines, Taiwan, China,	38	$1.49 billion	
Nalgae	September 30, 2011	12 hours	935 hPa (27.61 inHg)	240 km/h (150 mph)	Philippines, China, Vietnam	18	$250 million	
Guchol	June 17, 2012	12 hours	935 hPa (27.61 inHg)	240 km/h (150 mph)	Philippines, Japan	3	$100 million	
Sanba	September 13-14, 2012	27 hours	900 hPa (26.58 inHg)	285 km/h (177 mph)	Palau, Japan, Korea, China, Russia	6	$361 million	
Jelawat	September 23-28, 2012	111 hours	905 hPa (26.72 inHg)	260 km/h (160 mph)	Japan, Philippines, Taiwan, Alaska, Russian Far East	2	$27.4 million	
Bopha	December 2, 2012 & December 3-4, 2012	30 hours	930 hPa (27.46 inHg)	280 km/h (170 mph)	Caroline Islands, Philippines	1,901	$1.16 billon	
Utor	August 8, 2013	3 hours	925 hPa (27.32 inHg)	240 km/h (150 mph)	Philippines, Hong Kong, Macao, Guangdong, Guangxi, Jiangxi, Hunan	97	$3.55 billion	
Usagi	September 19-21, 2013	30 hours	910 hPa (26.87 inHg)	250 km/h (160 mph)	Philippines, Taiwan, China, Hong Kong, Macau	39	$4.32 billion	
Francisco	October 18-20, 2013	42 hours	920 hPa (27.17 inHg)	260 km/h (160 mph)	Guam, Ryukyu Islands, Japan	None	$150,000	
Lekima	October 22-24, 2013	42 hours	905 hPa (26.72 inHg)	260 km/h (160 mph)	Northern Mariana Islands, Japan	None	None	
Haiyan	November 6-8, 2013	66 hours	895 hPa (26.43 inHg)	315 km/h (196 mph)	Caroline Islands, Philippines, South China, Vietnam, Taiwan	6,352	$2.98 billion	
Neoguri	July 6-7, 2014	15 hours	930 hPa (27.46 inHg)	260 km/h (160 mph)	Caroline Islands, Guam, Japan, South Korea	3	$632 million	
Rammasun	July 18, 2014	9 hours	935 hPa (27.61 inHg)	260 km/h (160 mph)	Caroline Islands, Mariana Islands, Philippines, South China, Hong Kong, Macau, Vietnam, Thailand	225	$8.08 billion	
Halong	August 2–3, 2014	27 hours	920 hPa (27.17 inHg)	260 km/h (160 mph)	Caroline Islands, Mariana Islands, Philippines, Japan, Russia	12	$72.8 million	
Genevieve	August 7–8, 2014	33 hours	915 hPa (27.02 inHg)	260 km/h (160 mph)	None	None	None	
Phanfone	October 4, 2014	6 hours	935 hPa (27.61 inHg)	250 km/h (160 mph)	Mariana Islands, Japan, Alaska	11	$100 million	
Vongfong	October 7–9, 2014	57 hours	900 hPa (26.58 inHg)	285 km/h (177 mph)	Caroline Islands, Mariana Islands, Philippines, Taiwan, Japan, South Korea, Kamchatka Peninsula, Alaska	9	$161 million	
Nuri	November 2–4, 2014	42 hours	910 hPa (26.87 inHg)	285 km/h (177 mph)	Japan	None	Minimal	
Hagupit	December 3–5, 2014	48 hours	905 hPa (26.72 inHg)	285 km/h (177 mph)	Caroline Islands, Palau, Philippines, Vietnam	18	$114 million	
Higos	February 10, 2015	6 hours	940 hPa (27.76 inHg)	240 km/h (150 mph)	None	None	None	
Maysak	March 31 – April 1, 2015	42 hours	910 hPa (26.87 inHg)	280 km/h (170 mph)	Federated States of Micronesia, Philippines	5	$8.5 million	
Noul	May 9–10, 2015	24 hours	920 hPa (27.17 inHg)	260 km/h (160 mph)	Caroline Islands, Philippines, Taiwan, Japan	2	$23.8 million	
Dolphin	May 16, 2015	24 hours	925 hPa (27.32 inHg)	260 km/h (160 mph)	Caroline Islands, Mariana Islands, Kamchatka Peninsula, Alaska	1	$13.5 million	
Nangka	July 9, 2015	18 hours	925 hPa (27.32 inHg)	250 km/h (160 mph)	Marshall Islands, Mariana Islands, Japan	2	$209 million	
Soudelor	August 3–4, 2015	30 hours	900 hPa (26.58 inHg)	285 km/h (177 mph)	Mariana Islands, Philippines, Taiwan, China, South Korea, Japan	59	$4.09 billion	
Atsani	August 19–20, 2015	36 hours	925 hPa (27.32 inHg)	260 km/h (160 mph)	Mariana Islands	None	None	
Dujuan	September 27, 2015	6 hours	925 hPa (27.32 inHg)	240 km/h (150 mph)	Ryukyu Islands, Taiwan, East China	3	$406 million	
Koppu	October 17, 2015	6 hours	925 hPa (27.32 inHg)	240 km/h (150 mph)	Northern Mariana Islands, Philippines, Taiwan, Ryukyu Islands	62	$948 million	
Nepartak	July 5–7, 2016	48 hours	900 hPa (26.58 inHg)	285 km/h (177 mph)	Caroline Islands, Mariana Islands, Philippines, Ryukyu Islands, Taiwan, East China	111	$1.89 billion	
Meranti	September 12-14, 2016	48 hours	890 hPa (26.28 inHg)	315 km/h (196 mph)	Mariana Islands, Philippines, China, Taiwan	47	$4.79 billion	
Chaba	October 3, 2016	24 hours	905 hPa (26.72 inHg)	280 km/h (170 mph)	Mariana Islands, South Korea, Japan, Russian Far East	10	$129 million	
Songda	October 11, 2016	6 hours	925 hPa (27.32 inHg)	240 km/h (150 mph)	Pacific Northwest	None	Unknown	
Haima	October 18–19, 2016	39 hours	900 hPa (26.58 inHg)	270 km/h (170 mph)	Caroline Islands, Philippines, Taiwan, China, Japan	19	$972 million	
Nock-ten	December 24–25, 2016	18 hours	915 hPa (27.02 inHg)	260 km/h (160 mph)	Caroline Islands, Philippines, Vietnam	13	$123 million	
Noru	July 30–31, 2017	18 hours	935 hPa (27.61 inHg)	250 km/h (160 mph)	Japan	2	$100 million	
Lan	October 20–21, 2017	30 hours	915 hPa (27.02 inHg)	250 km/h (160 mph)	Caroline Islands, Philippines, Japan, South Korea	17	$2 billion	
Jelawat	March 30, 2018	6 hours	915 hPa (27.02 inHg)	240 km/h (150 mph)	Caroline Islands, Mariana Islands	2	Unknown	
Maria	July 6 & 8–9, 2018	54 hours	915 hPa (27.02 inHg)	270 km/h (170 mph)	Mariana Islands, Ryukyu Islands, Taiwan, China	2	$673 million	
Jebi	August 30 – September 1, 2018	48 hours	915 hPa (27.02 inHg)	285 km/h (177 mph)	Northern Mariana Islands, Taiwan, Japan, Russian Far East	21	$14 billion	
Mangkhut	September 11–14, 2018	90 hours	905 hPa (26.72 inHg)	285 km/h (177 mph)	Guam, Northern Mariana Islands, Philippines, Malaysia, Taiwan, Hong Kong, Macau, China, Vietnam, Japan	134	$3.77 billion	
Trami	September 24–25, 2018	30 hours	915 hPa (27.02 inHg)	260 km/h (160 mph)	Mariana Islands, Taiwan, Japan, Russian Far East, Alaska	4	$2.69 billion	
Kong-rey	October 1–2, 2018	30 hours	900 hPa (26.58 inHg)	280 km/h (170 mph)	Federated States of Micronesia, Japan, South Korea, East China, Taiwan	3	$171.5 million	
Yutu	October 24–28, 2018	108 hours	900 hPa (26.58 inHg)	280 km/h (170 mph)	Caroline Islands, Northern Mariana Islands, Philippines, South China	30	$855 million	
Wutip	February 23 & 25, 2019	26 hours†	920 hPa (27.17 inHg)	270 km/h (170 mph)	Guam, Federated States of Micronesia, Northern Mariana Islands	None	$3.3 million	
Lekima	August 8, 2019	18 hours	925 hPa (27.32 inHg)	250 km/h (160 mph)	Caroline Islands, East China, Philippines, Ryukyu Islands, Taiwan, Malaysia	105	$9.28 billion	
Hagibis	October 7–10, 2019	66 hours†	915 hPa (27.02 inHg)	295 km/h (183 mph)	Mariana Islands, Japan, Russia, Alaska	99	$15 billion	
Bualoi	October 22, 2019	12 hours	935 hPa (27.61 inHg)	260 km/h (160 mph)	Caroline Islands, Mariana Islands	13	$200 million	
Halong	November 5–6, 2019	30 hours	905 hPa (26.72 inHg)	305 km/h (190 mph)	None	None	None	

=== 2020–2026 ===
Name	Dates as a super typhoon	Duration (hours)	Pressure	Sustained wind speeds	Areas affected	Deaths	Damage (USD)	Refs
Haishen	September 4, 2020	24 hours	910 hPa (26.87 inHg)	250 km/h (155 mph)	Mariana Islands, Japan, Korean Peninsula	4	$100 million	
Goni	October 30 – November 9, 2020	54 hours	905 hPa (26.72 inHg)	315 km/h (195 mph)	Philippines, Vietnam	26	$392 million	
Surigae	April 16–18, 2021	48 hours	895 hPa (26.43 inHg)	315 km/h (195 mph)	Caroline Islands, Palau, Sulawesi, Philippines	10	$10.5 million	
Chanthu	September 8–9 & 10–11, 2021	48 hours	905 hPa (26.72 inHg)	285 km/h (180 mph)	Philippines, Taiwan, Eastern China, Japan	None	$748,000	
Rai	December 16 & 18, 2021	12 hours	915 hPa (27.02 inHg)	280 km/h (175 mph)	Caroline Islands, Palau, Philippines, Spratly Islands, Vietnam, South China, Hong Kong, Macau	410	$1.02 billion	
Hinnamnor	August 30–31 & September 1, 2022	27 hours	920 hPa (27.17 inHg)	270 km/h (165 mph)	Japan, Philippines, Taiwan, East China, South Korea, North Korea, Russian Far East	12	$1.81 billion	
Nanmadol	September 16-17, 2022	18 hours	910 hPa (26.87 inHg)	250 km/h (155 mph)	Japan, South Korea	6	$2 billion	
Noru	September 25, 2022	9 hours	940 hPa (27.76 inHg)	270 km/h (165 mph)	Philippines, Vietnam, Laos, Thailand, Cambodia	40	$313 million	
Mawar	May 23 & May 25-27, 2023	60 hours	900 hPa (26.58 inHg)	305 km/h (190 mph)	Federated States of Micronesia, Guam, Northern Mariana Islands	6	$4.3 billion	
Doksuri	July 25, 2023	9 hours	925 hPa (27.32 inHg)	240 km/h (150 mph)	Philippines, Taiwan, China, Vietnam	137	$28.5 billion	
Saola	August 29–31, 2023	45 hours	920 hPa (27.17 inHg)	260 km/h (160 mph)	Hong Kong, Macau, South China, Philippines, Taiwan	3	$545 million	
Bolaven	October 10–12, 2023	30 hours	905 hPa (26.72 inHg)	305 km/h (190 mph)	Northern Mariana Islands, Guam	None	None	
Yagi	September 5–6, 2024	24 hours	915 hPa (27.02 inHg)	270 km/h (170 mph)	Philippines, China, Vietnam	844	$14.7 billion	
Krathon	September 30 – October 1, 2024	12 hours	920 hPa (27.17 inHg)	250 km/h (155 mph)	Philippines, Taiwan	18	$48.1 million	
Kong-rey	October 29–30, 2024	12 hours	925 hPa (27.32 inHg)	260 km/h (160 mph)	Philippines, Taiwan	3	$167 million	
Yinxing	November 7, 2024	6 hours	945 hPa (27.91 inHg)	240 km/h (150 mph)	Philippines, Vietnam	1	$9.63 million	
Man-yi	November 15-16 & 17, 2024	18 hours	920 hPa (27.17 inHg)	260 km/h (160 mph)	Philippines	14	$65 million	
Usagi	November 11, 2024	12 hours	940 hPa (27.76 inHg)	240 km/h (150 mph)	Philippines, Taiwan	0	$9.56 - 73.78 million	
Ragasa	September 21, 2025	24 hours	905 hPa (26.72 inHg)	270 km/h (170 mph)	Philippines, Hong Kong, China, Taiwan, Macau	40	$2.86 billion	
Sinlaku	April 12–14, 2026	48 hours	905 hPa (26.72 inHg)	295 km/h (185 mph)	Guam, Micronesia, Northern Mariana Islands	31	>$1.55 billion	
Bavi	July 3–6, & July 7–8, 2026	90 hours	900 hPa (26.58 inHg)	285 km/h (175 mph)	Marshall Islands, Guam, Northern Mariana Islands	23	>$141 million	
Dolphin	July 29–31, 2026	42 hours	915 hPa (27.02 inHg)	280 km/h (175 mph)	Marshall Islands, Ryukyu Islands, Taiwan, East China, Philippines	(6)	>$5.02 million	
Surigae	September 27, 2026	6 hours	945 hPa (27.91 inHg)	240 km/h (150 mph)	Mariana Islands, Ryukyu Islands	None	Unknown	
Choi-wan	October 4–5, 2026	12 hours	925 hPa (27.32 inHg)	260 km/h (160 mph)	Mariana Islands, Bonin Islands	None	Unknown	
Champi	October 17–18, 19 & 20–22, 2026	60 hours	900 hPa (26.58 inHg)	295 km/h (185 mph)	Micronesia, Mariana Islands, Philippines, Taiwan, Ryukyu Islands	None	Unknown	
In-fa	October 28 & 29–30, 2026	18 hours	940 hPa (27.76 inHg)	240 km/h (150 mph)	Marshall Islands	None	Unknown	

== See also ==
- List of violent typhoons
- Typhoon
- Pacific typhoon season
- 2026 Pacific typhoon season
