= Typhoon Malakas (2016) =

Pacific typhoon in 2016

Typhoon Malakas (Gener)
- Malakas at peak intensity and nearing Taiwan on September 16

Meteorological history
- Formed: September 11, 2016
- Extratropical: September 20, 2016
- Dissipated: September 23, 2016

Very strong typhoon
- 10-minute sustained (JMA)
- Highest winds: 175 km/h (110 mph)
- Lowest pressure: 930 hPa (mbar); 27.46 inHg

Category 4-equivalent typhoon
- 1-minute sustained (SSHWS/JTWC)
- Highest winds: 215 km/h (130 mph)
- Lowest pressure: 937 hPa (mbar); 27.67 inHg

Overall effects
- Fatalities: 1
- Damage: $300 million (2016 USD)
- Areas affected: Mariana Islands, Taiwan, Japan
- IBTrACS
- Part of the 2016 Pacific typhoon season

Typhoon Malakas, (Note: The name Malakas (Tagalog: malakas, [mɐlɐˈkas]) was contributed by the Philippines and means "to be strong, powerful" in Tagalog.) known in the Philippines as Typhoon Gener, was a powerful tropical cyclone which affected Taiwan and Japan in mid September 2016. It was the sixteenth named storm and the sixth typhoon of the annual typhoon season in 2016. Malakas formed on September 11, just south of Guam. The system gradually organized and improved its outer bands, which prompted JTWC to give its identifier as Tropical Depression 18W. A few hours later, JMA received its name Malakas for 18W. On September 13, Malakas entered the Philippine Area of Responsibility, which gained the name Gener by PAGASA. Despite its marginal conditions for further development, Malakas continued to intensify into a typhoon.

On September 16, Malakas now on a very favorable development, which allowed the typhoon to upgrade into Category-2. After maintaining its intensity, Malakas intensified into a Category-4 typhoon as well-defined eye circulation popped out. Shortly after it reached its peak intensity, Malakas started to gradually weaken, downgraded back to Category-2 typhoon. However, Malakas gained strength again and attained to Category-3 major typhoon before it made landfall on Ōsumi Peninsula in Japan. It crossed through Cape Muroto and made another landfall over Tanabe. Malakas would transition into an extratropical cyclone before formally dissipating on September 23.

== Meteorological history ==
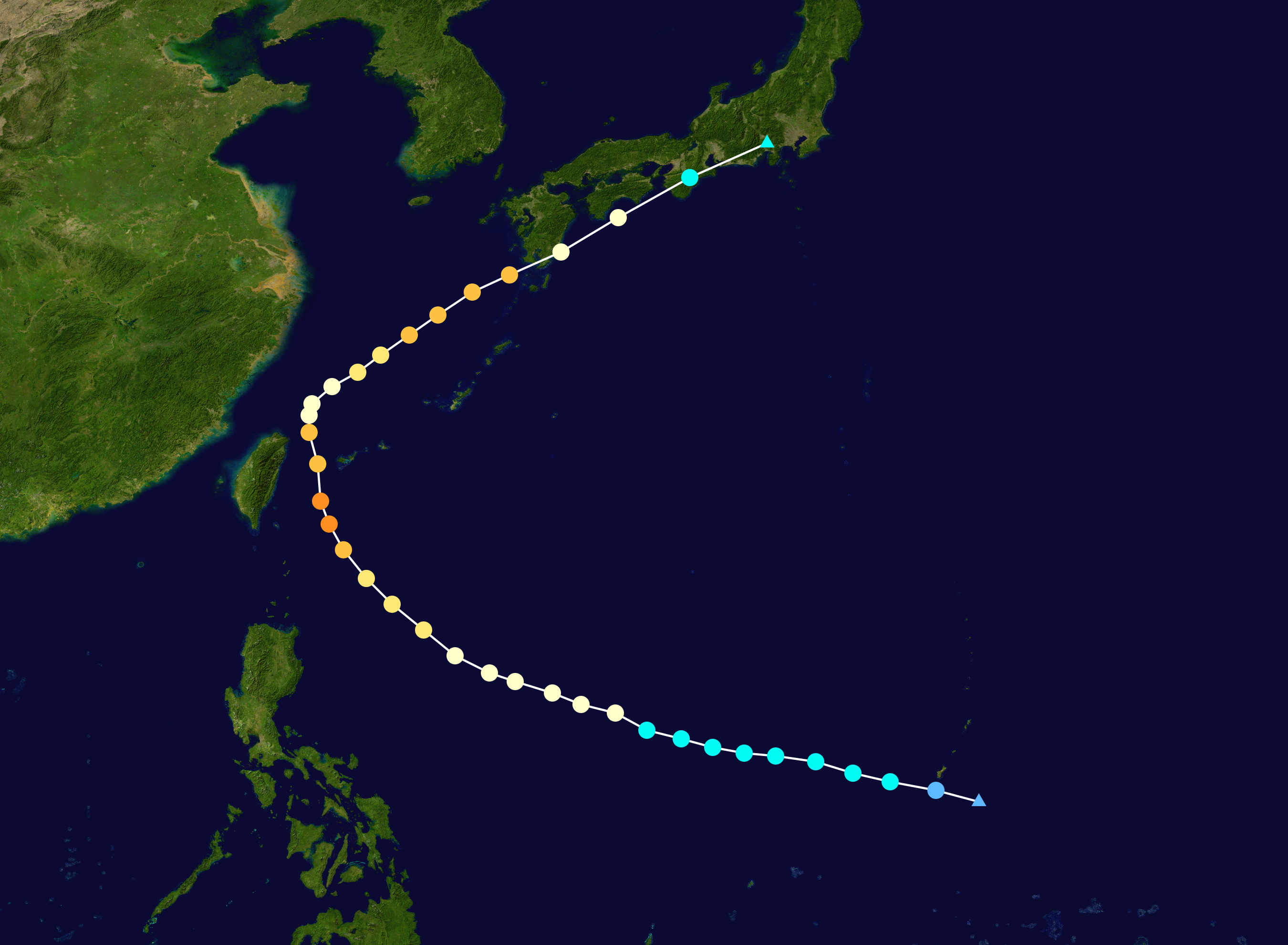
Map plotting the storm's track and intensity, according to the Saffir–Simpson scale Map key Saffir–Simpson scale Tropical depression (≤38 mph, ≤62 km/h) Tropical storm (39–73 mph, 63–118 km/h) Category 1 (74–95 mph, 119–153 km/h) Category 2 (96–110 mph, 154–177 km/h) Category 3 (111–129 mph, 178–208 km/h) Category 4 (130–156 mph, 209–251 km/h) Category 5 (≥157 mph, ≥252 km/h) Unknown Storm type Tropical cyclone Subtropical cyclone Extratropical cyclone, remnant low, tropical disturbance, or monsoon depression

During September 11, both the JMA and the JTWC started to monitor Tropical Depression 18W approximately 58 km (36 mi) south of Hagåtña, Guam. Due to decent organization and improved banding, JTWC upgraded 18W to a tropical storm. 18W was fully upgraded to a named tropical storm by the JMA few hours later and was named Malakas. By September 13, Malakas had improved in its organization and was already strengthening with deep convection wrapping into its LLCC; the JMA upgraded Malakas to a severe tropical storm thereafter. In the same time, Malakas had entered the Philippine area of Responsibility, with PAGASA assigning the local name Gener. Later, it was reported that Malakas was located in marginal conditions for further development due to wind shear caused by the proximity of the outflow of Typhoon Meranti. However the JMA upgraded Malakas to a typhoon three hours later. With improving conditions, it was reported that a cold dense overcast was forming and the JTWC upgraded Malakas to a Category 1 typhoon during the next day.

By September 15, Malakas was over in very favorable conditions of Sea surface temperature (SSTs) of nearly 30 °C (86 °F) and was later upgraded to a Category 2 typhoon. After maintaining this intensity for six hours, satellite imagery depicted an improved deep convection and a well-defined 10 nmi (19 km; 12 mi) eye feature, as Malakas rapidly intensified into a Category 4 typhoon. Malakas reached its peak intensity with 1-minute sustained winds of 215 km/h (134 mph) and a minimum pressure of 930 hPa (27 inHg). The JMA had 10-minute sustained winds of 175 km/h (109 mph) on midnight of September 17. Shortly thereafter, its eye became cloud-filled and ragged and weakened to a Category 3 typhoon. Later in that same day, Malakas further weakened to a Category 2 as satellite imagery depicted warming cloud tops, decreasing convection and SSTs of only around 28 °C (82 °F). However, by September 18, Malakas started to re-intensify as it moved east-northeastward. Malakas reached its secondary peak intensity on September 19, but only as a Category 3 typhoon. Malakas then started to weaken due to land interaction with Japan. On September 20, the JTWC downgraded Malakas to a tropical storm, while the JMA downgraded it to a severe tropical storm, because at around 00:00 JST on September 20 (15:00 UTC on September 19), Malakas made landfall over the Ōsumi Peninsula in Japan. It subsequently crossed Cape Muroto at around 11:00 JST (02:00 UTC) and made landfall over Tanabe at around 13:30 JST (04:30 UTC). Both agencies issued their final advisory later that day as it became extratropical.

== Impact ==
=== Taiwan ===
Malakas passed about 81 mi (130 km) to the east of Taipei on September 17, producing heavy rain and strong winds to northern Taiwan. Meanwhile, Taitung City was affected by Foehn wind. At 15:11 TST (07:11 UTC), a weather station recorded the temperature of 36.1 °C (97.0 °F). Overall, damages from Malakas to Taiwan was minimal.

=== Japan ===
Malakas passed over the Yaeyama Islands on September 17, producing heavy rain and hurricane-force winds, especially in Taketomi. Malakas also caused widespread damage to the Japanese archipelago, Yamakawa Station to Makurazaki Station of the Ibusuki Makurazaki Line have to be closed due to falling trees. In Nobeoka City, the recorded rainfall on September 20 during the previous 24 hours was 444.5 mm (17.50 in). Heavy rains caused flooding to these areas. In Tokushima Prefecture, the weather station also recorded the rainfall of 85.5 mm (3.37 in). Malakas also brought heavy rains to Kansai region. In Sumoto City, the weather station recorded the rainfall of 85.5 mm (3.37 in) in 1 hour. Agricultural damage were about JP¥26.18 billion (US$257 million). Overall damage nationwide were at US$300 million.

== See also ==
- Weather of 2016
- Tropical cyclones in 2016
- Typhoon Jelawat (2012)
- Typhoon Neoguri (2014)
- Typhoon Vongfong (2014)
