= Typhoon Sanba =

Pacific typhoon in 2012

Typhoon Sanba (Karen)
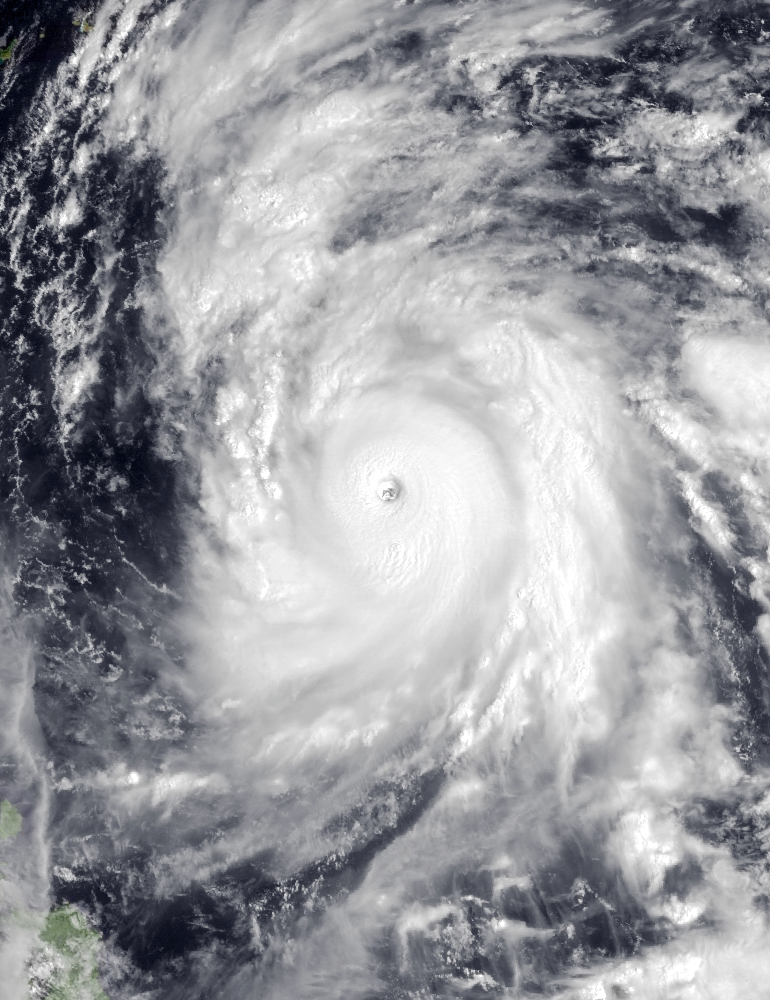
- Typhoon Sanba at peak intensity on September 14

Meteorological history
- Formed: September 10, 2012
- Extratropical: September 18, 2012
- Dissipated: September 19, 2012

Violent typhoon
- 10-minute sustained (JMA)
- Highest winds: 205 km/h (125 mph)
- Lowest pressure: 900 hPa (mbar); 26.58 inHg

Category 5-equivalent super typhoon
- 1-minute sustained (SSHWS/JTWC)
- Highest winds: 285 km/h (180 mph)
- Lowest pressure: 907 hPa (mbar); 26.78 inHg

Overall effects
- Fatalities: 6
- Damage: $361 million (2012 USD)
- Areas affected: Philippines, Japan, Korea, Russia
- IBTrACS
- Part of the 2012 Pacific typhoon season

Typhoon Sanba, (Note: The name Sanba (Mandarin: 三巴, [sän˥ pä˥]) was contributed by Macau and refers to the Ruins of Saint Paul's in Mandarin.) known in the Philippines as Typhoon Karen, was the strongest tropical cyclone worldwide in 2012. The sixteenth named storm and tenth typhoon of the annual typhoon season, Sanba formed as a tropical depression east of the Philippines on September 10. The storm gradually intensified as it moved generally northward in an area favorable for tropical development. The system was soon upgraded to a tropical storm less than a day after formation and subsequently further to a typhoon on September 12.

Later that day, Sanba entered a phase of rapid intensification, and quickly strengthened. On September 13, the system attained its peak intensity with maximum sustained winds of 125 mph (205 km/h), (Note: All winds are in ten-minute sustained standards, as per the Japan Meteorological Agency, unless otherwise stated.) and a barometric pressure of 900 mbar (hPa; 26.58 inHg), becoming the strongest typhoon in the Western Pacific Ocean since Megi in 2010. Accelerating towards more northerly latitudes, a period of gradual weakening ensued afterwards as its eye expanded. It made landfall on South Korea late on September 17 as a typhoon before transitioning into an extratropical cyclone the following day. Sanba's remnants tracked into the Primorsky Krai region of eastern Russia before they were last noted on September 19.

Passing just to the west of Japan, Sanba caused extensive losses to agriculture, forestry, and fishing industries on the islands of Okinawa Prefecture. Further inland on Kōchi and Gifu Prefectures, heavy rains damaged agricultural regions and washed out numerous roads. Losses on both prefectures totalled to ¥2.5 billion (US$31.8 million). (Note: All monetary values are based on the value of its respective currency during 2012.) Upon its landfall on the Korean Peninsula on September 17, it became the first time in 50 years that the peninsula had been struck by at least four typhoons in a single year. In South Korea, torrential rainfall also washed out road systems and inundated crop land, as well as damaged infrastructure. Losses there associated with Sanba totaled to ₩365.7 billion (US$328 million). In North Korea, the heavy precipitation worsened preexisting flood conditions initially started by Tropical Storm Khanun two months prior. In all, the typhoon killed six people and caused US$361 million in losses.

== Meteorological history ==
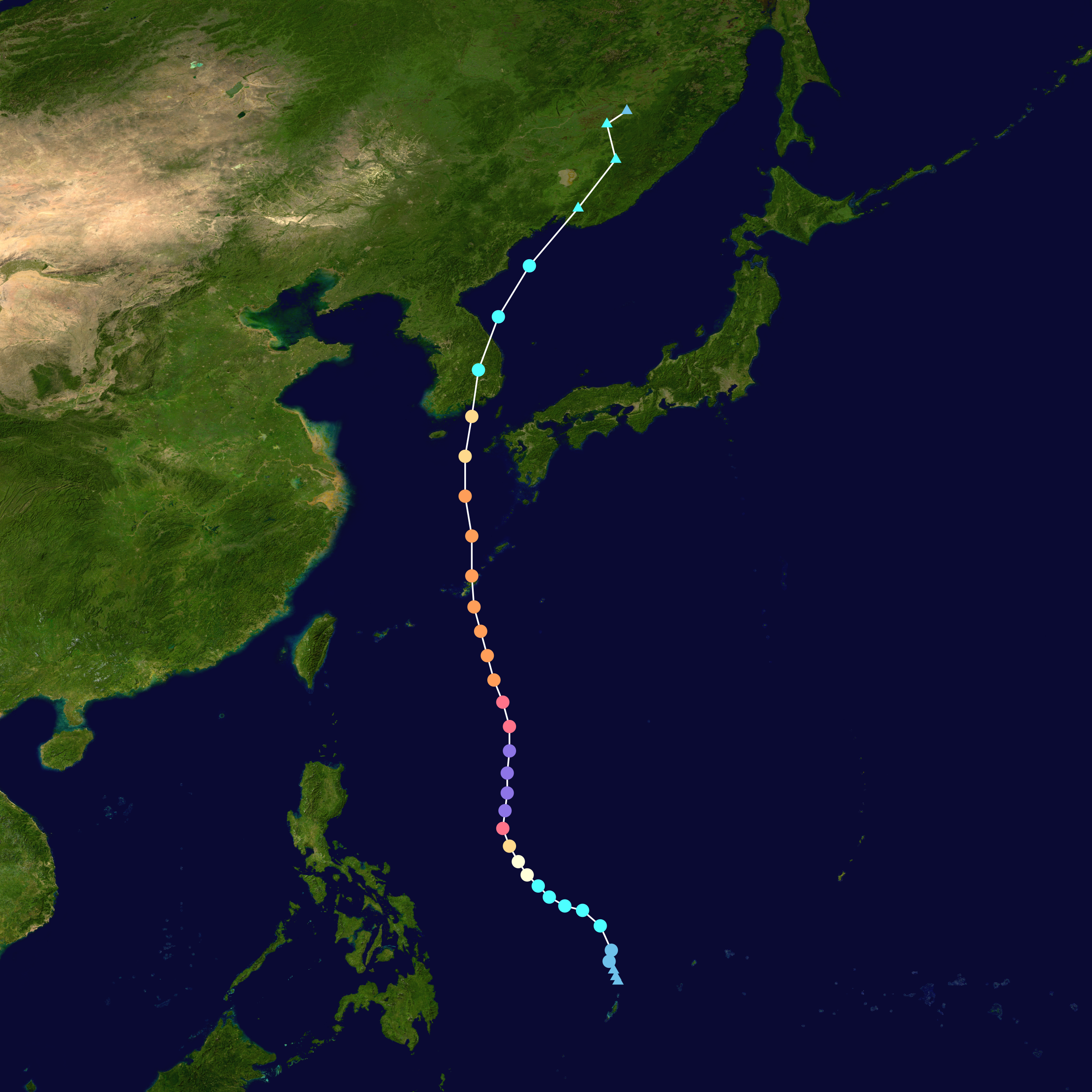
Map plotting the storm's track and intensity, according to the Saffir–Simpson scale Map key Saffir–Simpson scale Tropical depression (≤38 mph, ≤62 km/h) Tropical storm (39–73 mph, 63–118 km/h) Category 1 (74–95 mph, 119–153 km/h) Category 2 (96–110 mph, 154–177 km/h) Category 3 (111–129 mph, 178–208 km/h) Category 4 (130–156 mph, 209–251 km/h) Category 5 (≥157 mph, ≥252 km/h) Unknown Storm type Tropical cyclone Subtropical cyclone Extratropical cyclone, remnant low, tropical disturbance, or monsoon depression

On September 9, the Joint Typhoon Warning Center (JTWC) started to monitor an area of convection approximately 150 nautical miles (280 km) to the east of Palau. At the time, its low-level circulation center had been developing under persisting deep convection, and was under an environment of moderate to strong vertical wind shear offset by strong, diffluent easterly flow. By the next day, the Japan Meteorological Agency (JMA) had upgraded the system into a tropical depression. As it continued to organize, the JTWC issued a Tropical Cyclone Formation Alert (TCFA) on the system at 14:00 UTC on the same day. 7 hours later, the agency started issuing advisories on the depression, designating it as 17W. By September 11, the depression intensified into a tropical storm, with the JMA naming the system as Sanba. The PAGASA had also started issuing advisories on the storm, handing its Philippine name Karen. Nine hours later, the JTWC also upgraded Sanba to a tropical storm, as its convective banding deepened and wrapped tighter to its low-level circulation center.

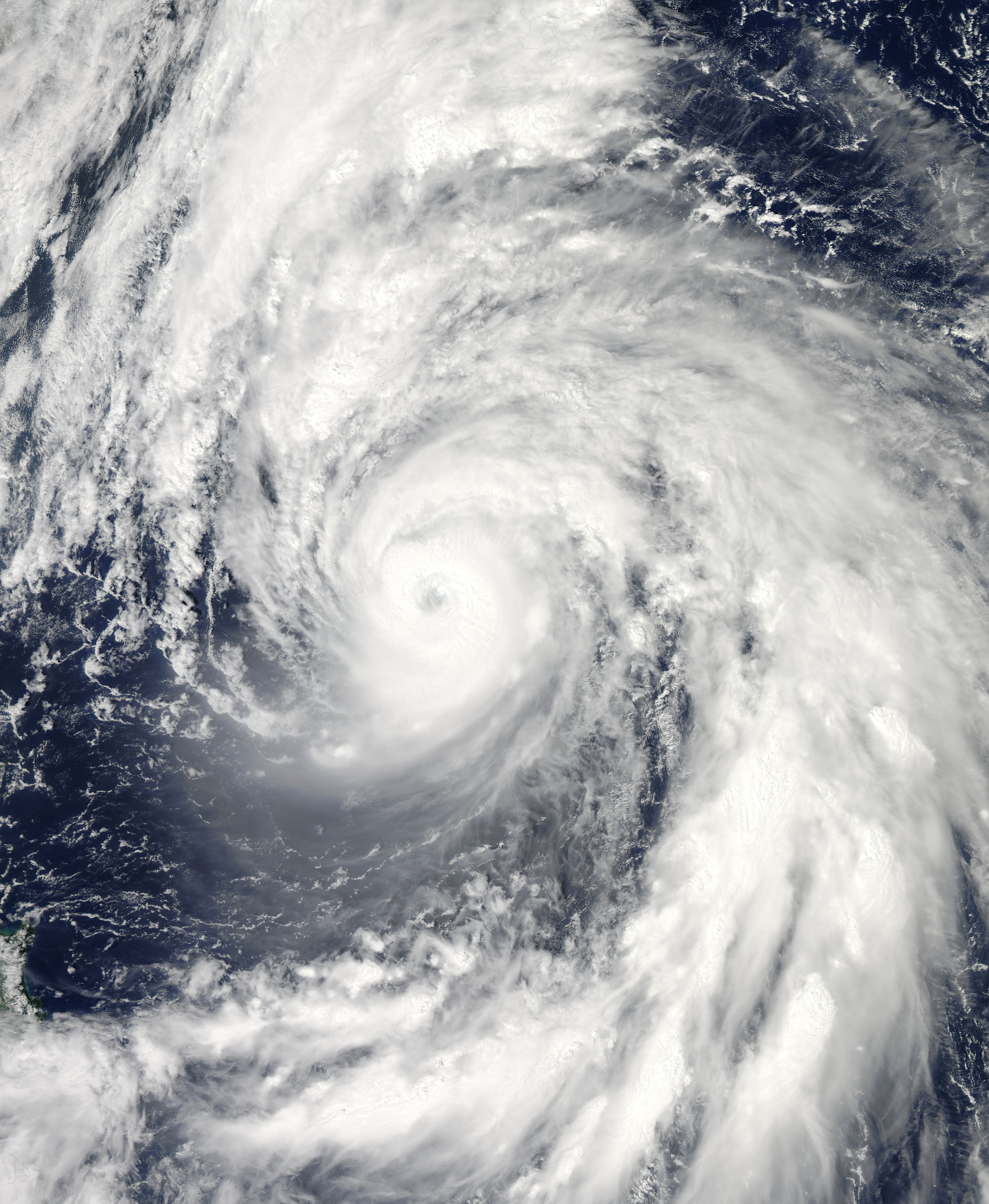
Typhoon Sanba approaching Okinawa on September 15

As wind shear decreased, Sanba continued to strengthen as it moved northwestward. At 06:00 UTC on September 12, the JMA upgraded Sanba to a severe tropical storm. Six hours later, Sanba intensified into a typhoon, as it formed a pinhole eye. Owing to favorable environment the storm was in, with 29–30 °C (84–86 °F) sea surface temperatures, low wind shear, radial outflow, an excellent poleward outflow being enhanced by a tropical upper tropospheric trough (TUTT) to the northwest, as well as a subtropical low southeast of Honshu, and an equatorial channel, Sanba then underwent explosive intensification overnight on September 12, going from a Category 1-equivalent typhoon to a Category 5-equivalent super typhoon on the Saffir-Simpson scale in only 18 hours, with a 18 nmi (33 km)-wide eye present on satellite imagery. Sanba ultimately reached its peak intensity at 18:00 UTC on September 13, with 10-minute sustained winds of 205 km/h (125 mph) and a central pressure of 900 mbar (hPa, 26.58 inHg), according to the JMA. The JTWC estimated Sanba to have 1-minute sustained winds of 285 km/h (180 mph). On September 14, Sanba showed signs of undergoing an eyewall replacement cycle, as concentric rings were seen in microwave imagery. It later weakened into a Category 4-equivalent typhoon at 15:00 UTC that same day, due to wind shear increasing once again as it continued northward. By the next day, it further weakened into a Category 3-equivalent typhoon, as dry air had started to encircle the system while it redeveloped its eye. A 25 nmi (46 km) eye soon reappeared on satellite imagery, with the subtropical jet stream enhancing its poleward outflow as it turned to the north-northwest under the influence of a deep-layered subtropical ridge positioned to the east of Japan. Sanba later exited the Philippine Area of Responsibility, with the PAGASA issuing its last advisory on the storm.

At 6:30 am JST on September 16 (21:30 UTC September 15), Sanba made landfall over Okinawa. Sanba then further weakened to a Category 2-equivalent typhoon, as higher amounts of wind shear began affecting its northwestern quadrant, along with decreasing sea surface temperatures. As it continued weakening, the tight banding into its ragged eye began to unravel, with strong poleward outflow continuing to sustain the system as wind shear became even stronger as it got embedded into the subtropical jet stream. By the next day, it weakened into a Category 1-equivalent typhoon, as it commenced its extratropical transition. Around 11:30 am KST (02:30 UTC), Sanba made landfall over Namhae County, South Gyeongsang Province, South Korea. The JMA downgraded Sanba to a severe tropical storm 3 hours later, before the JTWC subsequently issued their final advisory on the system. Turning to the north-northeast and emerging into the Sea of Japan, Sanba further weakened into a tropical storm. By September 18, Sanba transitioned into an extratropical cyclone, as it moved over Russia.

== Preparations and impact ==
=== Philippines ===
As Sanba was developing on September 10, flash flooding in Malaybalay, Bukidnon caused 53 families to be evacuated. No casualties nor damages were reported. A landslide occurred two days later in Hinabangan, Samar, where two houses were partially damaged, but no casualties were also reported.

Locally known as Karen, it enhanced the southwest monsoon affecting the Philippines, which caused flooding over parts of Metro Manila on September 15. The continued heavy rainfall also forced 300 families in Quezon City to be evacuated, along with 120 residents in San Juan. 10 domestic flights were also cancelled due to the heavy rains.

In Southern Leyte, a 70-year-old fisherman drowned amid bad weather conditions brought by the storm.

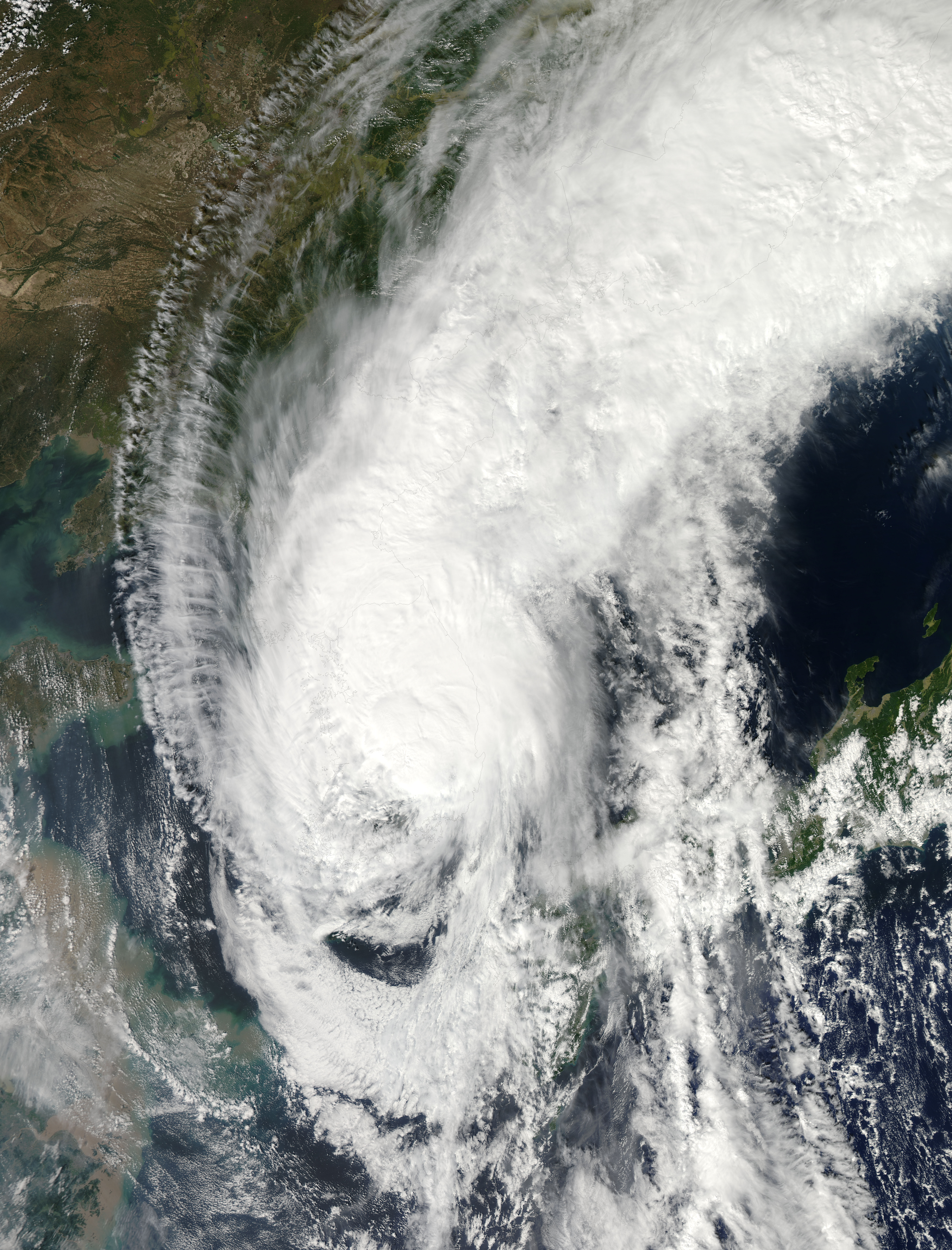
Sanba over South Korea on September 17

=== Japan ===
In Okinawa, more than 67,000 homes lost power, with flooding reported in some areas in the island as Sanba passed over on September 16. A man drowned while swimming in high waves off southern Nagasaki. Damage to agriculture, forestry, and fisheries amounted to ¥947 million (US$12.1 million). In Kōchi Prefecture, 222 ha (550 acres) of agricultural land was damaged by the storm, with losses reaching ¥50 million (US$640,000). Heavy rains from the storm in Gifu Prefecture triggered numerous landslides and caused significant flooding that washed out hundreds of roads. Losses in the prefecture reached ¥1.5 billion (US$19.1 million).

=== South Korea ===
As Sanba approached South Korea, typhoon warnings were issued to most of the country, including Seoul. More than 1,100 people were forced to evacuate their homes, and 380,000 households experienced power outage as the storm moved over the country.

Heavy rains from the storm washed out numerous roads and flooded cropland. More than 200 millimetres (7.9 in) of rain were received in the southern regions of the country during Sanba's passage. Numerous structures along rivers were damaged or destroyed by flooding. Across the nation, four people were killed and the damage from the typhoon reached ₩365.7 billion (US$328 million).

=== Russia ===
The extratropical remnants of Sanba brought flooding to Primorsky Krai. In Artyom, more than 300 ha (740 acres) of crops were inundated. Preliminary losses over the region were estimated to be ₽40 million (US$1.29 million).

== See also ==
- Other tropical cyclones named Sanba
- Typhoon Saomai (2000)
- Typhoon Rusa (2002)
- Typhoon Maemi (2003)
- Typhoon Vongfong (2014)
- Typhoon Haishen (2020)
- Typhoon Hinnamnor (2022)
- Typhoon Khanun (2023)
- Typhoon Jelawat (2012)
