= List of storms named Phanfone =

The name Phanfone (Lao: ຟານທອງ, [faːn˧˥ tʰɔːŋ˧˥]) has been used for four tropical cyclones in the western North Pacific Ocean. The name was contributed by Laos and refers to a gold-colored muntjac in Lao.

- Typhoon Phanfone (2002) (T0213, 19W) – a violent, Category 4-equivalent typhoon that affected Japan.
- Severe Tropical Storm Phanfone (2008) (T0810) – churned in the open ocean; not recognized by the JTWC.
- Typhoon Phanfone (2014) (T1418, 18W, Neneng) – another Category 4 super typhoon that made landfall in Japan.
- Typhoon Phanfone (2019) (T1929, 30W, Ursula) – struck the Philippines, resulting in at least 50 deaths and $67.2 million (2019 USD) in damages.

The name Phanfone was retired following the 2019 Pacific typhoon season and was replaced with Nokaen (Lao: ນົກແອ່ນ, [nok̚˧ ʔɛːn˧]), which means swallow in Lao.
