= List of storms named Ompong =

The name Ompong has been used for three tropical cyclones in the Philippine Area of Responsibility by PAGASA in the Western Pacific Ocean.

- Tropical Depression Ompong (2006) – wind shear from Typhoon Soulik prevented any intensification.
- Typhoon Vongfong (2014) (T1419, 19W, Ompong) – Category 5 super typhoon that struck mainland Japan.
- Typhoon Mangkhut (2018) (T1822, 26W, Ompong) – a destructive Category 5 super typhoon that made landfall in Cagayan, Philippines, and subsequently impacted Hong Kong and southern China.

The name Ompong was retired following the 2018 Pacific typhoon season and was replaced with Obet.
