= Typhoon Vongfong (2014) =

Pacific typhoon in 2014

Typhoon Vongfong (Ompong)
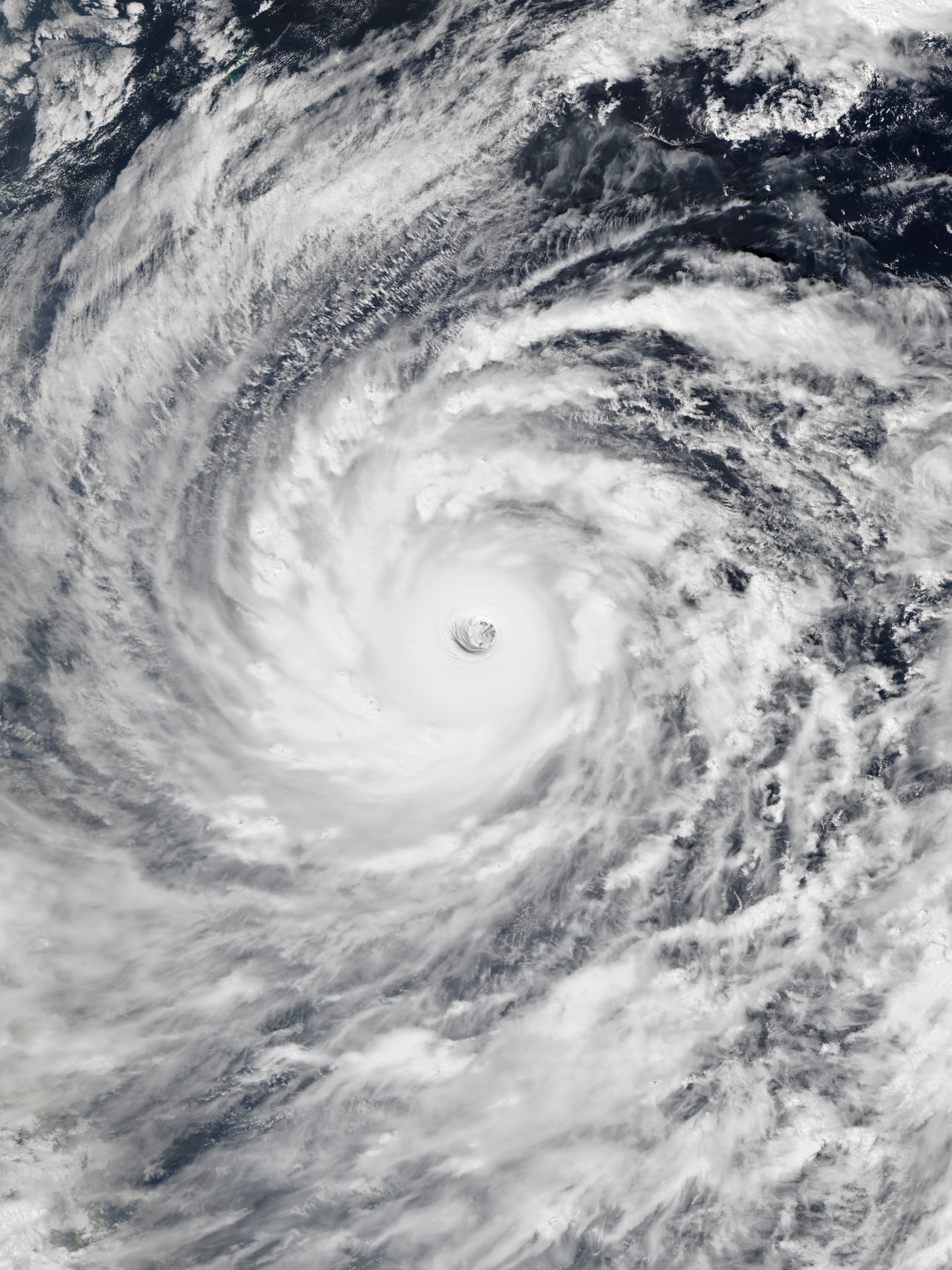
- Vongfong at peak intensity on October 8

Meteorological history
- Formed: October 2, 2014
- Post-tropical: October 14, 2014
- Dissipated: October 18, 2014

Violent typhoon
- 10-minute sustained (JMA)
- Highest winds: 215 km/h (130 mph)
- Lowest pressure: 900 hPa (mbar); 26.58 inHg

Category 5-equivalent super typhoon
- 1-minute sustained (SSHWS/JTWC)
- Highest winds: 285 km/h (180 mph)
- Lowest pressure: 907 hPa (mbar); 26.78 inHg

Overall effects
- Fatalities: 9
- Missing: 1
- Damage: $161 million (2014 USD)
- Areas affected: Caroline Islands, Mariana Islands, Philippines, Taiwan, Japan, South Korea, Kamchatka Peninsula, Alaska
- IBTrACS
- Part of the 2014 Pacific typhoon season

Typhoon Vongfong, (Note: The name Vongfong (Cantonese: 黃蜂, [wɔːŋ˨˩ fʊŋ˥]) was contributed by Macau and means wasp in Cantonese.) known in the Philippines as Super Typhoon Ompong, was the most intense tropical cyclone worldwide in 2014, and struck Japan as a large tropical system. It also indirectly affected the Philippines and Taiwan. Vongfong was the nineteenth named storm and the ninth typhoon of the 2014 Pacific typhoon season. Estimates assess damage from Vongfong to have been over US$160 million, mainly for striking mainland Japan. At least 9 people were killed along the path of the typhoon in those countries.

Both the JMA and the JTWC upgraded Vongfong to a tropical storm on October 3. Under low vertical wind shear and excellent outflow, Vongfong intensified into a typhoon east of Guam on October 5. Afterwards, subsidence and moderate to strong vertical wind shear caused the typhoon to struggle to intensify. On October 7, the PAGASA named the system Ompong, while it underwent rapid deepening owing to a TUTT cell. The JTWC then classified Vongfong as the sixth super typhoon of 2014, shortly before reaching peak intensity with a round eye late on the same day.

Maintaining peak intensity for over one day, Vongfong began to gradually weaken on October 9, because of an eyewall replacement cycle. On October 10, the structure of the typhoon decayed more, and it totally lost its eye feature on the next day when passing through Okinawa. Due to mid-latitude westerlies, Vongfong's low-level circulation center became partially exposed. The typhoon accelerated east-northeastward on October 12 and made landfall over Kyushu. The system continued passing through the main islands of Japan and weakened into a severe tropical storm on October 13, before it became extratropical on October 14.

== Meteorological history ==
Map plotting the storm's track and intensity, according to the Saffir–Simpson scale Map key Saffir–Simpson scale Tropical depression (≤38 mph, ≤62 km/h) Tropical storm (39–73 mph, 63–118 km/h) Category 1 (74–95 mph, 119–153 km/h) Category 2 (96–110 mph, 154–177 km/h) Category 3 (111–129 mph, 178–208 km/h) Category 4 (130–156 mph, 209–251 km/h) Category 5 (≥157 mph, ≥252 km/h) Unknown Storm type Tropical cyclone Subtropical cyclone Extratropical cyclone, remnant low, tropical disturbance, or monsoon depression

On September 30, a tropical disturbance began to persist near Ebon Atoll of the Marshall Islands, before the Japan Meteorological Agency (JMA) started to monitor the system as a low-pressure area early on the next day. Due to increased consolidation and favorable conditions, the Joint Typhoon Warning Center (JTWC) issued a Tropical Cyclone Formation Alert early on October 2, shortly before the Japan Meteorological Agency (JMA) upgraded the system to a tropical depression. More than a half of day later, the JTWC upgraded the system to a tropical depression and designated it as 19W, as a microwave imagery has already revealed the formative banding. When the tropical depression was tracking along the southern periphery of a deep subtropical ridge, the JMA started to issue tropical cyclone advisories at 00:00 UTC on October 3, shortly before the JTWC upgraded 19W to a tropical storm because of further consolidation. In the afternoon, the JMA upgraded it to a tropical storm and named it Vongfong, when the fragmented banding was wrapping broadly into the slowly consolidating low-level circulation center with a weak eye-like feature.

Under low vertical wind shear and excellent outflow, the JTWC indicated that Vongfong had intensified into a typhoon at 06:00 UTC on October 4, and the JMA upgraded the system to a severe tropical storm six hours later. With an improved northeastward channel into a tropical upper tropospheric trough (TUTT) cell, the storm briefly formed a pinhole eye on October 5, and the JMA upgraded it to a typhoon approximately 330 km (210 mi) east of Guam at 09:00 UTC. However, an area of subsidence north of the system and moderate to strong vertical wind shear began to impact Vongfong's development later. The typhoon continued struggling to develop further early on October 6, as the broken convective banding was wrapping into a re-consolidating low-level circulation center. In the second half of day, microwave imageries revealed that a thick eyewall structure had formed under a large central dense overcast, and a new but larger eye began to develop. Moreover, moderate vertical wind shear was being offset by excellent equatorward outflow and the motion of the system, when Vongfong was passing through the Northern Mariana Islands.

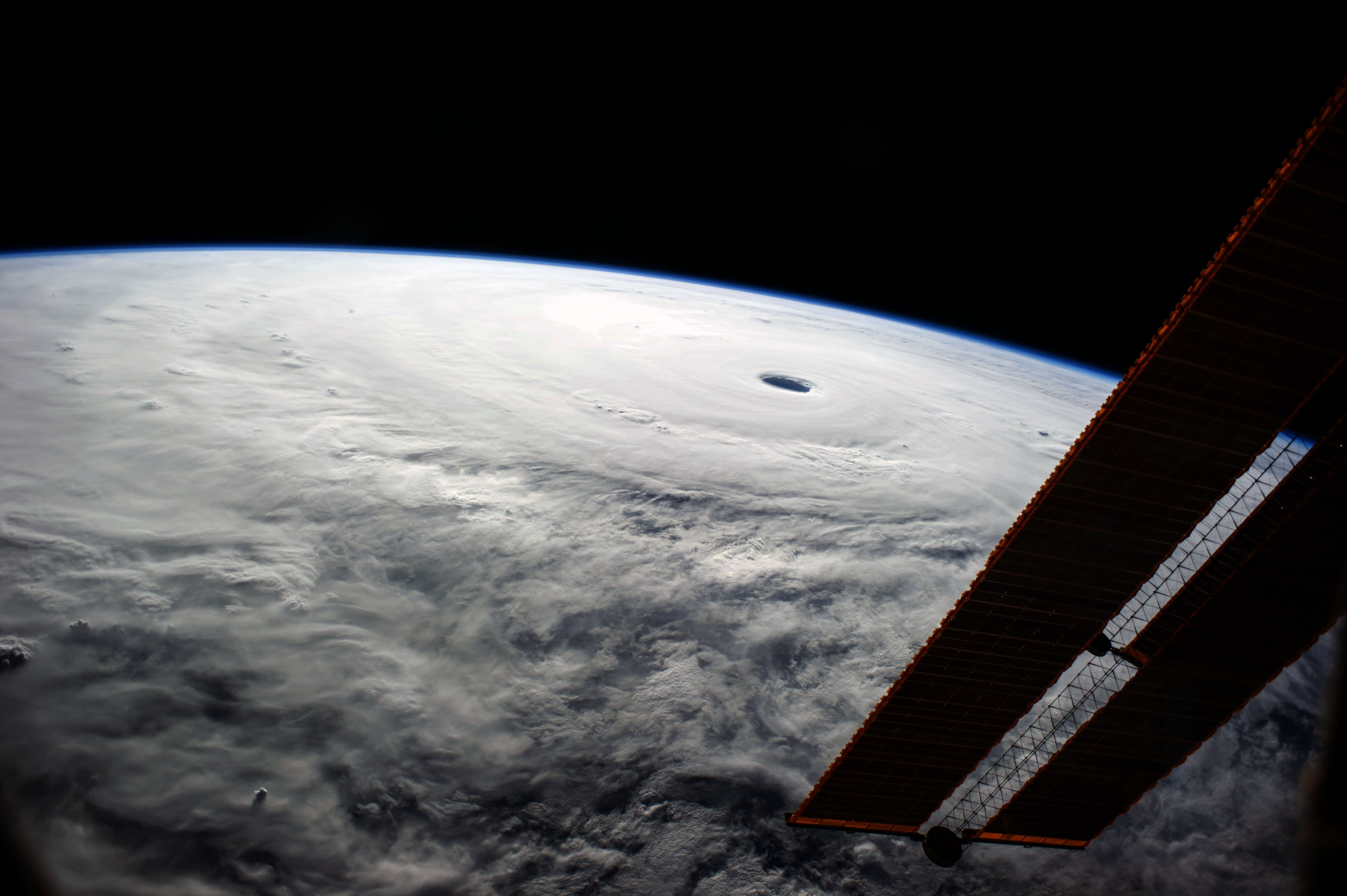
Typhoon Vongfong as seen from the International Space Station on October 9.

Once Typhoon Vongfong entered the Philippine Area of Responsibility shortly after 06:00 UTC on October 7, the PAGASA named it Ompong. The system started to undergo rapid deepening early on that day, owing to low vertical wind shear and multiple outflow mechanisms including a TUTT cell positioned to the east. The JTWC upgraded it to a super typhoon at noon, as the system had formed a 40 km (25 mi) round eye surrounded by a symmetric annulus of intense convection. Vongfong reached peak intensity six hours later, when the system's T-number of the Dvorak technique had increased to 7.5 according to both of the JMA and the JTWC, becoming the first tropical cyclone to reach that status since Haiyan in 2013. As the result, the JMA indicated that the maximum ten-minute sustained winds had increased to 215 km/h (134 mph) and the system's atmospheric pressure had dropped to 900 hPa (27 inHg). The JTWC also indicated that Vongfong had become equivalent to a Category 5 hurricane on the Saffir–Simpson hurricane wind scale, with maximum one-minute sustained winds at 285 km/h (177 mph). Additionally, although the typhoon was still generally tracking westward, it noticeably slowed down due to the weakening subtropical ridge.

The system continued maintaining peak intensity and tracked west-northwestward on October 8, although the JTWC indicated that the eyewall had slightly warmed. Having remained at peak intensity for 18 hours and at Category 5-equivalent intensity for 30 hours, Vongfong began to gradually weaken due to an eyewall replacement cycle. The JMA reported that Vongfong had become a large typhoon in the afternoon. As the system started to track northward along the western periphery of an extension of the subtropical ridge, the poleward outflow channel was diminished owing to the filled (weakened) TUTT cell which previously enhanced outflow. Early on October 10, the JTWC downgraded Vongfong to a typhoon, as the eye became more ragged and surrounded by elongated convection. The typhoon then turned north-northwestward in the afternoon due to some migratory ridging building in the north, when excellent outflow was being enhanced along the poleward side because of the mid-latitude westerlies.

Vongfong totally lost the eye feature owing to increasing southwesterly vertical wind shear on October 11, yet its circulation grew even larger. After crossing Okinawa Island and entering the East China Sea at 15:30 UTC, the overall structure of Typhoon Vongfong diminished more, resulting in the beginning of a significant weakening trend. On October 12, the convective organisation was almost diminished, as the only remaining deep convection became contained to the northern flank. Moreover, cold air stratocumulus clouds were observed streaming into the western periphery of the system, as the low level circulation center had become partially exposed and elongated caused by strong vertical wind shear. Because of these reasons, the JTWC downgraded Vongfong to a tropical storm early on that day. The system accelerated east-northeastward along the northwestern periphery of the subtropical ridge in the afternoon and made landfall over Makurazaki, Kagoshima at 23:30 UTC, right before the JMA downgraded Vongfong to a severe tropical storm only a half of hour later.

On October 13, Vongfong made landfall over Sukumo, Kōchi at 05:30 UTC, Awaji Island, Hyōgo at 10:30 UTC and Izumisano, Osaka at 11:00 UTC, yet the system had started the extratropical transition because of the formation of weak fronts. Isolated deep convection was displaced over the east quadrant of the exposed low-level circulation due to strong westerly vertical wind shear. Vongfong became completely extratropical at 00:00 UTC on October 14, shortly after the system arrived at the area off the Pacific coast of the Tōhoku region. Late on October 16, the extratropical system crossed the International Date Line. The storm split into two systems south of the Alaska Peninsula during the afternoon of October 17; however, the low that constituted Vongfong's remnants was absorbed into the new storm only a few hours later, early on October 18.

== Impact ==
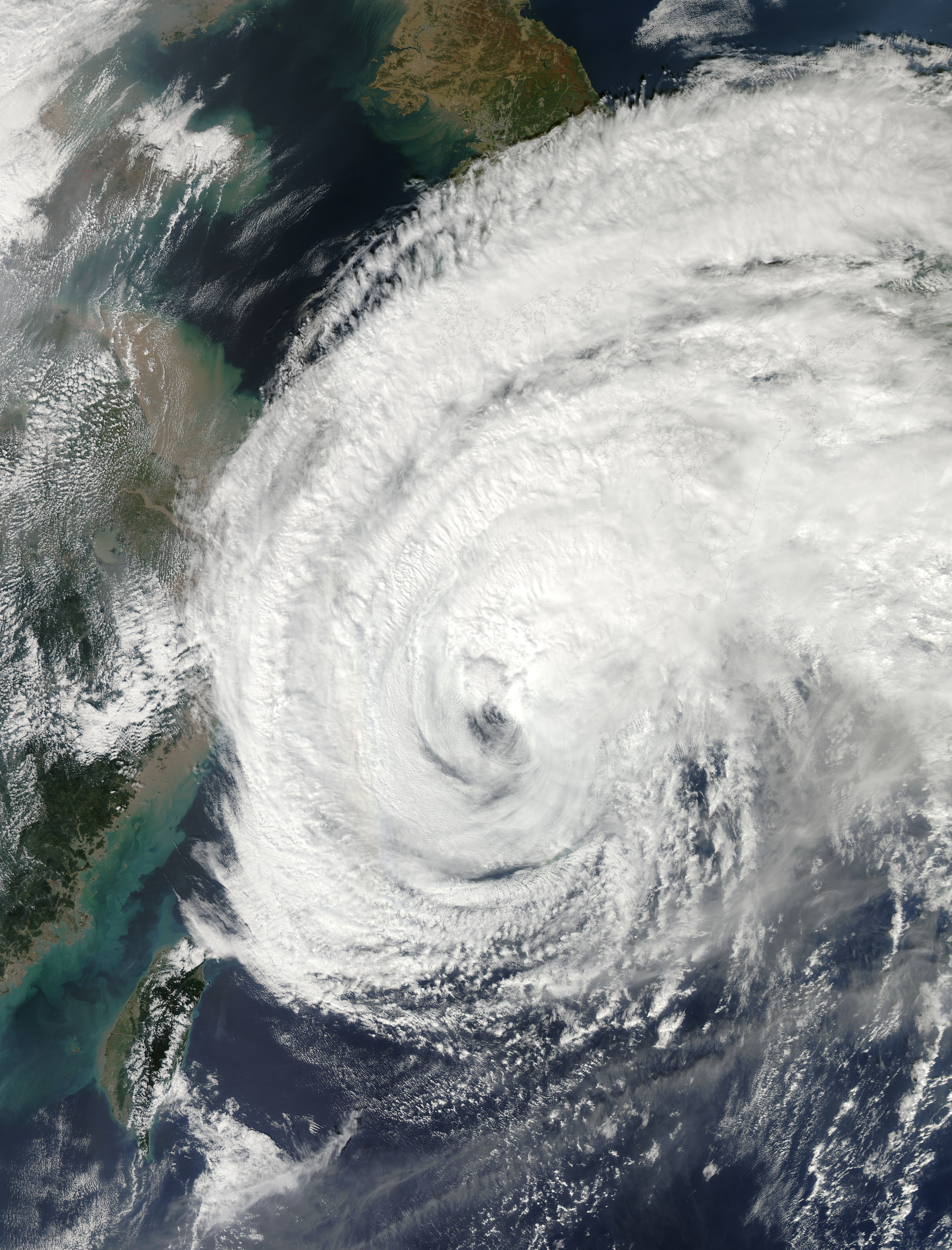
Typhoon Vongfong approaching Kyushu, Japan on October 12

=== Mariana Islands ===
Vongfong affected the Mariana Islands as an intensifying Category 2 typhoon on October 5. The highest winds gusts in Andersen Air Force Base were at 110 km/h (70 mph), while the highest wind gusts in Saipan were at 97 km/h (60 mph). Andersen Air Force Base also recorded rainfall of over 7 in (180 mm). In Yigo, 17 people were rescued from flooding. Total damage in Guam and Rota were estimated at $300,000.

=== Philippines ===
Vongfong was also known as Ompong in the Philippines. The typhoon affected the country by affecting the Intertropical Convergence Zone, bringing flash floods in parts of Visayas and Mindanao. Luzon also experienced northeasterly winds from Ompong. PAGASA had warned rough sea conditions in the seaboards of most eastern parts of the archipelago as the typhoon reached its peak strength. According to the NDRRMC, 4 people were killed due to heavy flooding as of October 18. Damages were estimated at PhP62.6 million (US$1.4 million).

=== Taiwan ===
RV Ocean Researcher 5 (海研五號), a large research vessel belonging to the Taiwan Ocean Research Institute which was worth NT$1.46 billion (US$47.9 million) sank off the coast of Penghu at 20:11 TST (12:11 UTC) on October 10 as the vessel ran into a reef when it was sailing off in the afternoon on October 10, possibly due to the strong northeast surge in the Taiwan Strait enhanced by Typhoon Vongfong. Although 45 people on board were rescued, 2 researchers were killed, with 24 people injured. One was pronounced dead upon arrival at hospital, and the other died after doctors tried everything to keep him alive but to no avail.

=== Japan ===
Typhoon Vongfong, simply called “Typhoon No. 19” (台風第19号) in Japan, left some devastation throughout the country. On October 13, a 90-year-old man was found dead in an irrigation channel in Yazu, Tottori, as well as a 72-year-old man in Shikokuchūō, Ehime, who drowned after driving his light truck into a pond. One man went missing after three people were swept into water at the port of Chichibu, Saitama on October 12; he was confirmed dead later. Moreover, Vongfong also injured at least 96 people in the 23 prefectures of Japan. 33 people in Okinawa were injured, including a 9-year-old girl in Naha and a male in his 20s in Itoman with their fingers sandwiched between doors. 14 people in Hyōgo were injured, including a 56-year-old female in Kobe getting fractured by strong winds when riding a bicycle. Agriculture damages in Japan were calculated at ¥11.9 billion (US$111 million), including ¥865 million (US$8.03 million) from Okinawa.

== See also ==
- Weather of 2014
- Tropical cyclones in 2014
- Other tropical cyclones named Vongfong
- Other tropical cyclones named Ompong
- Typhoon Forrest (1983)
- Typhoon Melor (2009)
- Typhoon Jelawat (2012)
- Typhoon Neoguri (2014)
- Typhoon Phanfone (2014)
- Typhoon Malakas (2016)
