= Typhoon Jelawat (2012) =

Pacific typhoon in 2012

Typhoon Jelawat (Lawin)
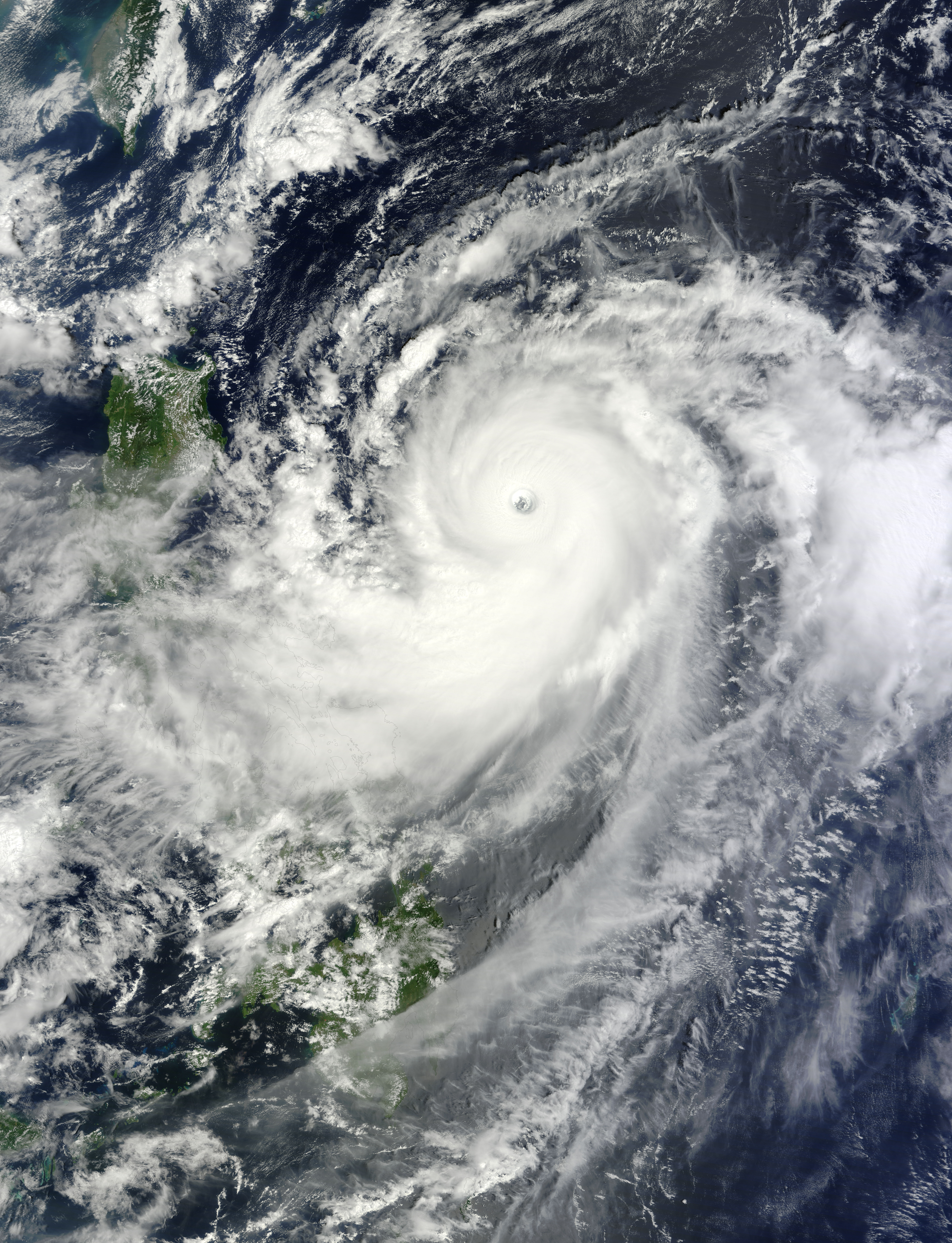
- Typhoon Jelawat at peak intensity on September 25

Meteorological history
- Formed: September 20, 2012
- Extratropical: October 1, 2012
- Dissipated: October 3, 2012

Violent typhoon
- 10-minute sustained (JMA)
- Highest winds: 205 km/h (125 mph)
- Lowest pressure: 905 hPa (mbar); 26.72 inHg

Category 5-equivalent super typhoon
- 1-minute sustained (SSHWS/JTWC)
- Highest winds: 260 km/h (160 mph)
- Lowest pressure: 918 hPa (mbar); 27.11 inHg

Overall effects
- Fatalities: 2 total
- Damage: $115 million (2012 USD)
- Areas affected: Japan, Philippines, Taiwan, Alaska, Russian Far East
- IBTrACS
- Part of the 2012 Pacific typhoon season

Typhoon Jelawat, (Note: The name Jelawat (Malay: jelawat, [dʒəlawat]) was contributed by Malaysia and refers to the sultan fish (Leptobarbus hoevenii) in Malay.) known in the Philippines as Typhoon Lawin, was the most intense tropical cyclone of the 2012 Pacific typhoon season in terms of ten-minute maximum sustained winds, tied with Typhoon Sanba. Following Bolaven and Sanba, Jelawat was the third typhoon directly hit Okinawa Island in 2012. Jelawat is also the seventeenth named storm, the eleventh typhoon and the second super typhoon.

The origins of Jelawat formed as a disturbance east of Guam on September 17. Three days later, PAGASA named the system Lawin as it entered the Philippine Area of Responsibility. JTWC later classified Lawin on the same day as Tropical Depression 18W as it moves over favorable conditions. Soon after, it gained the same Jelawat by the JMA as 18W intensified into a tropical storm. With very low vertical wind shear and favourable outflow aloft, Jelawat rapidly intensified and reached peak intensity as a Category 5-equivalent super typhoon late on September 24 and maintained it for nearly two days. The typhoon passed through Okinawa Prefecture on September 29 and finally made landfall over Aichi Prefecture in Japan on September 30. Jelawat was the strongest typhoon for Okinawa Island in 2012 by observed winds, as it also killed 2 people in Japan.

== Meteorological history ==
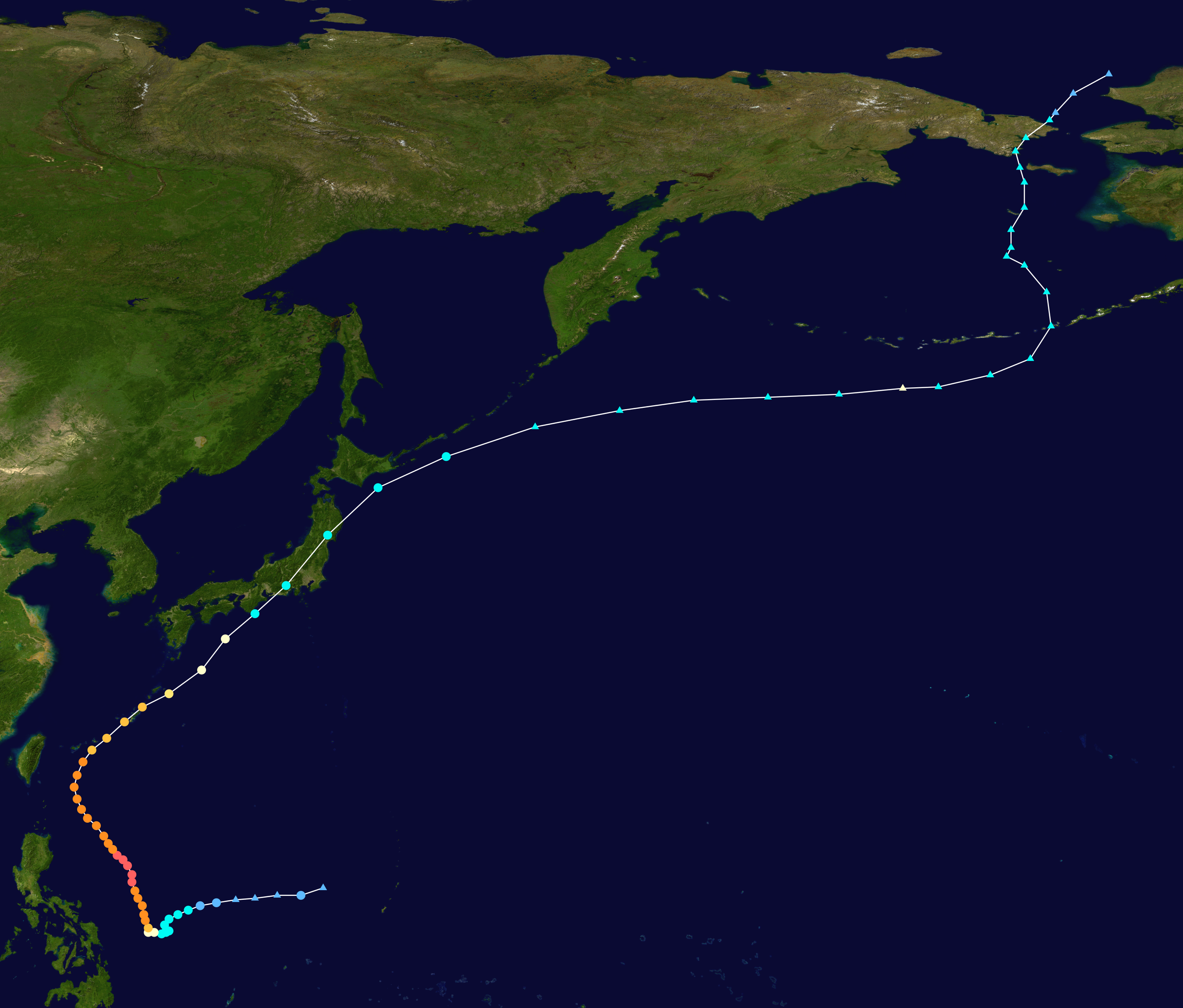
Map plotting the storm's track and intensity, according to the Saffir–Simpson scale Map key Saffir–Simpson scale Tropical depression (≤38 mph, ≤62 km/h) Tropical storm (39–73 mph, 63–118 km/h) Category 1 (74–95 mph, 119–153 km/h) Category 2 (96–110 mph, 154–177 km/h) Category 3 (111–129 mph, 178–208 km/h) Category 4 (130–156 mph, 209–251 km/h) Category 5 (≥157 mph, ≥252 km/h) Unknown Storm type Tropical cyclone Subtropical cyclone Extratropical cyclone, remnant low, tropical disturbance, or monsoon depression

Late on September 17, a tropical disturbance formed east of Guam, and the Joint Typhoon Warning Center (JTWC) issued a Tropical Cyclone Formation Alert on the system in the next two days, shortly before the Japan Meteorological Agency (JMA) upgraded the low-pressure area to a tropical depression early on September 20. Several hours later, on September 20, the Philippine Atmospheric, Geophysical and Astronomical Services Administration (PAGASA) upgraded the system to a tropical depression named Lawin, before JTWC also upgraded it to a tropical depression due to low vertical wind shear and improved equatorward outflow. Soon, JMA upgraded the system to a tropical storm and named it Jelawat, and so did JTWC.

Since September 21, Jelawat moved southwestwards slowly by tracking along the southwestern extension of the subtropical ridge anchoring east of Japan. Despite favourable conditions, the storm has struggled to improve its organization. When Jelawat was drifting westwards by a weak steering environment on September 22, it intensified into a severe tropical storm for excellent equatorward outflow because of speedy divergence to the south, and a tropical upper tropospheric trough cell northeast of the system started to improve its poleward outflow. Later, the system began to form an eyewall with excellent equatorward outflow and good poleward outflow.

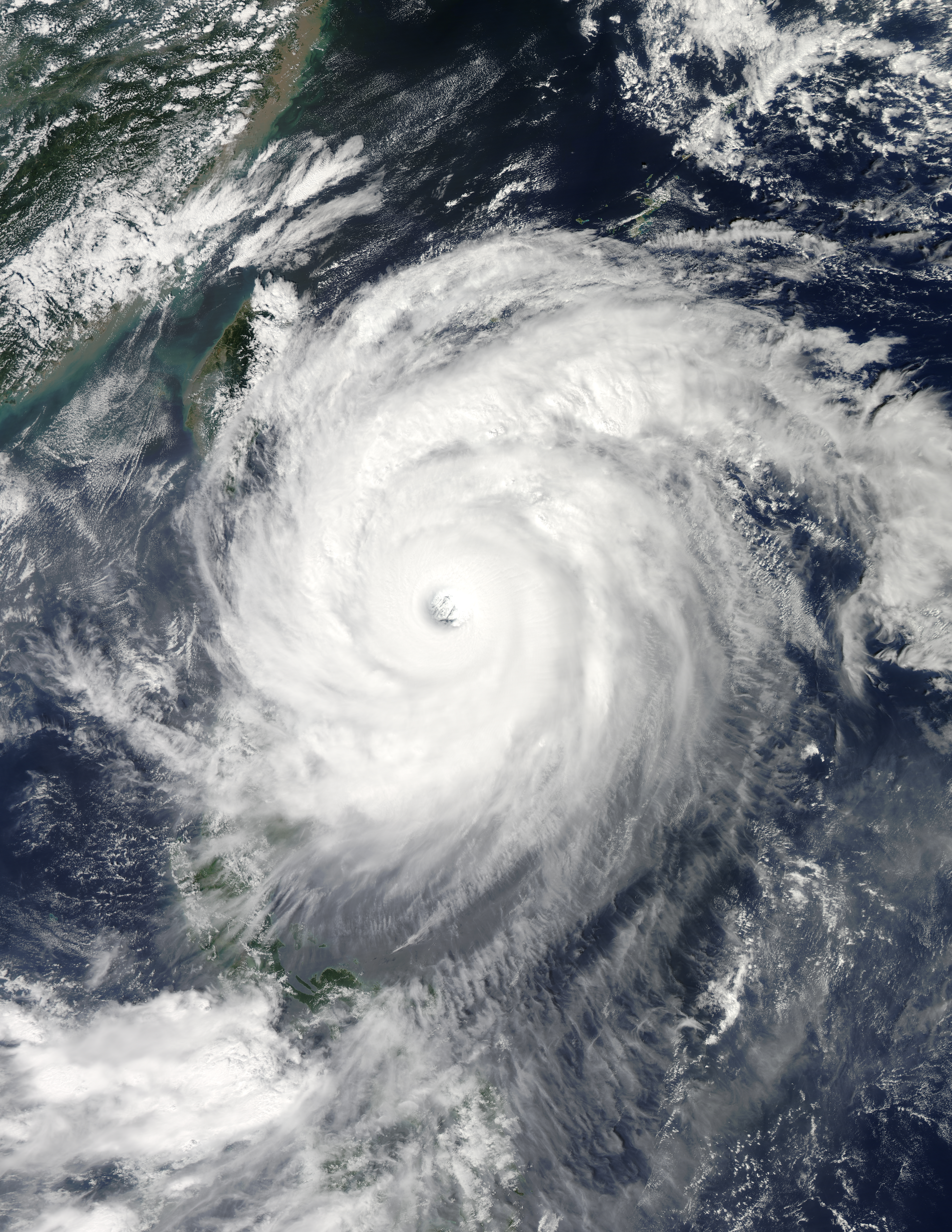
Typhoon Jelawat is approaching Okinawa on September 27

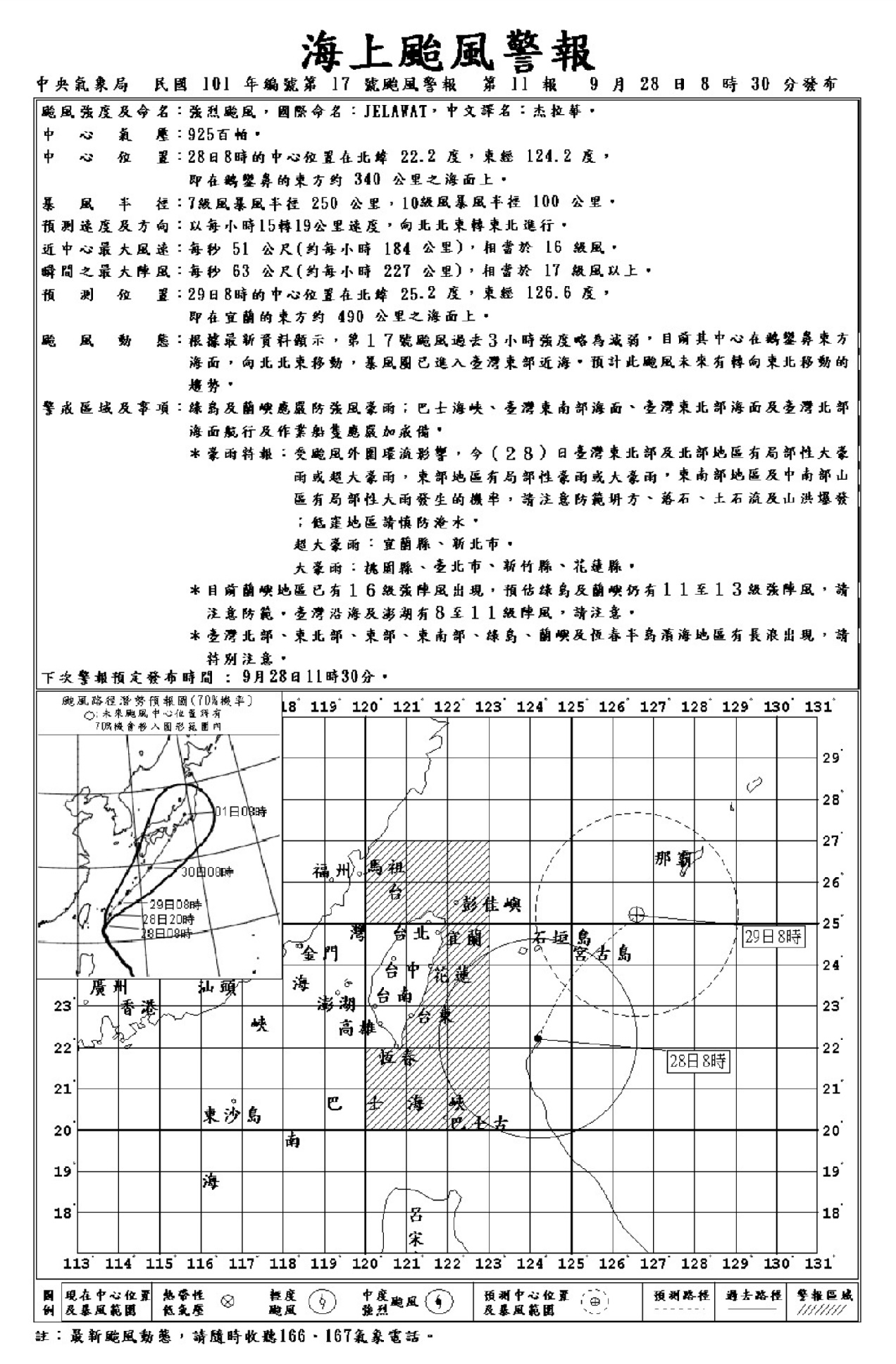
28 September, Taiwan Central Weather Bureau's Maritime Typhoon Warning

Based on the improved organization, both JMA and JTWC upgraded Jelawat to a typhoon early on September 23, before the system began to drift northwards due to a complex steering environment resulting from a trough over East Asia and a tropical depression (later becoming Severe Tropical Storm Ewiniar) in the east. Eighteen hours later, JTWC upgraded Jelawat to a super typhoon after the system underwent explosive intensification, becoming a well-developed system with a 10-nautical-mile (19 km; 12 mi) eye and strong spiral banding.

Late on September 24, with low vertical wind shear and favourable outflow aloft across all quadrants, Typhoon Jelawat attained its peak intensity by the 10-minute maximum sustained winds reaching 110 knots (205 km/h, 125 mph) and the atmospheric pressure decreasing to 905 hPa (26.72 inHg). The typhoon also reached category 5 strength on the Saffir–Simpson hurricane wind scale, with a solid band of deep convection surrounding a 20-nautical-mile (37 km; 23 mi) eye. Tracking northwestwards since September 25, Typhoon Jelawat entered an eyewall replacement cycle, and the process ended with a 25-nautical-mile (46 km; 29 mi) eye on the next day.

Having maintained peak intensity for nearly two days because of excellent radial outflow enhanced by a poleward stream, Jelawat weakened slightly from late September 26 to early September 27, yet the diameter of that larger eye became 40 nautical miles (74 km; 46 mi). Later, the system tracked northward, for a trough over East China was eroding the subtropical ridge. When approaching Okinawa, Jelawat began to move northeastwards by tracking along the western edge of the subtropical ridge on September 28, and JTWC downgraded the system to a typhoon for a slight elongation in the overall shape. At the same time, Jelawat weakened slightly due to another eyewall replacement cycle, but radial outflow and improving poleward outflow into a deep mid-latitude shortwave trough helped the typhoon maintain intensity.

With a shrunken 7-nautical-mile (13 km; 8.1 mi) pinhole eye, Typhoon Jelawat passed through the west coast of Okinawa Island early on September 29, when the estimated 10-minute maximum sustained winds were at 90 knots (165 km/h, 105 mph). Equatorward outflow has significantly hindered, as Jelawat started to gradually weaken; however, poleward outflow remained well-established and was linked to a deep mid-latitude trough directly to the north of the system. Then, the typhoon accelerated northeastwards and moved into an area of strong southwesterly vertical wind shear, but jet-induced poleward outflow kept the system from rapidly decaying.

Since September 30, Jelawat was fully embedded in the baroclinic zone and began extratropical transition, as the convective banding was unraveling. At 06Z, JTWC downgraded Jelawat to a tropical storm, as deep convection was sheared to the north. The system made landfall over Aichi Prefecture in Japan at 10Z, when the estimated 10-minute maximum sustained winds were at 70 knots (130 km/h, 80 mph). Eight hours later, JMA downgraded Jelawat to a severe tropical storm when it was located in Iwate Prefecture, and JTWC issued the final warning on the system simultaneously. On October 1, JMA downgraded Jelawat to a tropical storm, shortly before becoming extratropical east of the Kuril Islands. The extratropical cyclone strengthened and regained storm-force status on October 2, before the system crossed the International Date Line and began to weaken on October 3.

== Preparations and impact ==
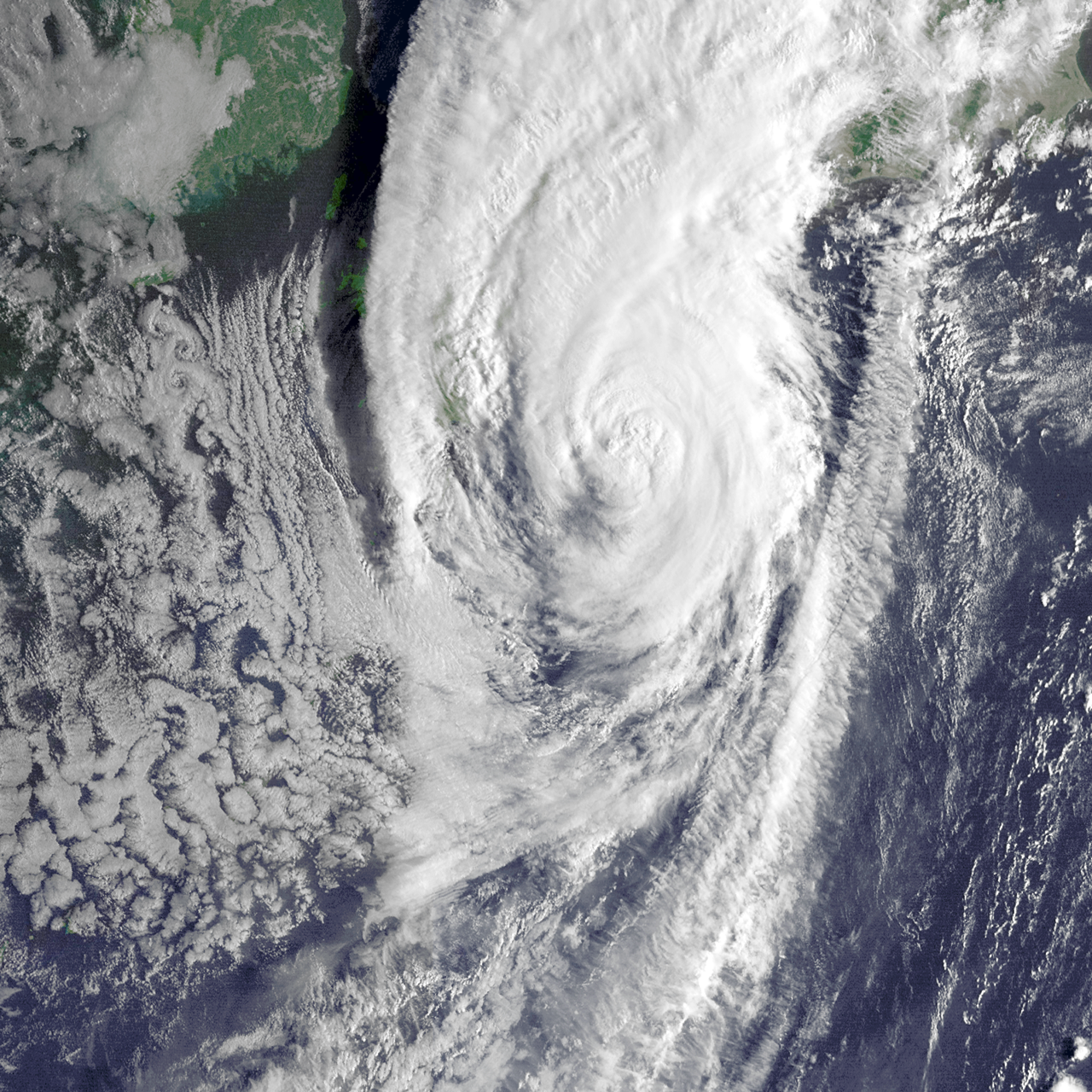
Typhoon Jelawat is nearing landfall over Japan on September 29. A Kármán vortex street can also be seen on the left of the frame, off the Jeju do

On September 29, 2012, Jelawat passed through Okinawa Prefecture. According to the Japan Meteorological Agency, the maximum gust produced by Typhoon Jelawat was at 62.6 m/s (225 km/h) in Miyagi Island of Uruma, Okinawa. The maximum sustained winds were at 41.1 m/s (148 km/h) in Naha, ranked the tenth-strongest in that county seat and the largest city of Okinawa Prefecture on record. The storm also produced the maximum gust at 61.2 m/s (220 km/h) in Naha, ranked the third-strongest in that city on record.

Reports suggested that some 65 people were injured in the storm while 331,000 people remained without electricity. Strong winds flipped cars and uprooted trees. A four-ton truck was reportedly turned upside down by the winds, causing a major roadblock in Naha. Flights and ferries connecting Okinawa to the rest of Japan were all cancelled. Jelawat was known locally as Typhoon Seventeen. Up to 4,200 households in the regions of Higashi and Nago were asked to evacuate immediately. Across Okinawa Prefecture, damage to agriculture amounted to ¥1.7 billion (US$21.6 million).

In Japan, preparations for the storm started early on September 30. The storm was located nearly 220 km (140 mi) south of the southwestern prefecture of Kochi, when officials warned the locals of strong winds, torrential rain, landslides, and possible flash flooding. By then, Jelawat had already injured 96 people. In Tokyo, several trains were cancelled, and up to 300 flights to the city's Narita International Airport were cancelled. Up to 20 inches (510 mm) of rain was expected. By October 1, one person had been killed and 140 other people were reportedly injured. Authorities in the central city of Nagoya have made it compulsory for 57,000 people to leave their homes in the wake of rising river levels in the city, which can cause significant flooding. Among the dead was a 29-year-old man who was swept away by high waves while the typhoon was passing through Okinawa. In Mie Prefecture, another 2,000 people were asked to evacuate. Waves as high as 10 metres (33 ft) were advised of. Meanwhile, in Tokyo, up to 500 millimetres (20 in) of rain was expected over the next 24 hours. Several other trains were cancelled, and the total number of flights cancelled went up to 500.

By the night of October 1, a 56-year-old man who had been missing for the past 24 hours was confirmed dead, after he had drowned. Local news agency, NHK, reported that over 181 people were injured in the typhoon. A further 11,000 were told to evacuate in the city of Ishinomaki in the country's northeast, Jiji Press reported. The local Meteorological agency predicted rainfall of up to 400 millimetres (16 in) in some areas in the 24 hours.

Total agricultural damage across the nation reached ¥8.935 billion (US$115 million).

== See also ==
- Typhoon June (1975) - similar track
- Typhoon Bolaven (2012)
- Typhoon Sanba
- Typhoon Phanfone and Vongfong (2014) - a pair of super typhoons that both approached Japan just 2 years after Jelawat.
- Typhoon Lan
- Typhoon Faxai and Hagibis (2019) - another pair of destructive storms that also affected Japan with the latter becoming the costliest typhoon on record.
