= List of named storms (L) =

Storms are named for historical reasons to avoid confusion when communicating with the public, as more than one storm can exist at a time. Names are drawn in order from predetermined lists. For tropical cyclones, names are assigned when a system has one-, three-, or ten-minute winds of more than 65 km/h (40 mph). Standards, however, vary from basin to basin. For example, some tropical depressions are named in the Western Pacific, while within the Australian and Southern Pacific regions, the naming of tropical cyclones are delayed until they have gale-force winds occurring more than halfway around the storm center.

This list covers the letter L.

== Storms ==
Note: † indicates the name was retired after that usage in the respective basin

- Labuyo

- 2001 – made landfall on Taiwan.
- 2005 – a typhoon that hit Vietnam and China the most powerful storm to affect Hainan in over 30 years, killing more than 113 people.
- 2009 – remained out in the open ocean.
- 2013† – powerful typhoon that made landfall on Luzon, in the Philippines, and later in Guangdong, China.

- Laila (2010) – a severe cyclonic storm that struck southeastern India, killing 65 people.
- Lala

- 1984 – a tropical storm southeast of Hawaii.
- 2026 – a Category 4 hurricane that caused extensive flooding in Hawaii.

- Lam (2015)† – a tropical cyclone that struck Australia's Northern Territory.
- Lan

- 2017 – a typhoon that struck Japan, causing $2 billion in damage and killing 17 people.
- 2023 – a powerful category 4 typhoon that struck Japan.

- Lana

- 1948 – a Category 1 typhoon in the western Pacific that did not affect land.
- 2009 – a strong tropical storm that passed south of Hawaii.

- Lance (1984)† – a tropical cyclone off the east coast of Australia.
- Lando

- 2007 – an erratic, late-season typhoon which traversed the Philippines twice.
- 2011 – a weak and short-lived system which was only recognized by PAGASA and JMA.
- 2015† – a strong typhoon that struck the Philippines, claiming 62 lives and inflicting a damage total worth ₱14.4 billion (US$313 million).

- Lane

- 1978 – a tropical storm over the open eastern Pacific Ocean.
- 1982 – a tropical storm southwest of Mexico.
- 1988 – a Category 2 hurricane that formed south of Mexico and moved westward.
- 1994 – a Category 4 hurricane that moved across much of the eastern Pacific.
- 2000 – a Category 2 hurricane that later brought rainfall to California.
- 2006 – a strong Category 3 hurricane that made landfall in the Mexican state of Sinaloa.
- 2012 – a Category 1 hurricane southwest of Mexico.
- 2018 – a powerful Category 5 hurricane that weakened as it approached Hawaii.
- 2024 – a tropical storm that remained away from land.

- Lannie

- 2017 – an intense and destructive tropical cyclone that affected parts of East Asia, especially Japan, during September 2017.
- 2021 – a tropical storm which caused minor damage to the Philippines, Vietnam, and Hainan Island.
- 2025 – a Category 1 typhoon which affected Hong Kong, Macau, and South China.

- Larry

- 2003 – tropical storm that hit the Mexican state of Tabasco.
- 2006† – powerful cyclone that struck northeastern Australia, leaving $1.1 billion in damage.
- 2021 – a large and long-lived hurricane that made landfall in Newfoundland.

- Laura

- 1947 – typhoon in the western Pacific.
- 1967 – tropical cyclone in the southwest Pacific Ocean.
- 1971 – a system that formed off Panama, looped south of western Cuba and landed in southern Belize.
- 2008 – a large but short-lived system that remained in the open ocean.
- 2020† – developed in the Caribbean Sea before growing into a powerful Category 4 hurricane in the Gulf of Mexico before making landfall in Louisiana.

- Laure (1980) – a powerful tropical cyclone that passed near Mauritius.
- Laurence

- 1990 – a weak tropical cyclone to the north of Western Australia.
- 2009† – a powerful cyclone that struck Western Australia three times.

- Laurie

- 1969 – a hurricane that looped in the Gulf of Mexico and struck Mexico twice.
- 1976 – a short-lived tropical cyclone in the South Pacific.

- Lawin

- 2004 – moved through the Ryūkyū islands before passing between South Korea and Japan.
- 2008 – remained far offshore north of Luzon.
- 2012 – the most intense tropical cyclone of the 2012 Pacific typhoon season in terms of ten-minute maximum sustained winds, tied with Typhoon Sanba.
- 2016† – a powerful category 5 super typhoon that made landfall in Peñablanca, Cagayan of the Philippines and in Haifeng County, Shanwei in the Guangdong province of China.

- Leah (1973) – a Category 3 severe tropical cyclone off northwestern Australia.
- Lee

- 1981 – typhoon in the western Pacific, a category 2 storm that caused 188 fatalities in the Philippines.
- 1985 – a tropical storm in the western Pacific that struck North Korea.
- 1988 – a tropical storm in the western Pacific.
- 2005 – a short-lived, minimal tropical storm in the Atlantic.
- 2007 – cyclone in the Australian basin that crossed into the south-west Indian Ocean, where it was renamed Ariel.
- 2011 – a strong tropical storm that made landfall in Louisiana, and its remnants caused catastrophic flooding in the Northeast US.
- 2017 – a Category 3 Atlantic hurricane that spent its initial stages as a weak tropical storm.
- 2023 – a Category 5 hurricane that remained in the open ocean, made landfall in Nova Scotia as an extratropical cyclone.

- Leepi

- 2013 – a tropical storm that brushed the Philippines and struck Japan.
- 2018 – a tropical storm that struck southwestern Japan.
- 2024 – weak tropical storm that did not affect land.

- Lehar (2013) – a very severe cyclonic storm that originated in the South China Sea and moved across the Bay of Bengal, later striking India.
- Lekima

- 2001 – a typhoon that struck Taiwan and China.
- 2007 – a tropical storm that brought heavy rains to Luzon and struck Vietnam.
- 2013 – the second strongest 2013 storm worldwide.
- 2019† – brought heavy rains and flooding to Luzon due to its enhancement of the southwest monsoon, later intensifying into the season's second super typhoon, and made landfall in China.

- Lena

- 1971 – a tropical cyclone off northeastern Australia.
- 1983† – a tropical cyclone that struck Port Hedland, Western Australia.
- 1993 – a tropical cyclone between Western Australia and Indonesia.

- Lenny (1999)† – a Category 4 Atlantic hurricane that crossed the Caribbean from west to east, later crossing the northern Lesser Antilles.
- Leo

- 1977 – a tropical cyclone that struck Port Hedland, Western Australia.
- 1999 – a typhoon that struck southern China.
- 2000 – a tropical cyclone that formed near French Polynesia.

- Leon

- 1989 – a powerful tropical cyclone in the south-west Indian Ocean stayed out at sea.
- 2000 – a tropical cyclone off Western Australia that was renamed Eline in the south-west Indian Ocean.
- 2020 – a weak, but deadly tropical cyclone that impacted central Vietnam.
- 2024† – a large Category 4 super typhoon that made landfall in Taiwan.

- Leonie (1969) – a short-lived tropical cyclone off southwest Western Australia.
- Les (1998) – a tropical cyclone that struck the Northern Territory and Western Australia.
- Leslie

- 1979 – cyclone in the Southwest Pacific Ocean.
- 2000 – weak tropical storm that impacted Bermuda, Florida, Cuba, and Newfoundland.
- 2012 – long-lived Category 1 hurricane that caused minor damage in Bermuda and Newfoundland.
- 2018 – a long-lived tropical cyclone that constantly fluctuated between tropical storm and Category 1 hurricane intensity, made landfall in the Iberian Peninsula as an extratropical cyclone.
- 2024 – a Category 2 hurricane that traversed the open Atlantic.

- Lester

- 1980 – a tropical storm off the southern coast of Mexico.
- 1986 – a short-lived tropical storm over the open Eastern Pacific.
- 1992 – a minimal hurricane that struck the Baja California peninsula and Sonora, later entering Arizona as a tropical storm.
- 1998 – a major hurricane that paralleled the Mexican coastline, causing two deaths.
- 2004 – a tropical storm that dissipated just offshore Acapulco, Mexico.
- 2016 – a Category 4 hurricane that brushed Hawaii.
- 2022 – weak and short-lived storm that dissipated along the coast of southwestern Mexico

- Leucosia (1982) – a rare Mediterranean tropical cyclone
- Levi (1997) – a tropical storm that formed near the Philippines, killing 53 people.
- Lewis

- 1990 – a tropical storm that dissipated east of the Philippines.
- 1993 – a tropical storm that struck the Philippines and Vietnam.

- Lex

- 1980 – a typhoon that passed east of Japan.
- 1983 – a tropical storm that struck Vietnam, killing 200 people.
- 1986 – a tropical storm that passed through the Marianas Islands.

- Lexi (2018) – a subtropical cyclone in the South Pacific.
- Lezissy (1989) – a tropical storm in the south-west Indian Ocean.
- Li (1994) – a minimal hurricane that crossed much of the northern Pacific Ocean.
- Libby (1948) – a typhoon that passed south of Japan.
- Lidia

- 1981 – a deadly tropical storm that struck Sinaloa, killing 73 people and causing $80 million in damage.
- 1987 – a minimal hurricane southwest of Mexico.
- 1993 – a Category 4 hurricane that later struck Sinaloa, Mexico, killing 7 people.
- 2005 – a short-lived tropical storm southwest of Mexico.
- 2017 – a tropical storm that made landfall in Baja California Sur, killing 20 people.
- 2023 – a rapidly intensifying Category 4 hurricane that made landfall in the Mexican state of Jalisco.

- Lidy (1995) – a tropical depression in the south-west Indian Ocean that dropped heavy rainfall on Rodrigues.
- Lila (1986) – a tropical cyclone that was formerly named Billy in the Australian basin, was renamed Lila in the south-west Indian Ocean, and was again renamed Billy after it re-entered the Australian basin, where it later struck southwestern Australia.
- Lili

- 1984 – a rare December hurricane, made landfall in Haiti on Christmas Eve after degenerating into a group of thunderstorms.
- 1989† – cyclone in the South Pacific that impacted New Caledonia.
- 1990 – threatened the eastern United States for a short time but turned north, losing its tropical characteristics before reaching Nova Scotia.
- 1996 – caused extensive damage in Central America, Cuba and the Bahamas; killed eight in Central America while it was forming, and retained tropical storm winds as it crossed the British Isles, killing two in the United Kingdom.
- 2002† – impacted Windward Islands, Jamaica and Haiti. After crossing the western end of Cuba, it reached Category 4 strength but weakened substantially in the 12 hours before striking Louisiana. Killed a dozen on the islands and caused $850 million in damage to the United States.
- 2019 – off-season tropical cyclone in the Australian region that affected Indonesia and East Timor.

- Liling (1964) a powerful tropical cyclone that impacted Palau and the Philippines.
- Lillian

- 1963 – a tropical storm that struck western Mexico.
- 1973 – a minimal hurricane southwest of Mexico.

- Lilly (1946) – a typhoon that brushed Japan and struck South Korea.
- Lily

- 1966 – a tropical depression that passed north of Madagascar.
- 1967 – a minimal hurricane off the west coast of Mexico.
- 1971 – a Category 1 hurricane that struck Puerto Vallarta, Mexico, killing 12 people.
- 1975 – a Category 1 hurricane that never affected land.
- 1977 – a short-lived tropical storm northeast of Australia.

- Lin

- 1993 – a tropical cyclone in the South Pacific.
- 2009 – a tropical cyclone that passed near Tonga.

- Lincoln (2024) – a Category 1 tropical cyclone that affected Queensland, Northern Territory and Western Australia.
- Linda

- 1976 – made landfall south of Darwin, Australia.
- 1985 – crossed into the Central Pacific as a tropical depression.
- 1991 – recurved out to sea.
- September 1997 – second most intense hurricane in the Pacific basin with a minimum pressure of 902 mbar. Also the second strongest hurricane in the Pacific in terms of 1-min winds.
- November 1997 – made landfall in Vietnam and Thailand as a tropical storm.
- 2003 – never affected land.
- 2004 – a tropical cyclone southwest of Indonesia.
- 2009 – caused no damage or deaths.
- 2015 – affected Baja California.
- 2018 – a tropical cyclone off northeastern Australia.
- 2021 – long-lived Category 4 hurricane that stayed out at sea.

- Lindsay

- 1985† – a tropical cyclone that struck Broome, Western Australia.
- 1996 – a tropical cyclone southwest of Indonesia.

- Linfa

- 2003 – brought deadly flooding to areas of the Philippines and Japan in May and June 2003.
- 2009 – made landfall in Fujian.
- 2015 – a tropical cyclone that affected the northern Philippines, Taiwan and southern China in early July 2015.
- 2020† – a weak, short-lived but deadly and destructive tropical cyclone that was the twelfth wettest tropical cyclone on record and the second of nine tropical cyclones in a row to strike Vietnam in 2020, a little under a month after the less damaging Tropical Storm Noul.

- Lingling

- 2001 – a typhoon that struck the Philippines and Vietnam, killing 379 people
- 2007 – a tropical storm that formed in the North Pacific in mid-October 2007.
- 2014 – a tropical storm that brought landslides in southern Philippines early in the year.
- 2019 – a powerful Category 4 storm that passed through the Ryukyu Islands and Korea, and the strongest storm on record to strike North Korea.
- 2025 – a weak tropical storm that affected the Japan.

- Lionrock

- 2010 – a tropical storm that struck China.
- 2016 – a typhoon that looped south of Japan and struck eastern Japan, and also caused widespread flooding in North Korea; the storm killed 550 people.
- 2021 – a tropical storm which caused minor damage to the Philippines, Vietnam, and Hainan Island.

- Lisa

- 1966 – tropical cyclone in the Southwest Pacific Ocean.
- 1981 – cyclone in the Southwest Indian Ocean.
- 1982† – tropical cyclone in the Southwest Pacific Ocean.
- 1991 – tropical cyclone in the Southwest Pacific Ocean.
- 1996 – tropical storm in the western Pacific that made landfall in Southern China.
- 1998 – travelled north in the central Atlantic without approaching land.
- 2004 – formed off Cape Verde, a named cyclone in the central Atlantic for a record 11 days before reaching hurricane strength. Never affected land.
- 2010 – travelled in eastern Atlantic near Cape Verde.
- 2016 – formed in eastern Atlantic in close proximity to Cape Verde, churned in the open ocean without threatening land.
- 2022 – made landfall in Belize and then re-emerged into the Bay of Campeche as a weak tropical depression.

- Lise

- 1949 – a typhoon that passed east of Japan.
- 1971 – formerly Cyclone Yvonne in the Australian basin, it was renamed Lise in the south-west Indian Ocean and remained away from land.

- Lisette (1997) – a tropical cyclone that struck Mozambique, killing 87 people.
- Litanne (1994) – a powerful tropical cyclone that struck eastern Madagascar.
- Liua (2018) – a tropical cyclone near the Solomon Islands, also was the earliest in a South Pacific cyclone season for a storm to be named.
- Liwayway (2019) – a powerful Category 4 storm that passed through the Ryukyu Islands and struck North Korea as a Category 1 typhoon.
- Liza

- 1961 – a tropical storm that paralleled the southwest Mexican coast.
- 1968 – a minimal hurricane southwest of Mexico.
- 1972 – a short-lived tropical storm south of Mexico.
- 1976 – a category 4 hurricane that killed 1,263 people in northwestern Mexico.

- Lois

- 1952 – a typhoon that struck Hainan and Vietnam.
- 1966 – a hurricane in the Atlantic that passed west of the Azores.
- 1992 – a tropical storm that passed east of Japan.
- 1995 – a severe tropical storm that struck Vietnam.

- Loke (2015) – a minimal hurricane west of Hawaii.
- Lola

- 1953 – a typhoon that brushed eastern Japan.
- 1957 – a powerful typhoon that struck Guam.
- 1960 – a typhoon that struck the Philippines and later Vietnam, killing 58 people.
- 1963 – a typhoon that passed southeast of Japan.
- 1966 – a tropical storm that hit China.
- 1968 – a typhoon that passed north of the Marianas Islands.
- 1972 – a typhoon that formed near Micronesia and moved northward.
- 1975 – an early typhoon that struck the Philippines, killing 30 people.
- 1978 – a typhoon that struck China.
- 1979 – a typhoon that passed southeast of Japan.
- 1982 – a tropical storm over the open western Pacific.
- 1986 – a powerful typhoon that struck Pohnpei and later moved northward.
- 1989 – synonymous with that season's Ken (one storm with two names, thought to have been separate due to difficulties in tracking poorly organized systems); hit eastern China.
- 1990 – a tropical storm that hit Vietnam, killing 16 people.
- 1993 – a typhoon that struck the Philippines and Vietnam, killing 308 people.
- 2005 – a tropical cyclone near Tonga.
- 2008 – a tropical storm in the south-west Indian Ocean.
- 2023† – a powerful off-season cyclone that became the most intense on record in the Southern hemisphere during October.

- Loleng

- 1966 – struck China.
- 1970 – brushed the Ryukyu Islands and South Korea before making landfall in North Korea.
- 1974 – short-lived tropical depression, only recognized by PAGASA.
- 1978 – another weak system that was only recognized by PAGASA.
- 1982 – affected Taiwan, Japan and South Korea.
- 1986 – erratic typhoon that meandered near Okinawa before hitting South Korea.
- 1990 – minimal typhoon which struck Taiwan and mainland China.
- 1994 – short-lived tropical storm that affected the Philippines.
- 1997 – very strong typhoon which devastated the Philippines and eventually affected China, killing more than 300 people.

- Longwang

- 2000 – a short-lived tropical storm northeast of the Philippines.
- 2005 † – a powerful typhoon that struck Taiwan and China, killing 149 people.

- Lorena

- 1983 – a Category 3 hurricane that killed seven people in Mexico while paralleling the coast.
- 1989 – a minimal hurricane southwest of Mexico.
- 2001 – a tropical storm that dissipated near the southwest Mexican coast.
- 2013 – a tropical storm that struck the Baja California peninsula.
- 2019 – a Category 1 hurricane that made landfall in Baja California.
- 2025 – a Category 1 hurricane that approached Baja California but dissipated before landfall.

- Lorenzo

- 2001 – a weak tropical storm that formed at sea before becoming extratropical.
- 2007 – a Category 1 hurricane that struck Veracruz, caused significant damage.
- 2013 – moderate storm that formed at sea; its remnants contributed to the formation of the St. Jude storm which affected Europe.
- 2019 – the easternmost Category 5 hurricane on record, impacted Ireland and parts of United Kingdom while extratropical.
- 2025 – a strong tropical storm that never affected land.

- Loris (1971) – struck the north of Western Australia.
- Lorna

- 1954 – a typhoon that brushed Japan, killing 34 people.
- 1958 – a typhoon that brushed the eastern Philippines before turning away from the country.
- 1961 – a typhoon that hit Taiwan and southeastern China.
- 1964 – a short-lived tropical storm west of the Marianas Islands.
- 1966 – a typhoon that struck the northern Philippines.
- 1969 – a tropical storm that dissipated east of the Philippines.
- 1976 – a tropical storm that dissipated east of the Philippines.
- 2019 – a tropical cyclone that straddled the boundary between the south-west Indian Ocean and the Australian basin.

- Lorraine

- 1966 – a tropical storm that struck the Mexican state of Colima.
- 1970 – a Category 2 hurricane that moved across the eastern Pacific.
- 1974 – a tropical storm that moved in a Z-shaped track.

- Lottie

- 1968 – a short-lived tropical depression in the south-west Indian Ocean.
- 1973† – a tropical cyclone that capsized the ship Uluilakeba, killing 85 people.

- Louise

- 1945 – a typhoon that struck Japan, killing 36 people.
- 1951 – a powerful typhoon that struck the northern Philippines and later southern China, killing six people.
- 1955 – a powerful typhoon that struck southwestern Japan, killing 54 people.
- 1959 – a typhoon that struck Taiwan and China.
- 1962 – a typhoon that struck Japan, killing 15 people.
- 1964 – a powerful typhoon that struck the Philippines, killing 595 people.
- 1967 – a tropical storm that struck Japan.
- March 1970 – a tropical cyclone in the south-west Indian Ocean that passed near Mauritius.
- October 1970 – a typhoon that struck the Philippines and Vietnam.
- 1973 – a typhoon that struck the Chinese island of Hainan.
- 1976 – a powerful typhoon that recurved northeast of the Philippines.

- Love

- 1947 – a hurricane that passed close to Bermuda.
- 1950 – a hurricane in the Gulf of Mexico that struck Florida as a tropical storm.

- Lowell

- 1984 – a minimal hurricane southwest of Mexico.
- 1990 – a minimal hurricane off the southwest coast of Mexico.
- 2002 – a tropical storm over the open eastern and central Pacific.
- 2008 – a tropical storm that made landfall in Baja California and produced major flooding in the Midwest United States.
- 2014 – a minimal hurricane southwest of Mexico.
- 2020 – not areas land.
- 2026 – powerful Category 5 hurricane that bushed Hawaii with torrential rain, damaging winds, and dangerous surf.

- Lua (2012)† – a destructive tropical cyclone in Western Australia.
- Luana (2026) – a Category 2 tropical cyclone made landfall in the Western Australia.
- Luban (2018) – a very severe cyclonic storm that struck eastern Yemen in the midst of a civil war and cholera outbreak; the storm killed 14 people and left $1 billion in damage.
- Lucas (2021) – a Category 2 tropical cyclone made landfall in New Caledonia caused minor damage.
- Lucie (1978) – short-lived tropical depression northeast of Madagascar.
- Lucile (1965) - a possible tropical cyclone that affected Vanuatu.
- Lucille

- 1956 – a typhoon that was also named Karen, struck the Philippines.
- 1960† – a tropical storm that killed at least 108 people in the Philippines.

- Lucretia (1950) – a tropical storm east of Philippines that was later renamed Nancy.
- Lucy

- March 1962 – a short-lived tropical storm in the south-west Indian Ocean.
- November 1962 – a typhoon that struck Vietnam, killing five people.
- 1965 – a powerful typhoon that later struck Japan after it weakened.
- 1968 – a typhoon east of the Philippines.
- 1971 – a typhoon that brushed the Philippines and later struck China.
- 1974 – a tropical storm that struck southern China.
- 1977 – a typhoon east of the Philippines.

- Luding

- 1963 – strong typhoon that impacted the Philippines, southern China and northern Vietnam.
- 1967 – strong tropical storm that only affected land as an extratropical system.
- 1971 – Category 1-equivalent typhoon that struck the Philippines and China.
- 1975 – powerful typhoon which paralleled the coasts of the Ryukyu Islands and mainland Japan.
- 1979 – short-lived system monitored by PAGASA and JTWC; affected northern Philippines and southern Taiwan.
- 1983 – considered by JTWC as a tropical storm; made landfall in Hainan and northern Vietnam.
- 1987 – an intense typhoon which affected Okinawa, South Korea and Japan, claiming at least 40 lives.
- 1991 – a typhoon that hit northern Philippines, Hainan and northern Vietnam, killing 16.
- 1995 – a very strong typhoon which affected the Philippines, Taiwan and Japan but only caused 5 fatalities and minimal damage.
- 1999 – brought significant impacts to the Philippines, Hong Kong and southern China causing 23 deaths, including 3 who lost their lives due to a plane crash indirectly connected to it.

- Luis

- 1995† – a Category 4 hurricane, moved through the northern Lesser Antilles, leaving 19 deaths and $3.3 billion in damage
- 2006 – a strong typhoon, struck Japan; also known as Shanshan beyond the PAR
- 2014 – a minimal typhoon, struck the Philippines; also known as Kalmaegi beyond the PAR
- 2018 – a weak tropical depression, struck Taiwan
- 2022 – a minimal typhoon, did not threaten any land areas; also known as Roke beyond the PAR
- 2026 — weak tropical storm that made landfall in the Philippines; was renamed as Maymay after initially degenerating to a low pressure area.

- Luke

- 1991 – a tropical storm that brushed Japan, killing 12 people.
- 1994 – a tropical storm that hit the Philippines and Vietnam.

- Lulu (1970) – a tropical cyclone that hit northern Western Australia.
- Luma (2003) – a powerful subtropical depression that passed south of Madagascar.
- Luming

- 1965 – dissipated near the Philippines.
- 1969 – affected the Philippines.
- 1973 – a Category 5-equivalent super typhoon that caused 40 deaths with 28 missing.
- 1977 – a short-lived tropical storm that made landfall in Vietnam.
- 1981 – a depression only recognized by the PAGASA, Luming had no significant effects on land.
- 1985 – a strong Category 2 typhoon that struck Japan, killing 23.
- 1993 – a tropical storm that hit Japan, causing 13 fatalities.
- 1997 – a short-lived tropical storm that struck southern China.

- Lupit

- 2003 – powerful Category 5 super typhoon that affected the Federated States of Micronesia.
- 2009 – another powerful Category 5 super typhoon that formed northwest of Kwajalein, and recurved off Luzon, becoming extratropical northeast of Japan.
- 2016 – a tropical storm that formed east of Japan.
- 2021 – a weak storm that affected Southeast China, Taiwan and Japan.

- Luring (1993) – struck the Philippines and Vietnam
- Lusi

- 1986 – a weak tropical cyclone near Vanuatu.
- 1997 – a tropical cyclone that brushed Fiji.
- 2014† – a tropical cyclone that affected Fiji and New Zealand.

- Lusing

- 1964 – a strong typhoon which struck central Luzon, causing widespread flooding.
- 1968 – an intense typhoon that weakened before affecting northern Philippines, Taiwan and South China.
- 1972 – a tropical depression only recognized by PAGASA and the Joint Typhoon Warning Center (JTWC).
- 1976 – a fairly strong tropical storm which hit Hainan, claiming 2 lives.
- 1980 – a system which was only considered by the JTWC as a tropical storm and passed south of Taiwan before making landfall in mainland China.
- 1984 – short-lived tropical depression which remained at sea.
- 1988 – a tropical storm which affected no land areas.
- 1992 – the strongest and costliest typhoon to make landfall in Guam in 16 years; also affected the Philippines, Taiwan and East China, causing a total of 15 fatalities.
- 1996 – a relatively powerful typhoon that crossed the Philippines, Hainan and northern Vietnam in mid-August 1996.
- 2000 – a relatively minimal typhoon which caused 75 fatalities and incurred more than $6 billion USD in damages, becoming the costliest to impact the Korean Peninsula.

- Lydie (1973) – a very intense tropical cyclone that passed just west of Réunion, killing 10 people.
- Lynn

- 1981 – a tropical storm that struck the Philippines and China.
- 1984 – a tropical storm that struck Vietnam.
- 1987 – a typhoon that passed between the Philippines and Taiwan, killing 49 people.

== See also ==
- European windstorm names
- Atlantic hurricane season
- Pacific hurricane season
- Tropical cyclone naming
- South Atlantic tropical cyclone
- Tropical cyclone
