= Luding =

Luding may refer to:

- Luding County, in Sichuan, China
- Luding Bridge, in Luding County, China
- Christa Luding-Rothenburger, German speed skater and track cyclist
- Typhoon Dinah (1987), known as Typhoon Luding in the Philippines
