= List of storms named Luming =

The name Luming was used to name nine tropical cyclones within the Philippine Area of Responsibility by the PAGASA and its predecessor, the Philippine Weather Bureau, in the Western Pacific Ocean.

- Tropical Depression 13W (1965) (13W, Luming) – dissipated near the Philippines.
- Tropical Depression Luming (1969) – affected the Philippines.
- Typhoon Nora (1973) (T7315, 17W, Luming) – a Category 5-equivalent super typhoon that caused 40 deaths with 28 missing.
- Tropical Storm Carla (1977) (T7708, 11W, Luming) – a short-lived tropical storm that made landfall in Vietnam.
- Tropical Depression Luming (1981) – a depression only recognized by the PAGASA, Luming had no significant effects on land.
- Typhoon Pat (1985) (T8513, 13W, Luming) – a strong Category 2 typhoon that struck Japan, killing 23.
- Tropical Depression 12W (1989) (12W, Luming) – a minimal tropical depression which drenched Taiwan and the Ryukyu Islands, leading to 16 deaths.
- Tropical Storm Ofelia (1993) (T9305, 11W, Luming) – a tropical storm that hit Japan, causing 13 fatalities.
- Tropical Storm Zita (1997) (T9715, 17W, Luming) – a short-lived tropical storm that struck southern China.

After the 2000 Pacific typhoon season, the PAGASA revised its naming lists and the name Luming was excluded.
