= List of storms named Lucille =

The name Lucille was used for two tropical cyclones in the Northwestern Pacific Ocean:

- Typhoon Karen-Lucille (1956) – a typhoon that was also named Karen, struck the Philippines.
- Tropical Storm Lucille (1960) – a tropical storm that killed at least 108 people in the Philippines.

The name Lucile has also been used for one tropical cyclone in the South Pacific Ocean.

- Cyclone Lucile (1965) - a possible tropical cyclone that affected Vanuatu.
