= List of storms named Luis =

The name Luis has been used for six tropical cyclones worldwide: one in the Atlantic Ocean and five by PAGASA in the Philippine Area of Responsibility of the Western Pacific Ocean. In the Western Pacific, it replaced Lagalag, which was removed following the 2002 Pacific typhoon season.

In the Atlantic:

- Hurricane Luis (1995) – a Category 4 hurricane which killed 16 in the Leeward Islands and one in Newfoundland and Labrador.

The name Luis was retired following the 1995 Atlantic hurricane season and was replaced by Lorenzo.

In the Western Pacific:

- Typhoon Shanshan (2006) (T0613, 14W, Luis) – a strong typhoon which struck Japan
- Typhoon Kalmaegi (2014) (T1415, 15W, Luis) – a minimal typhoon which struck the Philippines
- Tropical Depression 24W (2018) (24W, Luis) – a weak tropical depression which struck Taiwan
- Typhoon Roke (2022) (T2218, 20W, Luis) – a moderate typhoon that did not threaten any land areas
- Tropical Storm Kujira (2026) (T2614, 13W, Luis-Maymay) — weak tropical storm that made landfall in the Philippines; was renamed as Maymay after initially degenerating to a low pressure area

== See also ==
- List of storms named Lewis – a similar name that has also been used in the Western Pacific
- List of storms named Lois – a similar name that has been used in the Atlantic and Western Pacific tropical cyclone basins
- List of storms named Louise – a similar name that has also been used in the Western Pacific and South-West Indian Ocean tropical cyclone basins

Preceded by Kiyapo	Pacific typhoon season names Luis	Succeeded by Maymay
