= List of storms named Luke =

The name Luke has been used for two tropical cyclones in the West Pacific Ocean:

- Tropical Storm Luke (1991) – a tropical storm that brushed Japan, killing 12 people.
- Tropical Storm Luke (1994) – a tropical storm that hit the Philippines and Vietnam.

== See also ==
Storms with similar names

- Hurricane Loke (2015) – a Category 1 Central Pacific Ocean hurricane.
- Cyclone Lucas (2021) – a Category 2 Australian region tropical cyclone that crossed into the South Pacific Ocean.
