= List of storms named Lisa =

The name Lisa has been used for nine tropical cyclones worldwide: five in the Atlantic Ocean, one in the Western Pacific Ocean, one in the South-West Indian Ocean, one in the Australian region, and one in the South Pacific Ocean.

In the Atlantic:

- Hurricane Lisa (1998) – a Category 1 hurricane that did not affect land
- Hurricane Lisa (2004) – a Category 1 hurricane that did not affect land
- Hurricane Lisa (2010) – a Category 1 hurricane that did not affect land
- Tropical Storm Lisa (2016) – did not affect land
- Hurricane Lisa (2022) – a Category 1 hurricane that became the only storm other than the 1942 Belize hurricane to make landfall in Belize at hurricane intensity during November

In the Western Pacific:

- Tropical Storm Lisa (1996) (T9611, 14W) – made landfall in China

In the South-West Indian Ocean:

- Cyclone Lisa (1981) – a moderate tropical storm that caused precipitation in the Mascarene Islands

In the Australian region:

- Cyclone Lisa (1991) – a Category 2 tropical cyclone that affected Papua New Guinea before crossing into the South Pacific Ocean

In the South Pacific Ocean:

- Cyclone Lisa (1982) – a Category 2 tropical cyclone that affected the Cook Islands and French Polynesia

== See also ==
Similar names that have been used for tropical cyclones:

- List of storms named Lise – also used in the Western Pacific Ocean and South-West Indian Ocean
- List of storms named Liza – used in the Eastern Pacific Ocean
