= List of storms named Lucy =

The name Lucy has been used for seven tropical cyclones worldwide: six in the West Pacific Ocean and one in the South-West Indian Ocean.

In the West Pacific:

- Typhoon Lucy (1962) (T6229, 85W) – a typhoon that struck Vietnam, killing five people.
- Typhoon Lucy (1965) (T6517, 20W) – a powerful typhoon that later struck Japan after it weakened.
- Typhoon Lucy (1968) (T6803, 06W, Konsing) – a typhoon east of the Philippines.
- Typhoon Lucy (1971) (T7117, 16W, Rosing) – a typhoon that brushed the Philippines and later struck China.
- Tropical Storm Lucy (1974) (T7413, 14W, Miding) – a tropical storm that struck southern China.
- Typhoon Lucy (1977) (T7720, 20W, Walding) – a typhoon east of the Philippines.

In the South-West Indian:

- Tropical Storm Lucy (1962) – a short-lived tropical storm.

== See also ==
- Tropical Storm Lucille (1960) – a West Pacific tropical storm with a similar name.
