= List of storms named Haikui =

The name Haikui (Mandarin: 海葵, [xaɪ˨˩˦ kʰweɪ˧˥]) has been used for three tropical cyclones in the northwestern Pacific Ocean. The name was contributed by China and means sea anemone. It replaced Longwang, which was retired after the 2005 typhoon season.

- Typhoon Haikui (2012) (T1211, 12W) – a costly Category 1 typhoon that made landfall in Zhejiang, China.
- Tropical Storm Haikui (2017) (T1724, 30W, Salome) – a weak storm that traversed the Philippine archipelagos of Luzon and Visayas.
- Typhoon Haikui (2023) (T2311, 10W, Hanna) – a powerful and costly Category 3 typhoon that made landfall in Taiwan in early September 2023, becoming the first storm to make landfall in Taiwan in nearly 4 years.

The name Haikui was retired after the 2023 Pacific typhoon season and was replaced with Tianma (Mandarin: 天马, [tʰiɛn˥ mä˧˩˧]), which refers to Tianma, a mythical winged horse, in Mandarin.
