= List of storms named Luding =

The name Luding was used for ten tropical cyclones by the Philippine Atmospheric, Geophysical and Astronomical Services Administration (PAGASA) and its predecessor, the Philippine Weather Bureau, in the Western Pacific Ocean.

- Typhoon Carmen (1963) (T6310, 23W, Luding) – strong typhoon that impacted the Philippines, southern China and northern Vietnam.
- Severe Tropical Storm Georgia (1967) (T6713, 12W, Luding) – a strong tropical storm that only affected land (Kamchatka Peninsula) as an extratropical system.
- Typhoon Freda (1971) (T7110, 10W, Luding) – a Category 1-equivalent typhoon that struck the Philippines and China.
- Typhoon Cora (1975) (T7513, 15W, Luding) – a powerful typhoon which paralleled the coasts of the Ryukyu Islands and mainland Japan.
- Tropical Depression 11W (1979) (11W, Luding) – a short-lived system that was monitored by PAGASA and the Joint Typhoon Warning Center (JTWC) and eventually affected northern Philippines and southern Taiwan.
- Typhoon Georgia (1983) (T8311, 12W, Luding) – a system that was considered by JTWC as a tropical storm; made landfall in Hainan and northern Vietnam.
- Typhoon Dinah (1987) (T8712, 11W, Luding) – an intense typhoon which affected Okinawa, South Korea and mainland Japan, claiming at least 40 lives.
- Typhoon Fred (1991) (T9111, 12W, Luding) – relatively powerful typhoon that hit northern Philippines, Hainan and northern Vietnam, killing 16.
- Typhoon Ryan (1995) (T9514, 19W, Luding) – a very strong typhoon which affected the Philippines, Taiwan and Japan but only caused 5 fatalities and minimal damage.
- Severe Tropical Storm Sam (1999) (T9910, 16W, Luding) – a potent tropical storm that was analyzed by JTWC as a typhoon; brought significant impacts to the Philippines, Hong Kong and southern China causing 20 deaths, in addition to 3 others who lost their lives due to a plane crash indirectly caused by it.
