= List of storms named Loleng =

The name Loleng was used for nine tropical cyclones in the Philippines by PAGASA and its predecessor, the Philippine Weather Bureau, in the Western Pacific Ocean.

- Severe Tropical Storm Ora (1966) (T6608, 08W, Loleng) – struck China.
- Typhoon Billie (1970) (T7011, 12W, Loleng) – brushed the Ryukyu Islands and South Korea before making landfall in North Korea.
- Tropical Depression Loleng (1974) – short-lived tropical depression, only recognized by PAGASA.
- Tropical Depression Loleng (1978) – another weak system that was only recognized by PAGASA.
- Typhoon Cecil (1982) (T8211, 12W, Loleng) – affected Taiwan, Japan and South Korea.
- Typhoon Vera (1986) (T8613, 11W, Loleng) – erratic typhoon that meandered near Okinawa before hitting South Korea.
- Typhoon Dot (1990) (T9017, 17W, Loleng) – minimal typhoon which struck Taiwan and mainland China.
- Tropical Storm Vanessa (1994) (T9406, 9W, Loleng) – short-lived tropical storm that affected the Philippines.
- Typhoon Babs (1998) (T9811, 20W, Loleng) – very strong typhoon which devastated the Philippines and eventually affected China, killing more than 300 people.

Loleng was retired by PAGASA after 1998; however, no replacement name was commissioned as the weather bureau released a new set of names in 2001.
