= List of storms named Louise =

The name Louise has been used for eleven tropical cyclones worldwide: ten in the Western Pacific Ocean and one in the South-West Indian Ocean.

In the Western Pacific Ocean:

- Typhoon Louise (1945), struck Japan
- Typhoon Louise (1951) (T5109), Category 4 typhoon
- Typhoon Louise (1955) (T5522), struck Japan. 54 people were killed and 14 were missing.
- Typhoon Louise (1959) (T5911, 22W), struck Taiwan and China
- Typhoon Louise (1962) (T6207, 45W), struck Japan
- Typhoon Louise (1964) (T6431, 46W, Ining), struck the Philippines
- Tropical Storm Louise (1967) (T6718, 19W), struck Japan
- Typhoon Louise (1970) (T7021, 23W)
- Typhoon Louise (1973) (T7313, 15W, Huling)
- Typhoon Louise (1976) (T7622, 23W)

In the South-West Indian Ocean:

- Cyclone Louise (1970)

== See also ==
- List of storms named Lois – a similar name that has been used in the Atlantic and Western Pacific tropical cyclone basins
- List of storms named Luis – a similar name that has also been used in the Atlantic and Western Pacific tropical cyclone basins
