= List of storms named Leo =

The name Leo has been used for three tropical cyclones worldwide: one in the West Pacific Ocean, one in the Australian region, and one in the South Pacific Ocean.

In the West Pacific:

- Typhoon Leo (1999) (T9902, 05W) – a Category 3-equivalent typhoon that affected Hong Kong.

In the Australian region:

- Cyclone Leo (1977) – a Category 4 severe tropical cyclone.

In the South Pacific:

- Cyclone Leo (2000) – a Category 2 tropical cyclone that affected French Polynesia.

== See also ==
- Storm Leonardo (2026) – a European windstorm with a similar name.
