= Typhoon Thelma (1987) =

Pacific typhoon

Typhoon Thelma (Katring)
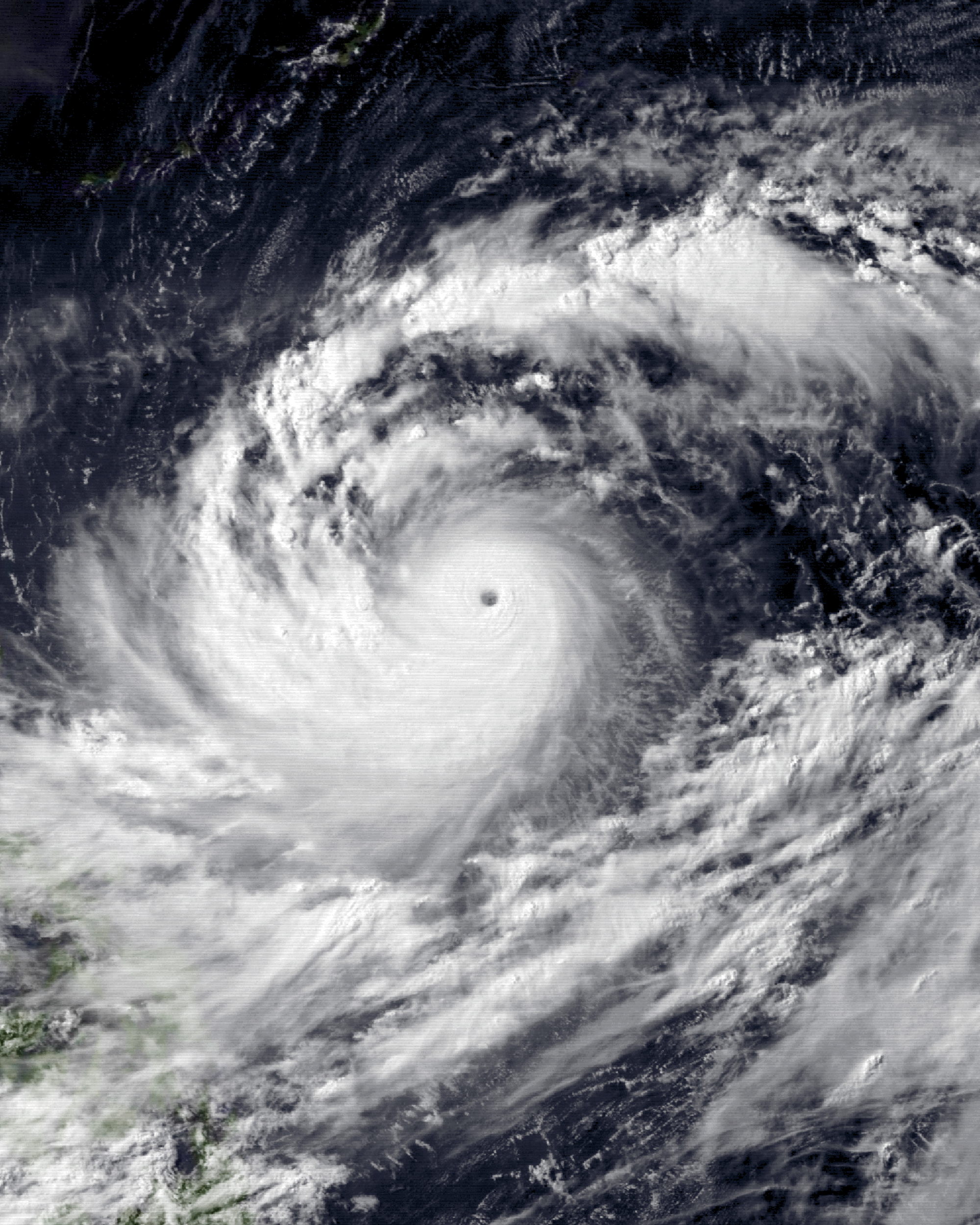
- Typhoon Thelma east of the Philippines near peak intensity on July 11

Meteorological history
- Formed: July 6, 1987
- Extratropical: July 16, 1987
- Dissipated: July 18, 1987

Very strong typhoon
- 10-minute sustained (JMA)
- Highest winds: 185 km/h (115 mph)
- Lowest pressure: 915 hPa (mbar); 27.02 inHg

Category 4-equivalent super typhoon
- 1-minute sustained (SSHWS/JTWC)
- Highest winds: 240 km/h (150 mph)
- Lowest pressure: 911 hPa (mbar); 26.90 inHg

Overall effects
- Fatalities: 138
- Damage: $272 million
- Areas affected: Philippines; South Korea; Japan
- IBTrACS
- Part of the 1987 Pacific typhoon season

Typhoon Thelma, known as Typhoon Katring by PAGASA, was the first super typhoon to form in the 1987 Pacific typhoon season. Forming from the monsoon trough in the Philippine Sea, Thelma intensified into a tropical cyclone on July 7. After moving north, Thelma turned west while remaining poorly organized. It intensified into a typhoon on July 9, soon after developing an eye, and began to intensify at a brisker clip. On the evening of July 10, Thelma attained maximum intensity while well to the east of the northern Philippines. It also turned sharply northward in response to a trough and slowly weakened. On July 15, Typhoon Thelma, now greatly reduced in intensity, struck the south coast of South Korea. The next day, Thelma dissipated shortly after emerging into the Sea of Japan.

Although Thelma remained well offshore the Philippines, around 500 homes were swept away due to flooding, which left more than 3,500 people homeless. A total of 130 people were rescued after a vessel sunk. Nationwide, 12 people perished. In Japan, the typhoon brought heavy rains that caused property damage in 19 prefectures. Throughout the country, three people died while around 1,000 dwellings were flooded.

Considered by the media to be the worst typhoon to hit South Korea in 28 years, Thelma brought widespread damage throughout the nation. Over 50 boats were sunk or damaged in Pusan, resulting in the loss of 150 people at sea. Overall, 8,881 buildings were damaged or destroyed across South Korea. Approximately 6,500 houses were demolished, leaving about 29,000 people without shelter. In addition, about 62,000 ha (153,205 acres) of farmland were flooded. A total of 3,879 vessels were damaged, including 2,829 that were destroyed or seriously damaged. This represented around 4% of the country's fishing fleet. Nationwide, 123 people were killed, 212 were rendered missing, and 114 were injured. In addition, damage totaled $272 million, of which property damage totaled $222 million. (Note: All damage totals are in 1987 United States dollars unless otherwise noted.) Due to the impact of the typhoon to South Korea, over 167,000 government workers, including thousands of military reserves, were mobilized to search for survivors and repair damage. In response of 100 farmers protesting over the slow timing of aid, the South Korean government agreed to provide $237 million in aid.

== Meteorological history ==
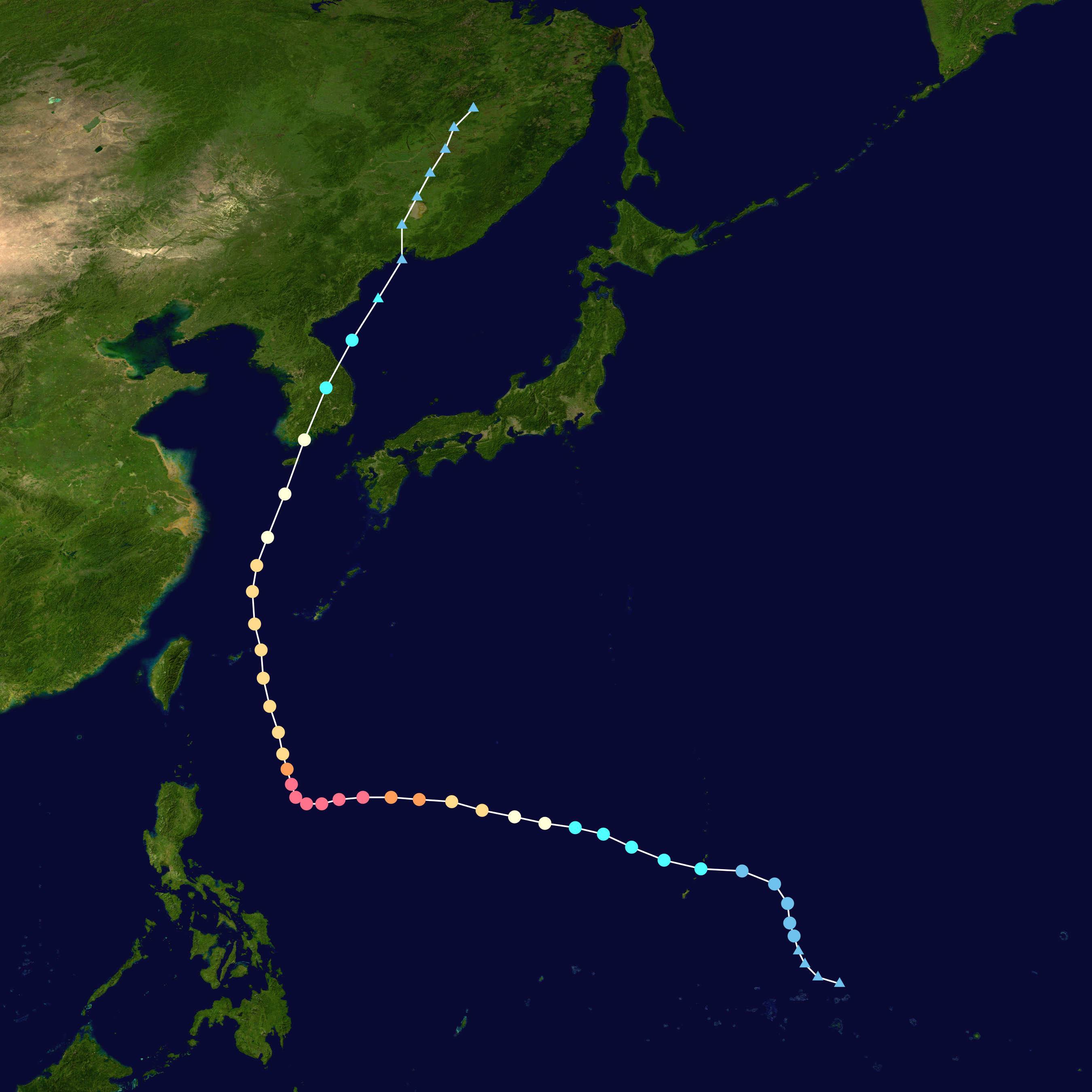
Map plotting the storm's track and intensity, according to the Saffir–Simpson scale Map key Saffir–Simpson scale Tropical depression (≤38 mph, ≤62 km/h) Tropical storm (39–73 mph, 63–118 km/h) Category 1 (74–95 mph, 119–153 km/h) Category 2 (96–110 mph, 154–177 km/h) Category 3 (111–129 mph, 178–208 km/h) Category 4 (130–156 mph, 209–251 km/h) Category 5 (≥157 mph, ≥252 km/h) Unknown Storm type Tropical cyclone Subtropical cyclone Extratropical cyclone, remnant low, tropical disturbance, or monsoon depression

Typhoon Thelma originated from the monsoon trough situated within the Philippine Sea. Although it was initially not well organized, the Joint Typhoon Warning Center (JTWC) started monitoring the system at 06:00 UTC on July 6 due to its well defined circulation. By that afternoon, organization Situated within a favorable environment of upper-level divergence, the Japan Meteorological Agency (JMA) started tracking the system early on July 7. (Note: The Japan Meteorological Agency is the official Regional Specialized Meteorological Center for the western Pacific Ocean.) Shortly thereafter, a Hurricane Hunter aircraft was successfully able to close off a circulation. Based on this, the JTWC issued a Tropical Cyclone Formation Alert (TCFA) for the system. At 18:00 UTC, the JTWC upgraded the system into a tropical depression, based on an increase in both convection and organization. Initially, the JTWC predicted the depression to move north near a weakness in a subtropical ridge, and then turned west as the ridge built back in.

Shortly after becoming a depression, the system quickly became elongated and lost organization. A Hurricane Hunter aircraft at 00:00 UTC on July 8 suggested that the depression had degenerated an open wave, with no closed surface circulation. Thirteen hours later, the system passed roughly 110 km (70 mi) north of Guam. After turning west while accelerating, the system began to organize, and the JTWC upgraded the depression into a tropical storm midday on July 8. Meanwhile, the JMA increased its intensity estimate to 90 km/h (55 mph). (Note: Wind estimates from the JMA and most other basins throughout the world are sustained over 10 minutes, while estimates from the United States-based Joint Typhoon Warning Center are sustained over 1 minute. 10-minute winds are about 1.14 times the amount of 1-minute winds.) Around this time, the Philippine Atmospheric, Geophysical and Astronomical Services Administration (PAGASA) also started to track the storm and assigned it with the local name Katring.

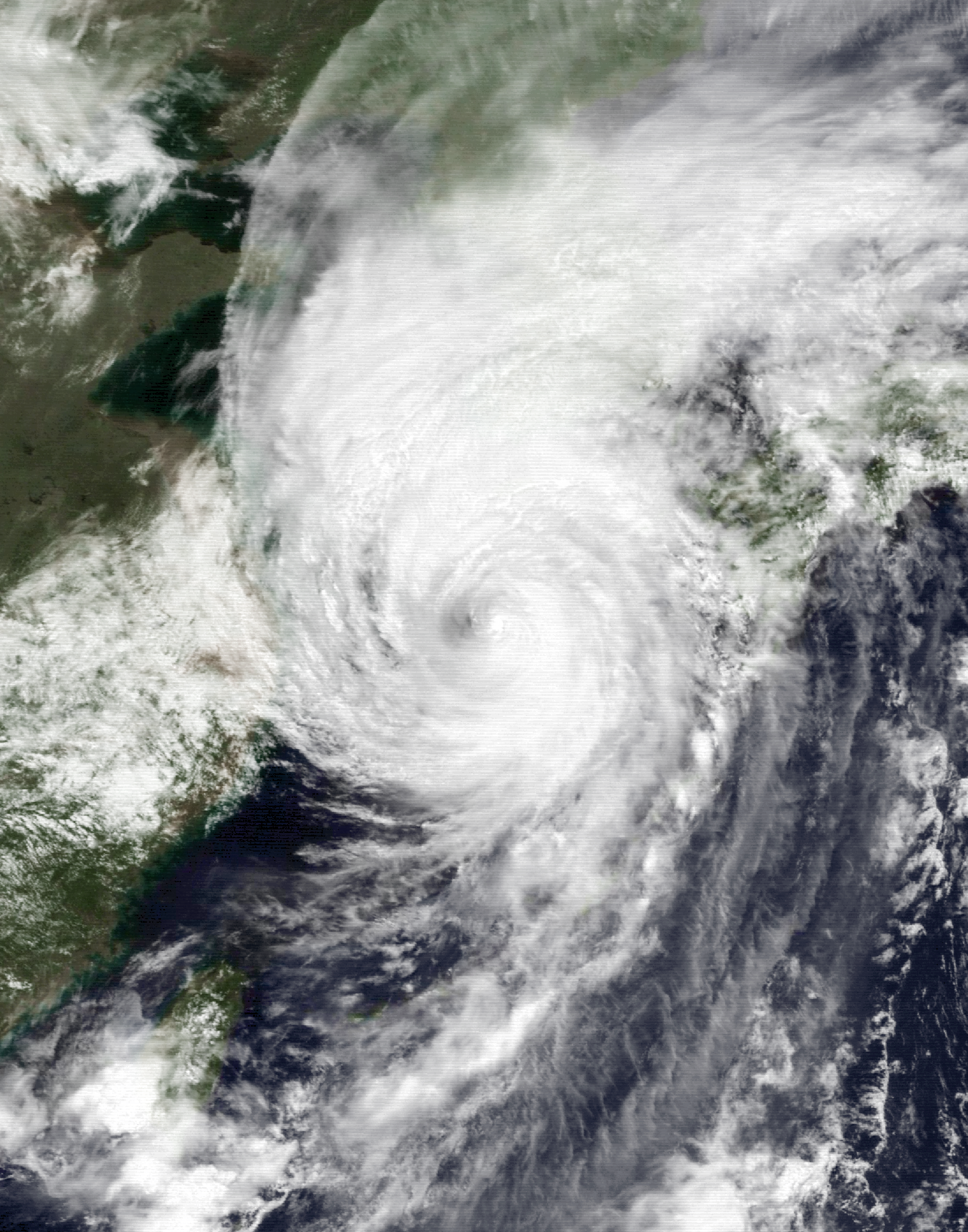
Typhoon Thelma approaching the Korean Peninsula on July 15

Despite being forecast by the JTWC to re-curve out to sea, Thelma veered west while slowly intensifying. Thus, a banding eye began to develop. Due to a combination of a Hurricane Hunter aircraft pass that estimated surface winds of 145 km/h (90 mph) and satellite-based Dvorak estimates, the JTWC upgraded Thelma into a typhoon at 0000 UTC on July 9. Six hours later, the JMA followed suit. Over the next 36 hours, Thelma entered a period of rapid deepening, and by 1800 UTC July 10, the JMA increased the intensity to 160 km/h (100 mph). During the following afternoon, the JTWC upgraded Thelma to a super typhoon, the first of the season, based on Dvorak-based satellite intensity estimates. At this time, the JMA estimated that Thelma attained its peak intensity, with winds of 185 km/h (115 mph) while the JTWC assessed the peak intensity of Thelma to 240 km/h (150 mph).

Shortly after attaining maximum intensity, cold tops surrounding the eye began to warm and poleward outflow became restricted to its north. On the evening of July 11, an aircraft reconnaissance flight noted an open eyewall and an increasingly elliptical eye. After abruptly turning north-northwest in response to a break in the ridge on July 12, steady weakening ensured. After traversing the East China Sea, Thelma passed near Okinawa on July 14 and then made landfall over southern Korea about 180 km (110 mi) west-southwest of Pusan on the evening of July 15. At the time of landfall, the JMA estimated winds of 145 km/h (90 mph). It then weakened rapidly while moving northeastwards across the Korean Peninsula. Early on July 16, Thelma entered the Sea of Japan and according to the JTWC, dissipated near Vladivostok, although its remnants were followed by the JMA for two more days.

== Preparations, impact, and aftermath ==
Although Thelma remained well offshore the Philippines, storm surge associated with its circulation swept away some 500 houses in the southern islands of the Philippines, leaving over 3,500 people homeless. Four people, including two women, drowned after their fishing boat capsized in the swollen San Jose River in Namolan. Offshore Negros, a vessel sunk, resulting in 130 people rescued and at least eight fatalities.

Across Japan, Thelma brought heavy rains, peaking at 1,185 mm (46.7 in) in Ebino, including 370 mm (15 in). Elsewhere, the city of Kumamoto received the highest 24 hour rainfall total in the nation, with 400 mm (16 in). The aforementioned heavy rains resulted in property damage in 19 states. Three people were killed. A young woman died when her car was inundated, and a middle school student died in a landslide, while a 41-year-old man perished after his automobile drowned. Overall, three people were hurt and over 1,000 homes were flooded.

=== South Korea ===
Initially, local meteorologists predicted Thelma would only brush the southern portion of the peninsula. As a result, many residents were unprepared when the storm struck. According to government officials, the lack of warning resulted in increased casualties and damage.

Although Thelma had weakened considerably prior to landfall, the typhoon was considered by press reports to be the worst to strike South Korea since 1959. Rainfall across the nation varied, but peaked at 270 mm (11 in) in Kangnung, resulting in rivers overflowing their banks. Damage was widespread, with the North Kyongsang and Kangwon provinces sustaining the worst effects of the system. In Pusan, the country's second-largest city, 16 people were killed and 50 boats sunk or were damaged due to storm surge by the city's port. Roughly 150 seamen and fishermen were initially reported as missing, including 23 from a 999 t (999,000 kg) freighter, Hanjin-ho, that capsized offshore, but by July 18, authorities had called off searches for the missing. Moreover, another 3,000 short tons (2,722 t) freighter also sunk due to the typhoon near Pusan, where nine crewmen were feared dead. Offshore Sinan, two people were confirmed to have perished, along with 23 others presumed dead after a large fishing trawler sunk. Elsewhere, four members of the same family died when their home was buried by a mudslide in Milyang. Seven members of one family were killed when their house was demolished by a mudslide in Kwangju, where 18 others were rescued due to flooding. At least 6,600 people had been displaced and 993 structures were demolished in South Kyongsang, where damage was estimated at $13 million. Along the southeastern portion of the nation, five casualties occurred due to a landslide.

Overall, 8,881 structures were damaged or destroyed across the nation. Approximately 6,500 dwellings were destroyed, and around 29,000 people were left homeless by the typhoon. In addition, about 62,000 ha (150,000 acres) of farmland were inundated. A total of 3,879 vessels were damaged by the system, 2,829 of which were destroyed or seriously damaged, and 100 capsized. This represented around 4% of the country's fishing fleet. In all, 123 people were killed, 212 were rendered missing, and 114 were injured. Nationwide, damage totaled $272 million, of which property damage totaled $222 million.

As a result of the impact, over 167,000 government workers, including thousands of military reserves, were mobilized to search for survivors, as well as repair roads, waterways, buildings, and power lines. Most of the homeless were housed in relief centers. Approximately 100 angry farmers blocked a road with vehicles near the southern town of Sanchong to complain that they were not getting emergency aid faster enough and also demanded full compensation for destroyed homes and crops. In response, the government agreed to provide $237 million in aid, $25 million of which came from the federal government, and the rest was raised via bonds. Fishermen and farmers who suffered property losses were allowed to borrow up to a $3,720-interest free loan from banks and were also awarded a tax break. The government also paid $3,720 to the families of those who died.

== See also ==
- Typhoon Dinah (1987) – another strong typhoon which impacted South Korea more than a month after Thelma
