= Typhoon Vera (1986) =

Pacific typhoon in 1986

Typhoon Vera (Loleng)
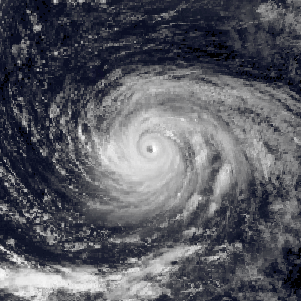
- Typhoon Vera at peak intensity on August 22

Meteorological history
- Formed: August 13, 1986
- Dissipated: August 29, 1986

Very strong typhoon
- 10-minute sustained (JMA)
- Highest winds: 165 km/h (105 mph)
- Lowest pressure: 925 hPa (mbar); 27.32 inHg

Category 3-equivalent typhoon
- 1-minute sustained (SSHWS/JTWC)
- Highest winds: 205 km/h (125 mph)
- Lowest pressure: 923 hPa (mbar); 27.26 inHg

Overall effects
- Fatalities: 60 total
- Damage: $22 million (1986 USD)
- Areas affected: Okinawa, China, South Korea, Russia
- Part of the 1986 Pacific typhoon season

Typhoon Vera, known as Typhoon Loleng in the Philippines, affected Okinawa, China, and South Korea during August 1986. A tropical depression formed on August 13 and attained tropical storm intensity later that day. Initially, Vera meandered in the monsoon trough. On August 17, however, the system abruptly re-formed to east-northeast, and subsequently began to move east and then north. Vera became a typhoon on August 20, and peaked in intensity two days later. Typhoon Vera then turned west-northwest and slowly weakened as it approached Okinawa. After passing near the island, Vera turned north as it tracked east of China. The typhoon made landfall on South Korea on August 28 as a tropical storm, and the next day, transitioned into an extratropical cyclone.

The typhoon was responsible for minor damage to Okinawa, where 20,000 houses lost power and one fatality was reported. Although the core remained offshore China, over 500 homes were destroyed, 7 people died, and 28 people were hurt in Shanghai. Nationwide, 1,400 power lines were cut and eight fatalities were reported. Across South Korea, a total of 1,852 structures were damaged and 384 others were destroyed, which left 6,623 people without shelter. The storm also wrecked 929 boats and damaged 37 ports. A total of 9,145 hectares (22,600 acres) of farmland were flooded. Damage totaled $22 million (1986 USD). Nationwide, 26 people were killed and 81 others were injured. In addition to the aforementioned casualties, 25 individuals were feared dead after the ship New Genshine went missing.

== Meteorological history ==
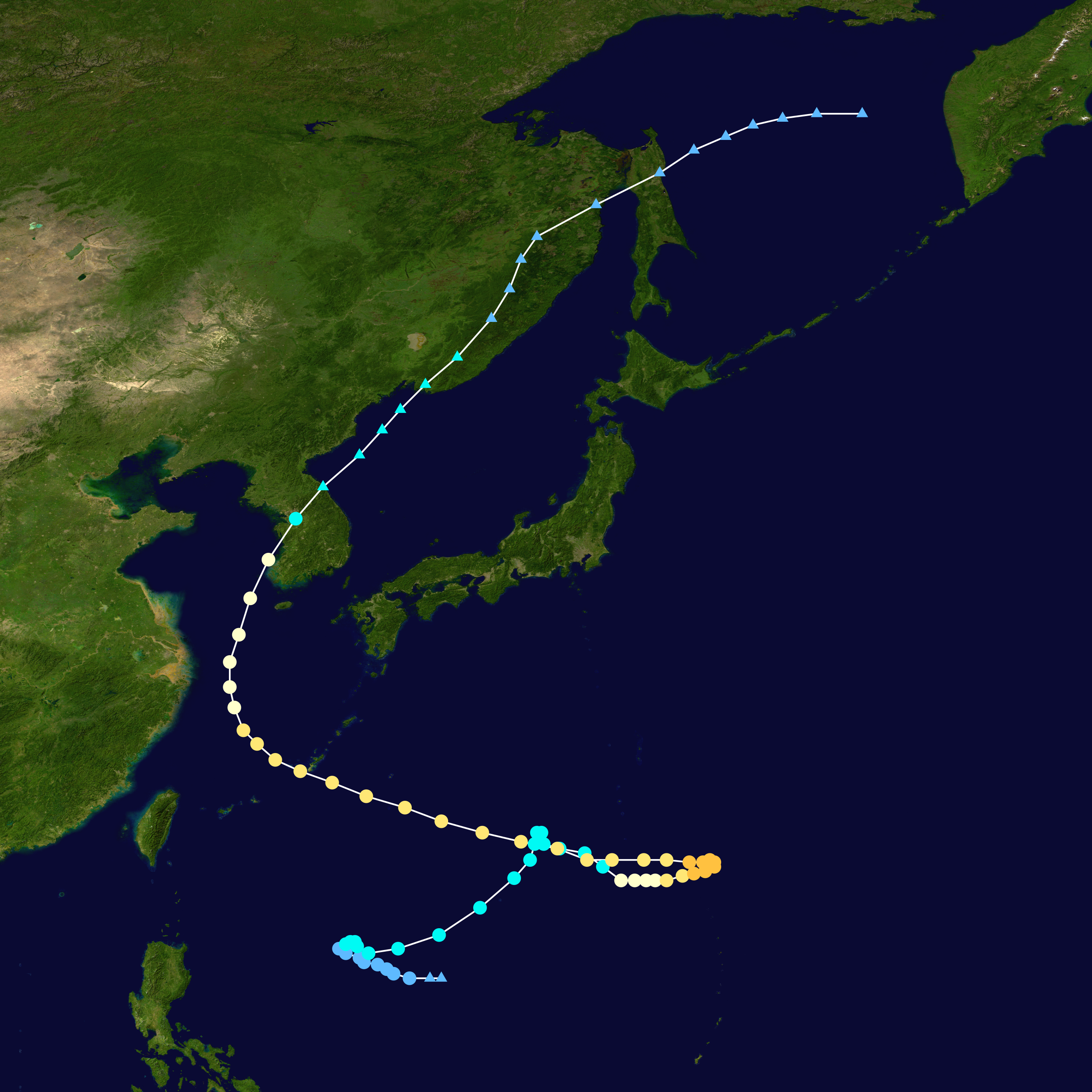
Map plotting the storm's track and intensity, according to the Saffir–Simpson scale Map key Saffir–Simpson scale Tropical depression (≤38 mph, ≤62 km/h) Tropical storm (39–73 mph, 63–118 km/h) Category 1 (74–95 mph, 119–153 km/h) Category 2 (96–110 mph, 154–177 km/h) Category 3 (111–129 mph, 178–208 km/h) Category 4 (130–156 mph, 209–251 km/h) Category 5 (≥157 mph, ≥252 km/h) Unknown Storm type Tropical cyclone Subtropical cyclone Extratropical cyclone, remnant low, tropical disturbance, or monsoon depression

Typhoon Vera formed from the most intense monsoon trough, which extended from the International Date Line to the Philippines, observed in the basin since 1974. Despite outflow from Tropical Storm Georgette, an area of low pressure embedded in the monsoon was first identified near Yap on August 12. Because the disturbance was one of many disturbances within the monsoon trough being tracked by the Joint Typhoon Warning Center (JTWC), a defined low-level circulation was difficult to spot on weather satellite imagery. At 00:00 UTC on August 13, the Japan Meteorological Agency (JMA) declared the system a tropical depression, (Note: The Japan Meteorological Agency is the official Regional Specialized Meteorological Center for the western Pacific Ocean.) after its center had become better defined. The persistence of deep convection prompted the JTWC to issue a Tropical Cyclone Formation Alert during the early morning hours of August 14. Over the next 24 hours, the disturbance became better organized, and midday on August 15, the JTWC upgraded it into a tropical depression. Six hours later, the JMA upgraded the system into a tropical storm. (Note: Wind estimates from the JMA and most other basins throughout the world are sustained over 10 minutes, while estimates from the United States-based Joint Typhoon Warning Center are sustained over 1 minute. 10-minute winds are about 1.14 times the amount of 1-minute winds.) At 00:00 UTC on August 16, the JTWC upgraded the depression into a tropical storm, based on reports of 65 km/h (40 mph) winds from a Hurricane Hunter aircraft.

Tropical Storm Vera was initially expected to move west-northwest due to a strengthening subtropical ridge to the north; however, the storm continued to meander in the monsoon trough instead. A Hurricane Hunter aircraft on the afternoon of August 16 failed to identify a low-level circulation. Satellite imagery on August 17 suggested that the storm's center became elongated. By 12:00 UTC on August 17, however, a new circulation had become evident around 670 km (415 mi) to the east-northeast and quickly became Vera's dominant circulation. Post-season analysis from the JTWC indicated that the development of a separate circulation represented a new tropical cyclone; however, the JMA considers the two circulations of Vera to be one continuous cyclone. Initially, the re-developed system continued to meander, while maintaining minimal tropical storm strength. Vera then began to drift eastward under the influence of a trough located to the east of the monsoonal flow. Early on August 20, both the JTWC and the JMA classified Vera as a typhoon. On August 21, a ridge began to build towards the storm's east, forcing Vera to turn north. On August 22, the JTWC estimated that Vera attained its peak intensity of 200 km/h (125 mph) while the JMA estimated a peak of 170 km/h (105 mph). Around this time, the typhoon passed about 540 km (335 mi) southwest of Iwo Jima.

Not long after attaining peak intensity, Typhoon Vera turned westward in the general direction of Okinawa. The storm weakened as it approached land, and late on August 25, Vera tracked directly over the island, with both the JTWC and JMA estimating winds of 160 km/h (100 mph). Vera's motion began to slow as the storm rounded a subtropical ridge to its north, and after reaching the western periphery of the ridge at 06:00 UTC on August 26, Vera turned to the northwest, and later to the north. Meanwhile, Vera began to lose tropical characteristics and transition into an extratropical cyclone. After passing almost 300 km (185 mi) east of Shanghai, Vera continued to weaken due to decreased outflow that was previously aided by the storm's connection to the monsoon trough. Midday on August 28, Vera made landfall near the Kunsan Air Base in South Korea as a tropical storm. At 18:00 UTC, Vera cleared the Korean Peninsula. After accelerating towards the northeast, the JTWC estimated that Vera completed its transition on the morning of August 29, although the JMA continued to watch its remnants until September 2.

== Preparations and impact ==
=== Japan ===
The JTWC accurately predicted that the typhoon would strike Okinawa 66 hours in advance. As a result of the long lead times, authorities in the island were able to take precautions well in advance. All scheduled flights between Okinawa and the Japanese main islands were cancelled and inter-island ferry service was suspended. Due to the advance warning, damage on Okinawa was slight, although 30,000 customers lost power. The typhoon dropped heavy rains, peaking at Yabitsudake, where 674 mm (26.5 in) of rain fell. Within a 24-hour time span, Mount Yonaha received the greatest amount of rainfall, with a total of 330 mm (13 in). Hongawa received 61 mm (2.4 in) of rain in an hour, the highest hourly rainfall total measured during the storm. On Kadena Air Base, a wind gust of 156 km/h (97 mph) was measured. Forty people were evacuated due to high waves in Kunigami. Offshore, high seas disrupted several ships, including the 464 short tons (420 t) Tatong, which sent a signal of distress. A 30-year-old man was killed after being struck by a heavy rope while preparing for the storm. Throughout Okinawa, five houses were flooded and two walls beside a road collapsed.

=== China ===
Due to the impending threat of Vera to Shanghai, more than 3,000 ships were piloted into port and 120 pumping stations were readied to avert potential flooding. Furthermore, 20,000 cruise passengers were evacuated to shelter. Despite tracking east of Shanghai, seven people were killed and twenty-eight others were injured in the city. The New China News Agency reported that over 500 homes were destroyed. There were also a total of 25 accidents and the storm disrupted power supplies in 1,000 different locations across the city. A total of 3,000 emergency workers were recalled to restore electrical supplies across Shanghai. In nearby Shengshi Qunado, one person was killed, and 70 fishing boats sunk. Nationwide, 500 homes were destroyed, eight others were damaged, 1,400 power lines were cut, and eight people were killed.

=== South Korea ===
Prior to striking South Korea, a storm alert was declared for the entire country. Medical teams acquired tents, blankets, and other emergency supplies ready to hurry to stricken areas. Greater than 2,400 schools across South Korea closed, and thousands of fishing boats took shelter in ports. All domestic airline flights and ferry services were halted, stranding more than 2,000 tourists on Cheju Island alone. However, international flights out of Seoul, except those to Japan, were unaffected by Vera. For two days, the typhoon drenched South Korea, with much of the country receiving 100 to 200 mm (4 to 8 in) of precipitation. The highest rainfall total recorded in the country occurred in Cheju Island, where 340 mm (13.4 in) was recorded and hundreds were left homeless. At the Taegu Air Base, more than 75 trees fell, which damaged roofs of many homes and power lines. Over 100 industrial plants along the nation's southern coast were forced to stop operation for two hours after 13 transmission towers collapsed. Access to water supplies in the nearby cities of Pusan and Yosu was temporarily revoked, stranding hundreds of tourists. Six boats sunk, including three offshore Pusan. A 2,908 short tons (2,638 t) ship, the New Genshine, went missing due to the typhoon; the vessel's 25 member crew was later presumed dead.

Nationwide, a total of 1,852 structures were damaged, and 384 others were demolished, which resulted in 6,623 homeless. The storm also wrecked 929 fishing boats and damaged 37 ports. A total of 9,145 ha (22,600 acres) of farmland were flooded. Eight people were confirmed to have been killed while eighteen others were reported missing and feared dead and 81 individuals were injured. Damage amounted to $22 million, including $4.3 million in property damage. Almost immediately following the storm, the Government of South Korea ordered the military to provide assistance to help in the cleanup as early as possible. In the Soviet Far East, 40,000 ha (98,840 acres) of farmland was flooded, primarily near Vladivostok.

== See also ==
- Typhoon Gerald
- Typhoon Thelma (1987)
- Typhoon Hal (1985)
