= List of storms named Lorraine =

The name Lorraine has been used for three tropical cyclones in the Eastern Pacific Ocean:

- Tropical Storm Lorraine (1966)
- Hurricane Lorraine (1970)
- Tropical Storm Lorraine (1974)
