= List of storms named Lorna =

The name Lorna has been used for nine tropical cyclones worldwide, eight in the Western Pacific Ocean and one in the South-West Indian Ocean.

In the Western Pacific:

- Typhoon Lorna (1954) (T5414) – struck Japan and caused widespread damage in the Greater Tokyo Area.
- Typhoon Lorna (1958) (T5826) – threatened the Philippines before recurving into sea.
- Typhoon Lorna (1961) (T6116, 42W) – struck Taiwan and China.
- Tropical Storm Lorna (1964) (T6415, 18W) – a weak, short-lived tropical storm which stayed at sea.
- Typhoon Lorna (1966) (T6630, 32W, Titang) – struck northeastern Philippines.
- Tropical Storm Lorna (1969) (T6918, 22W, Saling) – also threatened the Philippines before dissipating.
- Typhoon Lorna (1972) (T7223, 25W) – struck Hainan and northern Vietnam.
- Tropical Storm Lorna (1976) (T7602, 2W) – early-season storm which did not affect land.

In the South-West Indian Ocean:

- Cyclone Lorna (2019) – the final tropical cyclone of the 2018–19 South-West Indian Ocean cyclone season.
