= List of storms named Laurie =

The name Laurie has been used for two tropical cyclones worldwide.

In the Atlantic Ocean:

- Hurricane Laurie (1969) – a hurricane that looped in the Gulf of Mexico and struck Mexico twice.

In the South Pacific Ocean:

- Cyclone Laurie (1976) – a short-lived tropical cyclone in the South Pacific
