= List of storms named Laurence =

The name Laurence has been used for two tropical cyclones in the Australian region of the Southern Hemisphere.

- Cyclone Laurence (1990) – a weak tropical cyclone to the north of Western Australia.
- Cyclone Laurence (2009) – a powerful cyclone that struck Western Australia three times.
