= List of storms named Longwang =

The name Longwang (Mandarin: 龙王, [lʊŋ˧˥ wɑŋ˧˥]) has been used for two tropical cyclones in the Western Pacific Ocean. The name was contributed by China and refers to the Dragon King, god of rain and storms, in Mandarin.

- Tropical Storm Longwang (2000) (T0002, 02W, Biring) – developed over the northern Philippines and moved northeastward over the open ocean.
- Typhoon Longwang (2005) (T0519, 19W, Maring) – a deadly Category 4 typhoon that made landfall on Taiwan and then in Fujian Province, China.

The name Longwang was retired after the 2005 Pacific typhoon season and was replaced with Haikui.
