= List of storms named Lin =

The name Lin has been used for two tropical cyclones in the South Pacific region of the Southern Hemisphere:

- Cyclone Lin (1993) – a tropical cyclone that passed near Samoa.
- Cyclone Lin (2009) – a tropical cyclone that passed near Tonga.
