= List of storms named Lana =

The name Lana has been used for two tropical cyclones: one in the Central Pacific Ocean and one in the West Pacific Ocean.

In the Central Pacific:

- Tropical Storm Lana (2009) – did not affect land.

In the West Pacific:

- Typhoon Lana (1948) (T4802) – a Category 1-equivalent typhoon that killed 18 people in Yap.

== See also ==
Storms with similar names

- Cyclone Luana (2026) – an Australian region tropical cyclone.
