= List of storms named Lex =

The name Lex was used for three tropical cyclones in the Northwestern Pacific Ocean:

- Typhoon Lex (1980) – a typhoon that passed east of Japan.
- Tropical Storm Lex (1983) – a tropical storm that struck Vietnam, killing 200 people.
- Tropical Storm Lex (1986) – a tropical storm that passed through the Marianas Islands.
