= List of storms named Lottie =

The name Lottie was used for one tropical cyclones in the Australian region and one in the South-West Indian Ocean.

In the South-West Indian Ocean:

- Tropical Depression Lottie (1968) – a short-lived tropical depression in the south-west Indian Ocean.

In the Australian region:

- Cyclone Natalie-Lottie (1973) – a tropical cyclone that capsized the ship Uluilakeba, killing 85 people.
