= List of storms named Love =

The name Love has been used for two tropical cyclones in the Atlantic Ocean:

- Hurricane Love (1947) – a hurricane that passed close to Bermuda.
- Hurricane Love (1950) – a hurricane in the Gulf of Mexico that struck Florida as a tropical storm.
