= List of storms named Lena =

The name Lena has been used for three tropical cyclones in the Australian region:

- Cyclone Lena (1971) – a Category 2 tropical cyclone off northeastern Australia.
- Cyclone Lena (1983) – a Category 3 severe tropical cyclone that struck Port Hedland, Western Australia.
- Cyclone Lena (1993) – a Category 2 tropical cyclone between Western Australia and Indonesia.

== See also ==
- Tropical Storm Rena (1949) – a West Pacific Ocean tropical cyclone with a similar name.
