= List of storms named Lusing =

The name Lusing was used for ten tropical cyclones by the Philippine Atmospheric, Geophysical and Astronomical Services Administration (PAGASA) and its predecessor, the Philippine Weather Bureau, in the Western Pacific Ocean.

- Typhoon Elsie (1964) (T6408, 10W, Lusing) – a strong typhoon which struck central Luzon, causing widespread flooding.
- Typhoon Wendy (1968) (T6812, 16W, Lusing) – an intense typhoon that weakened before affecting northern Philippines, Taiwan and South China.
- Tropical Depression Lusing (1972) – a tropical depression only recognized by PAGASA and the Joint Typhoon Warning Center (JTWC).
- Severe Tropical Storm Violet (1976) (T7610, 10W, Lusing) – a fairly strong tropical storm which hit Hainan, claiming 2 lives.
- Typhoon Ida (1980) (T8007, 08W, Lusing) – a system which was only considered by the JTWC as a tropical storm and passed south of Taiwan before making landfall in mainland China.
- Tropical Depression 12W (1984) (12W, Lusing) – short-lived tropical depression which remained at sea.
- Tropical Storm Jeff (1988) (T8820, 16W, Lusing) – a tropical storm which affected no land areas.
- Typhoon Omar (1992) (T9215, 15W, Lusing) – the strongest and costliest typhoon to make landfall in Guam in 16 years; also affected the Philippines, Taiwan and East China, causing a total of 15 fatalities.
- Typhoon Niki (1996) (T9613, 18W, Lusing) – a relatively powerful typhoon that crossed the Philippines, Hainan and northern Vietnam in mid-August 1996.
- Typhoon Prapiroon (2000) (T0012, 20W, Lusing) – a relatively minimal typhoon which caused 75 fatalities and incurred more than $6 billion USD in damages, becoming the costliest to impact the Korean Peninsula.

After the 2000 Pacific typhoon season, the PAGASA revised their naming lists, and the name Lusing was excluded.
