= List of storms named Lusi =

The name Lusi has been used for three tropical cyclones in the South Pacific Ocean:

- Cyclone Lusi (1986) – a weak tropical cyclone near Vanuatu.
- Cyclone Lusi (1997) – a tropical cyclone that brushed Fiji.
- Cyclone Lusi (2014) – a tropical cyclone that affected Fiji and New Zealand.
