= List of storms named Lindsay =

The name Lindsay has been used for two tropical cyclones in the Australian region of the Southern Hemisphere.

- Cyclone Lindsay (1985) – a Category 3 severe tropical cyclone that struck Broome, Western Australia.
- Cyclone Lindsay (1996) – a Category 1 tropical cyclone which formed southwest of Indonesia.
