= List of storms named Lola =

The name Lola has been used for 18 tropical cyclones worldwide. Fifteen were in the West Pacific Ocean, two in the South Pacific Ocean, and one in the South-West Indian Ocean.

In the West Pacific:

- Typhoon Lola (1953) (T5305) – a Category 1-equivalent typhoon
- Typhoon Lola (1957) (T5721) – a Category 5-equivalent super typhoon
- Typhoon Lola (1960) (T6023, 48W) – a Category 1-equivalent typhoon that killed 58 people in the Philippines
- Typhoon Lola (1963) (T6319, 36W) – a Category 4-equivalent super typhoon
- Tropical Storm Lola (1966) (T6605, 05W) – made landfall near Hong Kong
- Typhoon Lola (1968) (T6824, 29W) – a Category 3-equivalent typhoon
- Typhoon Lola (1972) (T7202, 03W) – a Category 3-equivalent typhoon that caused a drinking water shortage in Micronesia
- Typhoon Lola (1975) (T7501, 01W, Auring) – a Category 1-equivalent typhoon that made landfall in Mindanao and caused 30 fatalities
- Typhoon Lola (1978) (T7821, 22W) – a Category 1-equivalent typhoon that affected the Philippines and China
- Typhoon Lola (1979) (T7913, 16W) – a Category 2-equivalent typhoon that did not affect land
- Tropical Storm Lola (1982) (T8220, 21W) – did not affect land
- Typhoon Lola (1986) (T8603, 03W) – a Category 5-equivalent super typhoon that became Pohnpei's most destructive cyclone since 1958
- Tropical Storm Ken–Lola (1989; T8912, 13W / 14W) – operationally considered two separate storms
- Tropical Storm Lola (1990) (T9024, 26W) – caused 23 fatalities in Vietnam
- Typhoon Lola (1993; T9326, 35W, Monang) – a Category 3-equivalent typhoon that caused 273 fatalities in the Philippines and 96 fatalities in Vietnam

In the South Pacific:

- Cyclone Lola (2005) – a Category 1 tropical cyclone
- Cyclone Lola (2023) – a Category 5 severe tropical cyclone that became the strongest off-season Southern Hemisphere tropical cyclone and affected Vanuatu

The name Lola was retired after the 2023–24 season and was replaced with Lute.

In the South-West Indian:

- Tropical Storm Lola (2008) – a moderate tropical storm that did not affect land

== See also ==
Storms with similar names

- Typhoon Halola (2015) – a Category 2-equivalent typhoon that originated in the Central Pacific
