= List of storms named Lynn =

The name Lynn has been used for three tropical cyclones in the Northwestern Pacific Ocean.

- Tropical Storm Lynn (1981) (T8107, 05W, Elang) – traversed the Philippines and Hainan Island before striking Vietnam
- Tropical Storm Lynn (1984) (T8416, 16W) – made landfall in Vietnam
- Typhoon Lynn (1987) (T8722, 21W, Pepang) – violent typhoon that caused flooding in the Philippines and Taiwan before making landfall in South China
