= List of storms named Lois =

The name Lois has been used for four tropical cyclones worldwide: one in the Atlantic and three in the West Pacific Ocean.

In the Atlantic Ocean:

- Hurricane Lois (1966) – a hurricane in the Atlantic that passed west of the Azores.

In the Western Pacific Ocean:

- Typhoon Lois (1952) – a typhoon that struck Hainan and Vietnam.
- Tropical Storm Lois (1992) – a tropical storm that passed east of Japan.
- Tropical Storm Lois (1995) – a severe tropical storm that struck Vietnam.

== See also ==
- List of storms named Louise – a similar name that has been used in the Atlantic and South-West Indian Ocean tropical cyclone basins
- List of storms named Luis – a similar name that has been used in the Atlantic and Western Pacific tropical cyclone basins
