= List of storms named Liza =

The name Liza has been used for four tropical cyclones in the Eastern Pacific Ocean:

- Tropical Storm Liza (1961) – did not affect land
- Hurricane Liza (1968) – a Category 1 hurricane that swept hundreds of swimmers in California into the ocean
- Tropical Storm Liza (1972) – did not affect land
- Hurricane Liza (1976) – a Category 4 hurricane that made landfall in Mexico, becoming the worst disaster in the history of Baja California Sur and the third-deadliest Pacific hurricane on record (causing 1,236 fatalities)

== See also ==
- List of storms named Lisa – a similar name that has been used in five tropical cyclone basins
