= Tropical Storm Zita =

Pacific severe tropical storm in 1997

Tropical Storm Zita (Luming)
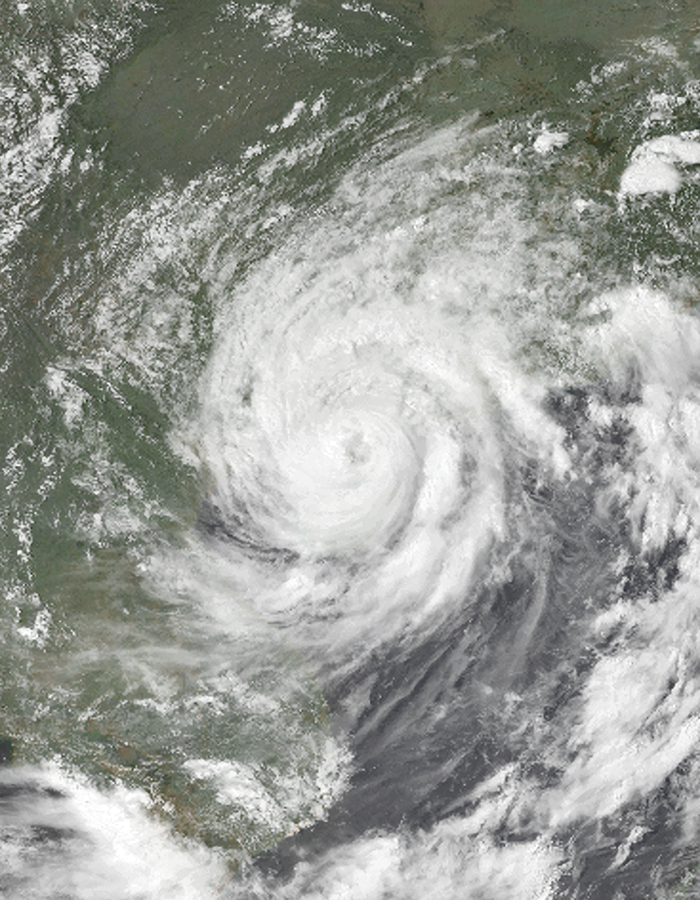
- Tropical Storm Zita at peak intensity over the Leizhou Peninsula

Meteorological history
- Formed: August 20, 1997
- Dissipated: August 24, 1997

Severe tropical storm
- 10-minute sustained (JMA)
- Highest winds: 100 km/h (65 mph)
- Lowest pressure: 980 hPa (mbar); 28.94 inHg

Category 1-equivalent typhoon
- 1-minute sustained (SSHWS/JTWC)
- Highest winds: 140 km/h (85 mph)
- Lowest pressure: 980 hPa (mbar); 28.94 inHg

Overall effects
- Fatalities: 7 confirmed, 345 reported
- Damage: $438 million (1997 USD)
- Areas affected: Southern China, Hong Kong, Vietnam, Laos and Thailand
- IBTrACS
- Part of the 1997 Pacific typhoon season

Severe Tropical Storm Zita, known in the Philippines as Tropical Storm Luming, was a short-lived tropical cyclone that killed seven people throughout southern China in August 1997. Originating from a tropical disturbance over the South China Sea on August 19, Zita tracked westward as it quickly strengthened within a region of light wind shear, attaining winds of 140 km/h (85 mph) as it made landfall along the Leizhou Peninsula early on August 22. Maintaining this intensity, the storm made a second landfall in northern Vietnam later that day before rapidly weakening over land. The remnants of Zita were last noted over extreme northwestern Vietnam on August 24.

Although a relatively weak system, Tropical Storm Zita caused significant damage in Southern China. There, seven people were known to have been killed by the storm and damage reached $433 million (1997 USD). However, a report from Dartmouth College states that 345 people were killed by the storm. In Vietnam, significantly less damage took place; no fatalities were reported and losses reached $5 million (1997 USD).

== Meteorological history ==
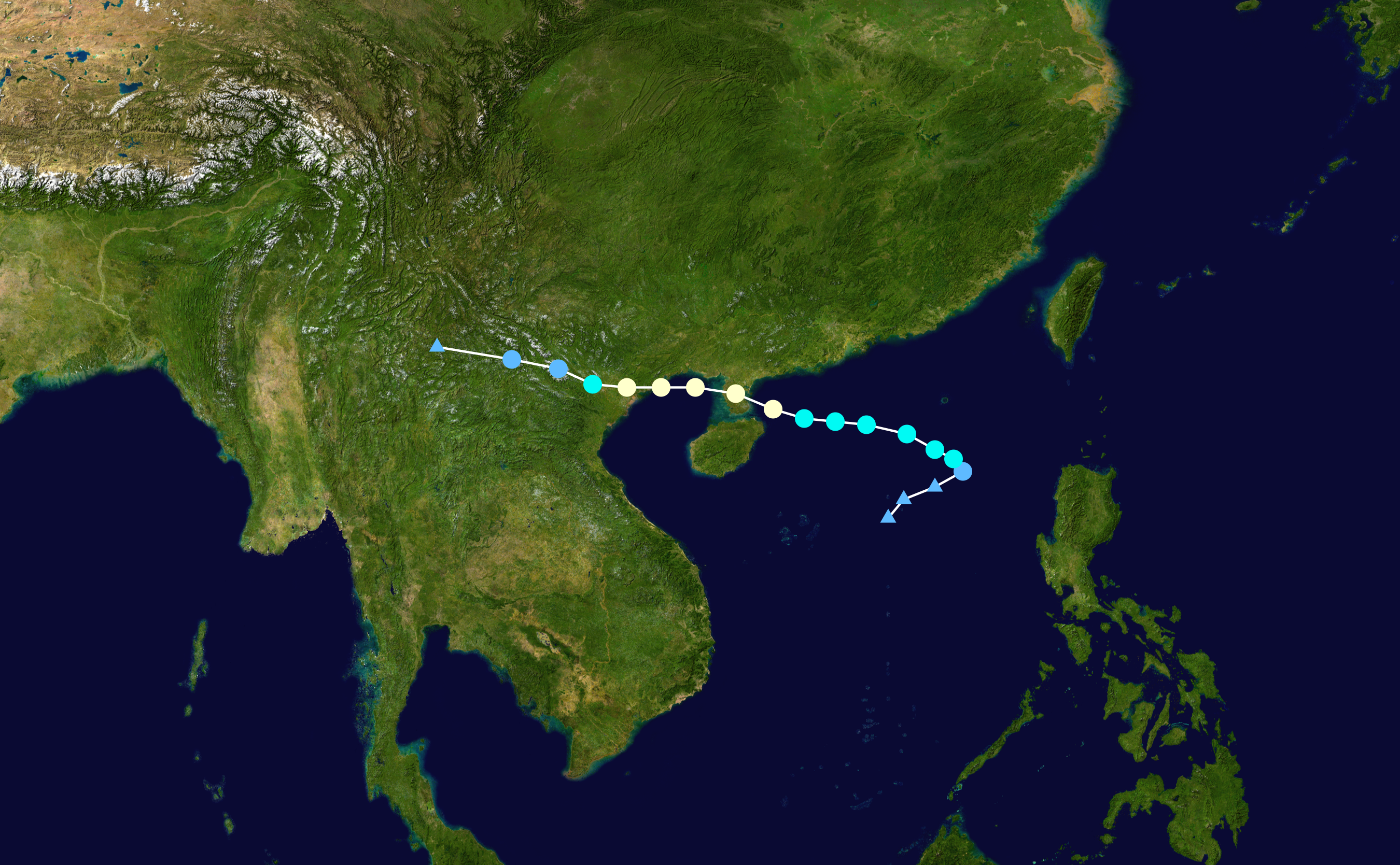
Map plotting the storm's track and intensity, according to the Saffir–Simpson scale Map key Saffir–Simpson scale Tropical depression (≤38 mph, ≤62 km/h) Tropical storm (39–73 mph, 63–118 km/h) Category 1 (74–95 mph, 119–153 km/h) Category 2 (96–110 mph, 154–177 km/h) Category 3 (111–129 mph, 178–208 km/h) Category 4 (130–156 mph, 209–251 km/h) Category 5 (≥157 mph, ≥252 km/h) Unknown Storm type Tropical cyclone Subtropical cyclone Extratropical cyclone, remnant low, tropical disturbance, or monsoon depression

Severe Tropical Storm Zita originated from a tropical disturbance over the South China Sea which was first identified by the JTWC on August 19, 1997, roughly 555 km (345 mi) west of the northern Philippines. By August 20, a low-level circulation developed and deep convection persisted around the center. Situated within an easterly flow, the system tracked westward towards the southern Chinese island of Hainan as it strengthened. Later that day, a Tropical Cyclone Formation Alert was issued for the disturbance; around the same time, the Japan Meteorological Agency (JMA) began monitoring the system as a tropical depression. Hours later, the JTWC classified the depression as Tropical Storm Zita, the 15th named storm of the season. Early the next day, the JMA followed suit and upgraded Zita to a tropical storm according to ten-minute sustained wind standards. Additionally, the Philippine Atmospheric, Geophysical and Astronomical Services Administration issued a few advisories on the system as it existed within their area of responsibility, during which time it was given the local Filipino name Luming.

Situated in a region with little to no wind shear, the storm's outflow quickly became established and banding features wrapped around the periphery. Despite Zita's proximity to China's coastline, it was able to intensify into a typhoon by August 22, attaining winds of 120 km/h (75 mph), equivalent to a Category 1 hurricane on the Saffir–Simpson hurricane scale. Strengthening continued until Zita made landfall along the Leizhou Peninsula around 0600 UTC with winds of 140 km/h (85 mph). At landfall, the JMA assessed the storm to have been slightly weaker, estimating it to have peaked as a severe tropical storm with ten-minute sustained winds of 100 km/h (60 mph) and a barometric pressure of 980 mbar (hPa; 28.94 inHg). Although the storm moved over land, it maintained its intensity as it entered the Gulf of Tonkin. Around 2200 UTC, Zita made its final landfall near Cẩm Phả, Vietnam. Rapid weakening ensued as it moved further inland. Early on August 23, the JTWC issued their final advisory on the storm as it weakened to a tropical depression. However, the JMA continued to monitor Zita until it dissipated early on August 24 over extreme northwestern Vietnam.

== Impact ==
Prior to the storm's arrival in China, officials evacuated roughly 54,000 people from dangerous areas. In southern China, Tropical Storm Zita produced torrential rainfall across Guangdong Province, triggering widespread flooding and landslides. At least seven are known to have been killed in the province and damage reached $433 million (1997 USD). However, a report from Dartmouth College states that 345 people were killed by the storm. Roughly An estimated 55,170 km^{2} (21,300 mi^{2}) of land was affected by the storm-induced floods, home to roughly 5.65 million people. In the city of Zhanjiang alone, 36,000 homes were destroyed and 80% of the coastal crops were lost. Throughout the Leizhou Peninsula, 332,650 hectares (822,000 acres) of farmland were damaged by the storm.

In Hong Kong, the outer bands of Zita brought significant rainfall, measured at 326.7 mm (12.86 in), which triggered 19 landslides. High winds downed power lines, leaving an estimated 1,900 people without power at the height of the storm. Throughout the city, damage amounted to HK$550,000 (US$70,747). In Vietnam, the storm produced widespread heavy rainfall, leaving $5 million (1997 USD) in damage but no fatalities. Zita's remnants also brought significant rainfall to parts of neighboring Laos.

== See also ==
- Tropical Storm Koguma
- Typhoon Mujigae (2015)
- Tropical Storm Mujigae (2009)
- Tropical Storm Dianmu (2016)
- Tropical Storm Jebi (2013)
