= Typhoon Pat (1985) =

Pacific typhoon in 1985

Typhoon Pat (Luming)
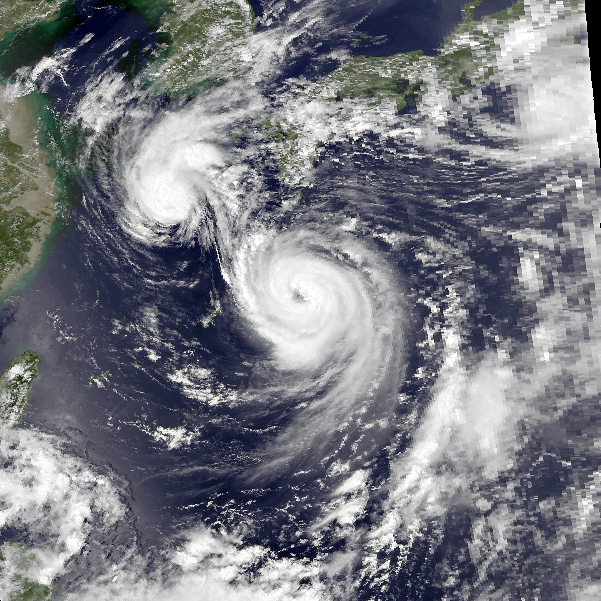
- Typhoon Pat (middle) during its Fujiwhara interactions with Odessa (left) and Ruby (top-right) on August 30

Meteorological history
- Formed: August 24, 1985
- Dissipated: September 2, 1985

Typhoon
- 10-minute sustained (JMA)
- Highest winds: 130 km/h (80 mph)
- Lowest pressure: 960 hPa (mbar); 28.35 inHg

Category 2-equivalent typhoon
- 1-minute sustained (SSHWS/JTWC)
- Highest winds: 175 km/h (110 mph)
- Lowest pressure: 961 hPa (mbar); 28.38 inHg

Overall effects
- Fatalities: 23
- Damage: $300 million (1985 USD)
- Areas affected: Japan
- IBTrACS
- Part of the 1985 Pacific typhoon season

Typhoon Pat, known in the Philippines as Typhoon Luming, was a powerful typhoon that struck Japan during the summer of 1985. Pat is also one of three storms in the Western Pacific which interacted with each other. Originating from a monsoon trough towards the end of August, Pat first formed on August 24 several hundred miles east of the Philippines. It gradually intensified, and two days later, Pat was upgraded into a tropical storm. The cyclone initially moved east-northeast while continuing to deepen. However, Pat leveled off in intensity on August 27. After turning northwest, Pat attained typhoon intensity on August 28. Pat accelerated towards the north, and reached its peak intensity of 80 mph (130 km/h) on August 30. The next day, the storm crossed the southern Japanese islands and entered the Sea of Japan. Gradually weakening, Pat transitioned into an extratropical cyclone later on August 31. Early the next day, the storm moved ashore along northeastern Japan. The system dissipated on September 2 after reentering the Pacific Ocean. A total of 23 perished due to Typhoon Pat and 12 others were rendered as missing. Additionally, 79 people were injured. Furthermore, 38 houses in Japan were demolished, 110 were damaged, and over 2,000 were flooded. More than 160,000 homes lost power. A total of 165 flights were cancelled.

== Meteorological history ==
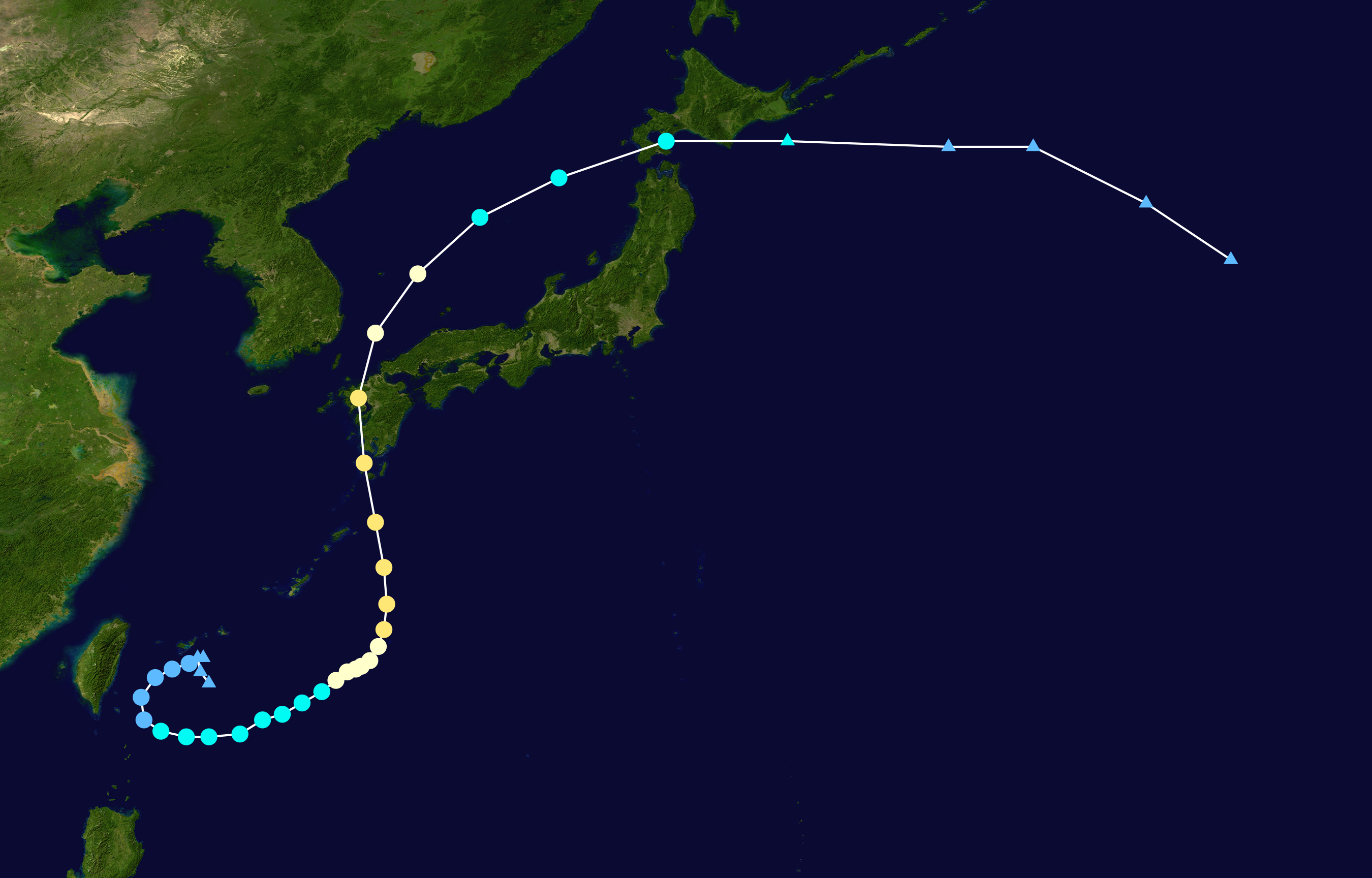
Map plotting the storm's track and intensity, according to the Saffir–Simpson scale Map key Saffir–Simpson scale Tropical depression (≤38 mph, ≤62 km/h) Tropical storm (39–73 mph, 63–118 km/h) Category 1 (74–95 mph, 119–153 km/h) Category 2 (96–110 mph, 154–177 km/h) Category 3 (111–129 mph, 178–208 km/h) Category 4 (130–156 mph, 209–251 km/h) Category 5 (≥157 mph, ≥252 km/h) Unknown Storm type Tropical cyclone Subtropical cyclone Extratropical cyclone, remnant low, tropical disturbance, or monsoon depression

Typhoon Pat originated from an active monsoon trough located east of the Philippines in the last two weeks of August. Forming around the time as Typhoon Odessa and Tropical Storm Ruby, an area of enhanced convection was first noted towards the end of August. At 0600 UTC on August 24, the Japan Meteorological Agency (JMA) started watching the system. Fifteen hours later, the Joint Typhoon Warning Center (JTWC) followed suit. At this time, the system was located within a favorable environment. The JTWC issued a Tropical Cyclone Formation Alert (TCFA) on the afternoon of August 25. Early the next day, the JMA upgraded the disturbance into Tropical Storm Pat. (Note: The Japan Meteorological Agency is the official Regional Specialized Meteorological Center for the western Pacific Ocean.) Later on August 26, a Hurricane Hunter aircraft reported winds of 70 km/h (45 mph) and a pressure of 999 mbar (29.5 inHg), but did not locate a surface circulation. That afternoon, the TCFA was re-issued. Following additional Hurricane Hunter reports, which noted evidence of a surface circulation, the JTWC declared the system Tropical Storm Pat.

Initially poorly organized, Pat headed east-northeast, south of a subtropical ridge. At 0600 UTC on August 27, the JMA increased the intensity of the storm to 95 km/h (60 mph). Meanwhile, the JTWC anticipated the storm to move east-northeast and separate from the monsoon trough before turning west-northwest under a weakening ridge. Instead, Pat drifted northeast, but remained situated within the monsoon trough. As such, the JTWC revised their forecast, and now expected the storm to move northwest due to the presence of an eastward moving trough situated over Mongolia. Meanwhile, the JMA increased the intensity of Pat to 105 km/h (65 mph) early on August 28. Several hours later, both the JTWC and the JMA upgraded Pat to a typhoon. (Note: Wind estimates from the JMA and most other basins throughout the world are sustained over 10 minutes, while estimates from the United States-based Joint Typhoon Warning Center are sustained over 1 minute. 10 minute winds are about 1.14 times the amount of 1 minute winds.) According to the JMA, the storm leveled off intensity for about a day. By midday on August 29, some tropical cyclone forecast models began to show Pat emerging into the Sea of Japan west of the ridge. However, this theory was not supported by the JTWC as they believed that the ridge was too narrow to be picked up a trough. That same day, the JTWC increased the intensity to 160 km/h (99 mph), equivalent to a Category 2 cyclone on the United States-based Saffir-Simpson Hurricane Wind Scale. The next day, the agency finally revised its forecast and predicted the storm to enter the sea. Around this time, the JTWC estimated that Pat attained peak intensity, with winds of 170 km/h (105 mph). During the evening of August 30, the JMA reported that Pat reached its peak intensity of 135 km/h (85 mph) and a pressure of 955 mbar (28.2 inHg). By this time, the ridge was gone, though a trough was now located near South Korea.

Shortly after its peak, Pat moved ashore along the southern tip Kyushu on August 31. Overland, Pat began to weaken, and early the next day, the JMA downgraded Pat to a severe tropical storm. Meanwhile, Pat began to interact with Odessa, as the systems were approximately 500 km (310 mi) apart. As Odessa moved east-northeast, Pat accelerated towards the north, and then emerged into the Sea of Japan later on August 31. That evening, the JTWC downgraded Pat into a tropical storm. At 2100 UTC that day, the JTWC noted that Pat had transitioned into an extratropical cyclone. By this time, all the convection activity was restricted to the northeast quadrant of the system. Early on September 1, Pat made landfall in Hokkaido along northeastern Japan. At that time, the JMA estimated winds of 110 km/h (70 mph). At midday, the JTWC stopped watching the system, although the JMA continued to do so until 1800 UTC on September 2.

== Preparations, impact and aftermath ==
While crossing Japan, a peak rainfall total of 374 mm (14.7 in) was recorded in Ebino, including 271 mm (10.7 in) in a day. A peak hourly storm total of 107 mm (4.2 in) was measured at Gokaharadake on Nagasaki. Pat was responsible for strong winds, including a 69 km/h (43 mph) wind speed in Yakushima. The island of Kyushu sustained the worst affects from the typhoon. Twenty-three people were killed by the typhoon while 12 others were listed as missing. A 61-year-old man who died when knocked over by a street sign in Izumi. A 35-year-old woman was crushed to death in Kagoshima when her home was demolished. A total of 179 people were injured due to Pat, including 23 on Honshu and 156 on Kyushu. In Aomori, a tent fell on 400 people attending a sporting event, injuring 18. In the nearby Yamagata prefecture, a signboard at a school ground fell due to strong winds, injuring four students. Nearby, in the Kumamoto prefecture, one man was struck and killed by a flying tin plate, another was swept out to sea, and a man died when a ladder fell on him. Elsewhere, twelve fisherman perished at sea, seven of whom were not confirmed dead until September 2.

A total of 38 houses in Japan were destroyed, 110 were damaged, and more than 2,000 were flooded. Landslides were observed at 56 locations. Power was lost to 160,000 families. A total of 165 flights were cancelled, delaying 15,000 passengers. A total of 160 trains were cancelled. Two bullet train lines experienced delays in Kyushu; ferry and air service were also delayed there. Offshore, ten fishing boats sunk, including one Japanese cargo ship. An additional 12 ships were rendered as missing. Ninety-five other boats took refuge in North Korea, though 59 left on September 2 to return to Japan. Damages totaled to ¥71.4 billion (US$300 million).

== See also ==
- Typhoon Bess (1982)
- Typhoon Forrest (1983)
- Typhoon Namtheun (2016)
