= List of storms named Lise =

The name Lise has been used for two tropical cyclones worldwide: one in the West Pacific Ocean and one in the South-West Indian Ocean.

In the West Pacific:

- Typhoon Lise (1949) – a Category 4 typhoon.

In the South-West Indian:

- Cyclone Lise (1971) – a tropical cyclone that originated as Cyclone Yvonne in the Australian region.

== See also ==
- Tropical Storm Lisette (1997) – a South-West Indian Ocean tropical cyclone with a similar name.
