= Tropical Storm Luke =

Pacific tropical storm in 1991

Severe Tropical Storm Luke (Pepang)
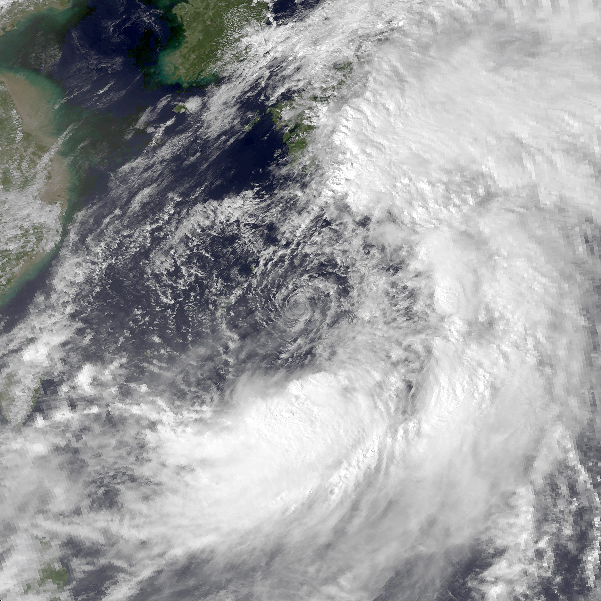
- Tropical Storm Luke early on September 18

Meteorological history
- Formed: September 14, 1991
- Dissipated: September 19, 1991

Severe tropical storm
- 10-minute sustained (JMA)
- Highest winds: 100 km/h (65 mph)
- Lowest pressure: 980 hPa (mbar); 28.94 inHg

Tropical storm
- 1-minute sustained (SSHWS/JTWC)
- Highest winds: 95 km/h (60 mph)
- Lowest pressure: 987 hPa (mbar); 29.15 inHg

Overall effects
- Fatalities: 12 total
- Damage: $179 million (1991 USD)
- Areas affected: Japan
- IBTrACS
- Part of the 1991 Pacific typhoon season

Severe Tropical Storm Luke, known in the Philippines as Tropical Storm Pepang, was a short-lived tropical storm that brushed Japan during September 1991. Tropical Storm Luke formed from a disturbance that moved through the Northern Marianas and became a tropical depression on September 14 just to the west of the islands. The depression began to slowly intensify as it moved towards the west-northwest and Tropical Storm Luke was named on September 15. Luke reached peak intensity prior to recurving to the northeast and weakening due to increased shear. Tropical Storm Luke then paralleled the southeastern Japan coastline before transitioning into an extratropical cyclone. Overall, 12 people were killed and 23 others were injured. A total of 225 houses were destroyed while 52,662 others were flooded. There were reports of 644 landslides and roads were damaged at 418 locations. Rivers crested at 18 spots and six bridges were washed away. Greater than 40 domestic flights were cancelled. A total of 103 bullet trains were cancelled and 160 others delayed between Tokyo and Osaka, which left 315,000 people stranded. Additionally, 11,999 trains were halted in eastern and northern Japan, stranding 750,000 passengers. Two ships as well as 4,973 ha (12,290 acres) of farmland were damaged. Monetary damage totaled ¥24.2 billion yen (US$179 million).

== Meteorological history ==
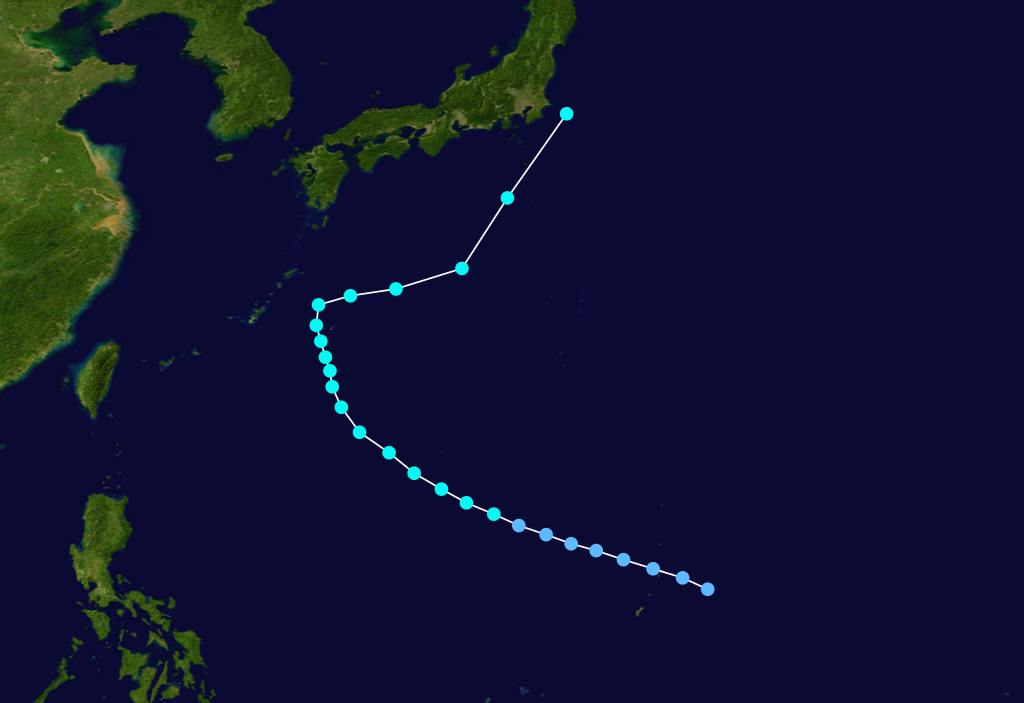
Map plotting the storm's track and intensity, according to the Saffir–Simpson scale Map key Saffir–Simpson scale Tropical depression (≤38 mph, ≤62 km/h) Tropical storm (39–73 mph, 63–118 km/h) Category 1 (74–95 mph, 119–153 km/h) Category 2 (96–110 mph, 154–177 km/h) Category 3 (111–129 mph, 178–208 km/h) Category 4 (130–156 mph, 209–251 km/h) Category 5 (≥157 mph, ≥252 km/h) Unknown Storm type Tropical cyclone Subtropical cyclone Extratropical cyclone, remnant low, tropical disturbance, or monsoon depression

An area of disturbed weather that would later become Tropical Storm Luke was first noted by the Joint Typhoon Warning Center (JTWC) early on September 13. The disturbance was upgraded into a tropical depression by the Japan Meteorological Agency (JMA) the following morning. (Note: The Japan Meteorological Agency is the official Regional Specialized Meteorological Center for the western Pacific Ocean.) As the disturbance tracked west-northwestward, passing near Saipan, improved upper-level anticyclonic outflow and falling surface pressures led to the issuance of a Tropical Cyclone Formation Alert at 11:30 UTC on September 14. At 18:00 UTC, the JTWC designated the system Tropical Depression 20W, based on synoptic data that indicated the disturbance developed a closed surface circulation. At the time of the upgrade, the depression's structure resembled that of a monsoon depression, with a ring of 55 km/h (35 mph) winds surrounding a large area of light and variable winds, indicating a broad and ill-defined circulation. Early on September 15, the JTWC upgraded the depression into Tropical Storm Luke, with the JMA following suit six hours later. (Note: Wind estimates from the JMA and most other basins throughout the world are sustained over 10 minutes, while estimates from the United States-based Joint Typhoon Warning Center are sustained over 1 minute. 10-minute winds are about 1.14 times the amount of 1-minute winds.)

The cyclone continued to slowly intensity over the next 48 hours as it tracked west-northwestward. On September 17, satellite imagery indicated that the circulation had become less defined and the overall system had lost organization. Despite this, the JTWC increased the intensity of the storm to 95 km/h (60 mph), its peak intensity. Meanwhile, the JMA upgraded Luke into a severe tropical storm. At 18:00 UTC, the JMA estimated that Luke reached its peak intensity of 105 km/h (65 mph). Luke turned north-northwestward, only to make a turn to the east as a midtropospheric trough caused the subtropical ridge, which had been holding the system to a westward track, to recede eastward. Meanwhile, the vertical wind shear caused by westerlies increased, causing Luke to transition into an extratropical cyclone. The JTWC issued its final warning at noon on September 19, with the JMA declaring Luke extratropical that evening. It was last noted late on September 21.

== Impact ==
Even though Luke did not attain typhoon intensity, its broad monsoonal structure resulted in large circumference of gale-force winds while torrential rains inundated large portions of western Japan. A peak rainfall total of 545 mm (21.5 in) occurred at Owase, including 528 mm (20.8 in) in a 24-hour time frame. A peak hourly rainfall total of 86 mm (3.4 in) was observed in Fuijsakatoge in Mie Prefecture. A wind gust of 119 km/h (74 mph) was recorded in Erimo.

In Wakayama Prefecture, the storm, in conjunction with a cold front, dropped heavy rains, which damaged 59 homes and roads in 94 locations. Seven people were displaced from their homes. Damage in the prefecture reached ¥1.1 billion. A house collapsed and buried a person alive in Atsugi. Two people died in Yokohama after a fence fell, where 52 houses were damaged. Thirty-one structures were damaged in Totsuka-ku. A total of 496 dwellings were damaged in Kawaski and 243 others were damaged in Sagamihara. Overall, three people were wounded and 1,451 people were left homeless in Kanagawa Prefecture. Landslides collapsed three dwellings in Tokyo. One person was killed in Shizuoka Prefecture and another was hurt. A total of 301 homes were damaged and an additional 107 were destroyed, resulting in 438 homeless. There were 99 landslides and roads were damaged in 131 locations. Two people were killed in Kumano. A landslide shattered a house in Mie Prefecture, burying an elderly couple who were subsequently rescued. A total of 1,032 homes were damaged and 147 homes were demolished across the prefecture. Seven construction workers were trapped in Chiba Prefecture after water flooded the tunnel they were working in. There, four people were wounded. A total of 1,595 homes were damaged and 336 others were destroyed. Damage was estimated at ¥1.31 billion. In Yamanashi Prefecture, two people were killed, with two others also injured. A total of 632 homes were damaged and 94 others were destroyed, which resulted in 2,321 homeless. A middle school student was found dead in Aichi Prefecture after being swept away via floodwaters. A total of 8,797 homes were destroyed and 4,618 were damaged. There, 121 landslides were also reported. One hundred-thirty-nine homes were damaged and two more were destroyed in Gifu Prefecture, which resulted in nine people homeless. Damage there amounted to ¥732 million. Two people sustained injuries in Ibaraki Prefecture. There, a total of 2,782 homes were damaged and 466 others were destroyed, resulting in almost 65,000 individuals displaced from their homes. Nearly 3,000 ha (7,400 acres) of farmland were damaged in Saitama Prefecture, totaling ¥1.96 billion. Fifteen homes sustained damage in Gunma prefecture while one hundred sixty-eight others were damaged in Tochigi Prefecture. One person died in Nagano Prefecture. A total of 146 homes were damaged and destroyed there. Damage amounted to ¥4.5 billion. A total of 657 dwellings were damaged and 75 other homes were demolished. Further north, thirty-two homes were damaged and nine were destroyed in Iwate Prefecture. Damage there was assessed at ¥2.02 billion.

Nationwide, 12 fatalities were reported and 23 others sustained injuries. A total of 225 houses were destroyed while 52,662 others were flooded. Over 20,000 dwellings were damaged. More than 40 domestic flights were cancelled. Twelve Toyota plants were closed due to the storm. Rivers crested at eighteen points and six bridges were washed away. A total of 103 bullet trains were cancelled and 160 others were delayed between Tokyo and Osaka, which disrupted travel plans of 315,000 people. In addition, 11,999 trains were halted in eastern and northern Japan, inconveniencing 750,000 passengers. By September 20, however, train service was restored to most of the impacted area. There were 644 landslides and roads were damaged at 418 points. Two ships along with 4,973 ha (12,290 acres) of farmland were damaged. Authorities estimated damage at ¥24.2 billion (US$79 million). (Note: All currencies are converted from Japanese yen to United States Dollars using this with an exchange rate of the year 1991.) (Note: All damage totals are in 1990 values of their respective currencies.)

== See also ==
- List of Western Pacific severe tropical storms
