= List of storms named Lewis =

The name Lewis has been used for two tropical cyclones in the West Pacific Ocean:

- Tropical Storm Lewis (1990) (T9002, 02W) – an early-season minimal tropical storm which affected no land areas.
- Severe Tropical Storm Lewis (1993) (T9303, 08W, Huling) – a severe tropical storm which peaked as a Category 2-equivalent typhoon and affected the Philippines and South China.
