= Tropical Storm Lucille =

Pacific tropical storm in 1960

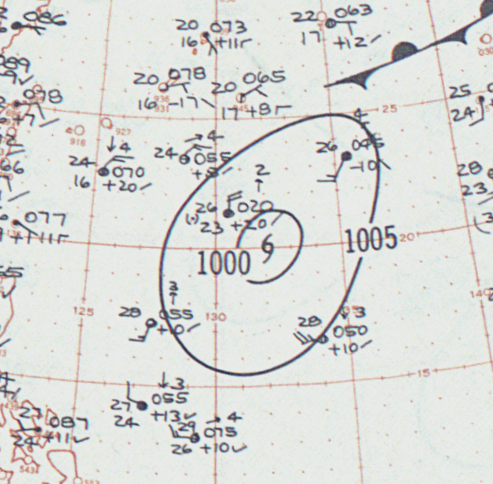
- Surface weather analysis of Lucille on May 30

Meteorological history
- Formed: May 25, 1960
- Extratropical: June 1
- Dissipated: June 4, 1960

Unknown-strength storm
- 10-minute sustained (JMA)
- Lowest pressure: 985 hPa (mbar); 29.09 inHg

Tropical storm
- 1-minute sustained (SSHWS/JTWC)
- Highest winds: 85 km/h (50 mph)

Overall effects
- Fatalities: 108 confirmed (300–500 estimated deaths)
- Missing: >150
- Damage: ≥$2 million (1960 USD)
- Areas affected: Philippines, Iwo Jima, Chichi-jima
- IBTrACS
- Part of the 1960 Pacific typhoon season

Tropical Storm Lucille was the first tropical cyclone to have its name retired in the Western Pacific basin. Lucille was identified as a weak tropical depression on May 25, 1960, to the east of the Philippines. Tracking northwestward, the system failed to develop and warnings on it were discontinued on May 27. At the same time, a second system began organizing along the west coast of Luzon. The two systems ultimately merged into one over the Philippines between May 28 and 29. Now tracking northeastward, the system re-intensified and became a tropical storm on May 30. Lucille attained its peak intensity later that day with winds of 85 km/h (53 mph). As it accelerated over open waters, the system brushed the islands of Iwo Jima and Chichi-jima before transitioning into an extratropical cyclone on June 1. The remnants of Lucille were last noted on June 4 near the International Date Line.

Between May 27 and 29, heavy rains fell across much of Luzon as Lucille developed. These rains, amounting to 406 mm (16 in) in the suburbs of Manila, triggered destructive floods that left some areas under 4.6 m (15 ft) of water. The worst of the floods took place during the overnight hours of May 28 to 29. During that time, hundreds of homes were swept away and an estimated 300–500 people, including at least 80 children, were killed. Monetary losses from the floods exceeded $2 million.

== Meteorological history ==
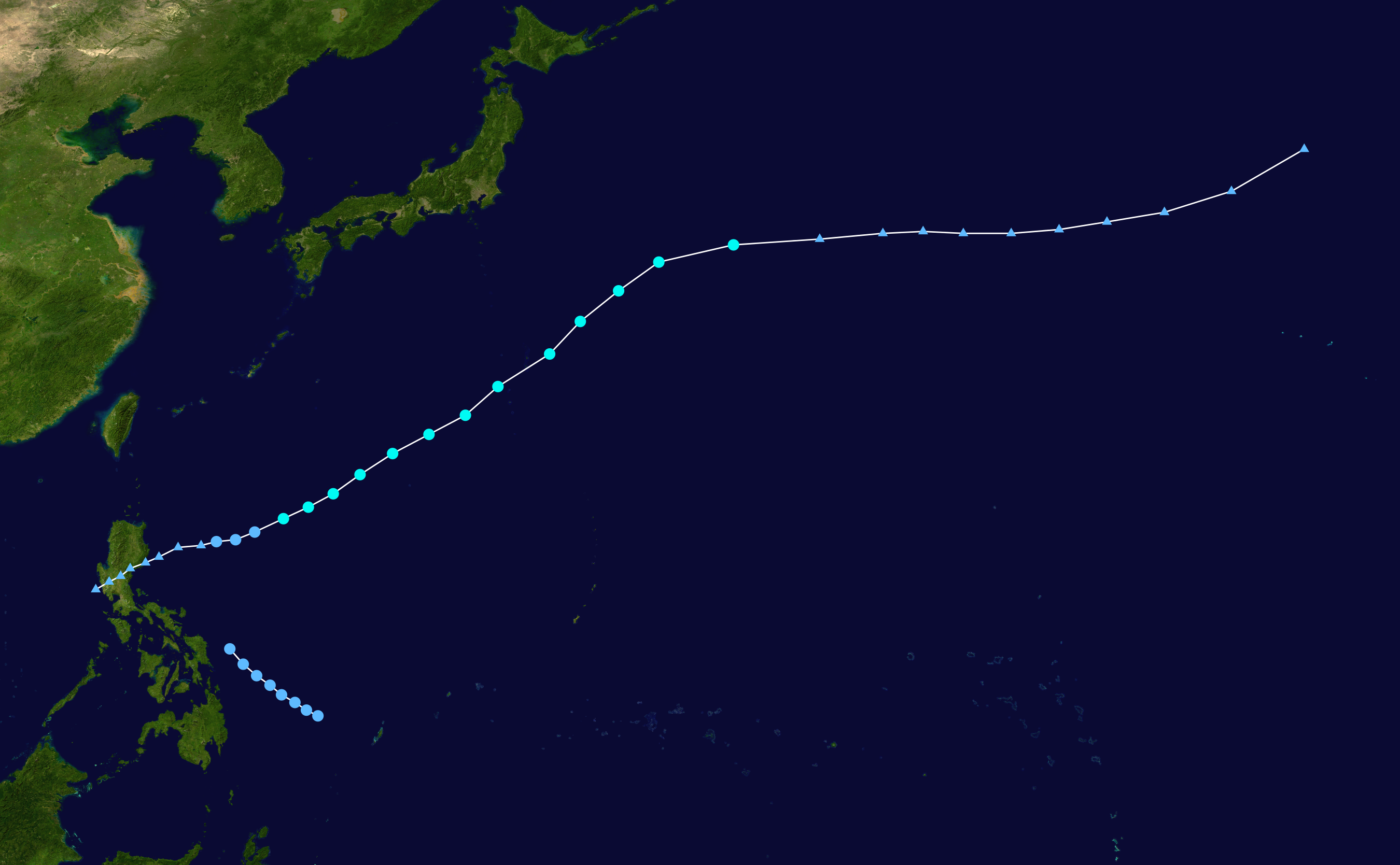
Map plotting the storm's track and intensity, according to the Saffir–Simpson scale Map key Saffir–Simpson scale Tropical depression (≤38 mph, ≤62 km/h) Tropical storm (39–73 mph, 63–118 km/h) Category 1 (74–95 mph, 119–153 km/h) Category 2 (96–110 mph, 154–177 km/h) Category 3 (111–129 mph, 178–208 km/h) Category 4 (130–156 mph, 209–251 km/h) Category 5 (≥157 mph, ≥252 km/h) Unknown Storm type Tropical cyclone Subtropical cyclone Extratropical cyclone, remnant low, tropical disturbance, or monsoon depression

On May 24, 1960, a possible area of low pressure was identified to the west of Koror in the Republic of Palau. Tracking generally to the northwest, the system gradually developed. Despite only having winds around 30 km/h (19 mph), it was classified as a tropical depression early the next day and assigned the name Lucille by the Joint Typhoon Warning Center (JTWC). Around the same time, a second, less organized low pressure system developed off the west coast of Luzon, Philippines. That system remained almost stationary over the South China Sea as Lucille accelerated northwestward. Early on May 27, the JTWC issued their final advisory on the depression as it approached the Philippines. After degenerating, the remnants of Lucille moved over the Visayas.

Shortly after the JTWC issued their final advisory on Lucille, the Japan Meteorological Agency (JMA) began monitoring the system near Luzon as a tropical depression. By May 28, radiosonde data from Clark Air Base in Luzon indicated that the second system acquired a closed circulation at the 500 mb level and began moving northeastward. (Note: At standard sea-pressure, the 500 mb level is equal to 5.5 km (3.4 mi) above sea-level.) While crossing the northern Philippines, the two systems merged and became a single cyclone, retaining the name Lucille. During its passage of the country, winds up to 63 km/h (39 mph) were reported in Manila. Once back over open waters, the system intensified as it accelerated northeastward, attaining tropical storm intensity early on May 30.

Tropical Storm Lucille attained its peak intensity late on May 30 with winds of 85 km/h (53 mph) and an estimated barometric pressure of 985 mbar (hPa; 29.09 inHg). At this time, the China Meteorological Administration assessed Lucille to have been a stronger system, attaining typhoon status with two-minute sustained winds estimated at 125 km/h (78 mph). Around 1700 UTC on May 31, the storm tracked approximately 65 km (40 mi) west of Iwo Jima. Roughly five hours later, it moved within 15 km (9.3 mi) of Chichi-jima where a pressure of 992 mbar (992 hPa; 29.3 inHg) was measured. Sustained winds on Chichi-jima reached 95 km/h (59 mph); however, these were determined to be unrepresentative of Lucille's actual intensity due to natural funneling on the island. On June 1, the system transitioned into an extratropical cyclone as it turned west-northwestward and continued over open waters. The remnants of Lucille were last noted by the JMA on June 4 as it crossed the International Date Line.

== Impact ==
Prior to transitioning into an extratropical cyclone, Lucille brushed the Japanese islands of Iwo Jima and Chichi-jima. On the former, winds reached 55 km/h (34 mph) while on the latter, gusts peaked at 130 km/h (81 mph). The gusts on Chichi-jima caused the USS Cayuga County to broach in the harbor.

Due to the significant loss of life caused by the storm, the name Lucille was retired. This marked the first time that a tropical cyclone in the Western Pacific had its name removed following its usage. For unknown reasons it was not replaced with any particular name, making it one of two storms in the basin to not have a replacement, although Lucy took the name's place in 1962.

=== Philippines ===
Across the northern Philippines, torrential rains associated with Lucille, the secondary low, and a subsequent southwesterly monsoon caused extensive flooding. The heaviest rains took place between May 27 and 28, with conditions similar to a tropical storm occurring during the overnight hours. During a 24-hour span on May 27, 218 mm (8.6 in) of rain fell in Manila. In surrounding areas, more than 406 mm (16 in) of rain fell. Gale-force winds toppled trees and billboards and brought down telephone lines. The city of Manila was brought to a virtual standstill as three quarters of the city became submerged in at least 0.3 m (1 ft) of water. Transportation was shut down and businesses were deserted the day after the floods. Taking place mainly in the suburban communities surrounding Manila, rivers over-topped their banks and inundated "squatter" areas. The hardest-hit areas were submerged in up to 4.6 m (15 ft) of water. Residents reported that homes were swept off their foundations by the water and were brought downstream. Others reported seeing bodies floating amid debris. In Tondo, floodwaters reaching 1.8 m (6 ft) deep killed at least seven people. Hundreds of homes were swept away in Manila, resulting in many deaths. Numerous homes were washed away in Quezon City. The heart of Manila was spared flooding as the river running through the city began to recede after nearly over-topping the concrete dike surrounding it.

Throughout the Philippines, officials confirmed that 108 people, including 80 children, had been killed and a further 150 were missing by May 30. Later reports on the storm stated that approximately 300 people lost their lives. Some news reports indicated that as many as 500 people may have been killed. Additionally, more than 20,000 people were left homeless. Losses amounted to roughly $2 million. The floods were regarded as the nation's worst since 1947. The flooding caused by Lucille was also considered the worst ever in the country by some until September 2009 when Typhoon Ketsana devastated Manila.

In the immediate aftermath of the floods, the entire Manila police force was mobilized to assist residents and begin relief operations. On May 29, Quezon City mayor Norberto S. Amoranto sent an emergency request to the Philippine Air Force to rescue people trapped on rooftops.

== See also ==
- List of retired Pacific typhoon names (JMA)
- 1960 Pacific typhoon season
- Typhoon Ketsana
- Typhoon Rita (1972)
