= Typhoon Dinah (1987) =

Pacific typhoon in 1987

Typhoon Dinah (Luding)
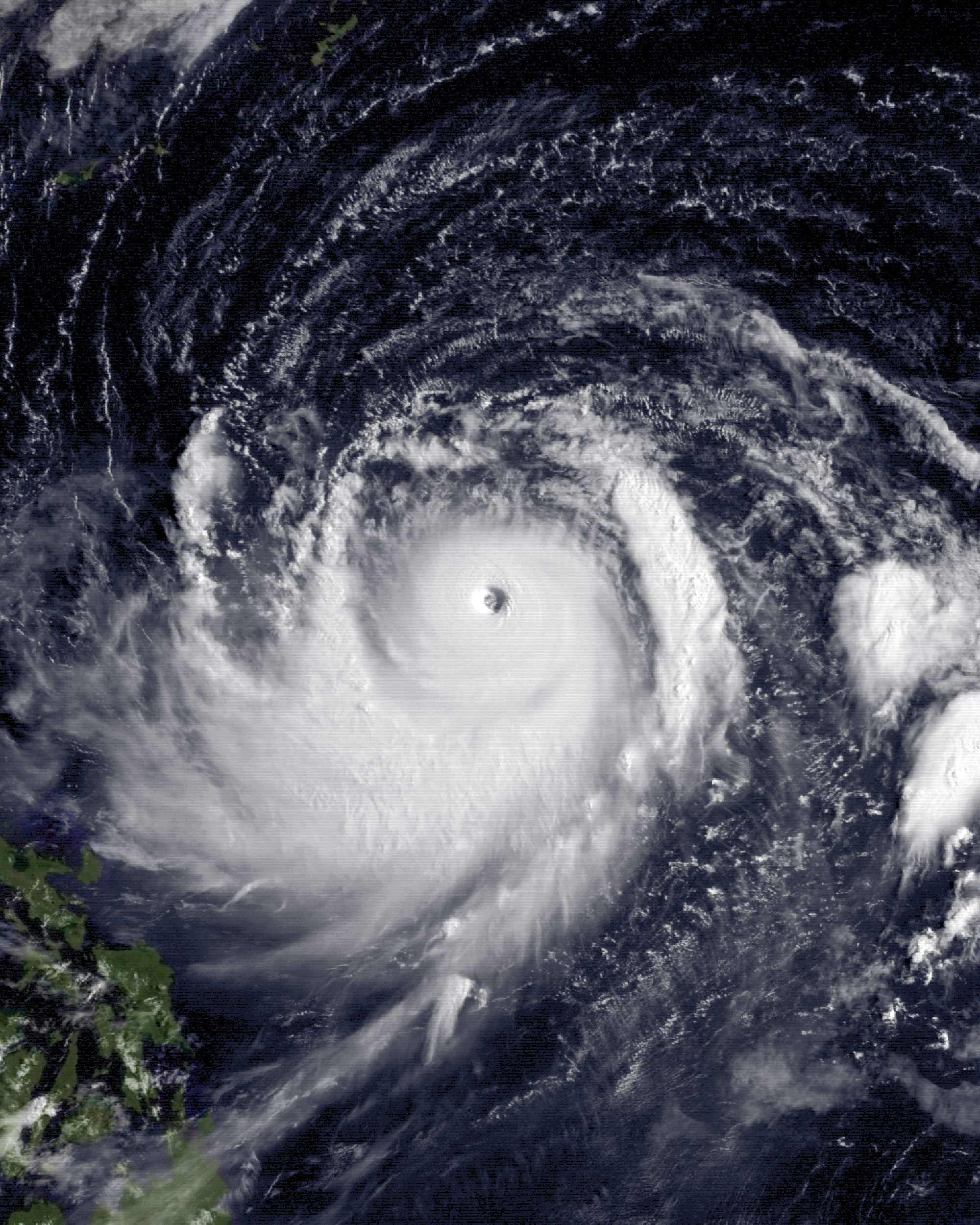
- Typhoon Dinah at peak intensity on August 26

Meteorological history
- Formed: August 19, 1987
- Extratropical: August 31, 1987
- Dissipated: September 3, 1987

Very strong typhoon
- 10-minute sustained (JMA)
- Highest winds: 185 km/h (115 mph)
- Lowest pressure: 915 hPa (mbar); 27.02 inHg

Category 4-equivalent super typhoon
- 1-minute sustained (SSHWS/JTWC)
- Highest winds: 240 km/h (150 mph)
- Lowest pressure: 910 hPa (mbar); 26.87 inHg

Overall effects
- Fatalities: 40
- Missing: 52
- Damage: $643 million (1987 USD)
- Areas affected: South Korea, Okinawa, Japan, Soviet Union
- IBTrACS
- Part of the 1987 Pacific typhoon season

Typhoon Dinah, known as Super Typhoon Luding in the Philippines, was the costliest tropical cyclone to form in the 1987 Pacific typhoon season. It also was the fourth typhoon to form during August 1987. An area of low pressure developed near Guam on August 19, and two days later, the low reached tropical storm intensity as it moved generally west. Intensification was initially gradual, with Dinah becoming a typhoon early on August 24, before it subsequently intensified at a faster pace. Dinah reached its highest strength on August 26 before turning northward on August 28 and into a less favorable conditions aloft, which prompted weakening. Dinah entered the Sea of Japan after passing near Okinawa on August 29, where Dinah leveled off in intensity. The system then began to recurve towards southwestern Japan, and after tracking through the area, Dinah transitioned into an extratropical cyclone on August 31, although the remnants could be traced for four more days as it approached the International Date Line.

Across Okinawa, one person was killed, and six more were injured; eight homes were destroyed or seriously damaged, and 13 boats sunk or were damaged. Damage exceeded $1.3 million (1987 USD). On the island of Kyushu, 250 homes were flooded and about 450,000 homeowners lost power. Throughout Japan, eight people perished, damage totaled $604 million and 89 were wounded. The typhoon destroyed nearly 40,000 dwellings and an additional 600 were flooded. In South Korea, 4,372 structures were destroyed, leaving more than 11,000 people homeless. Nationwide, the typhoon was responsible for flooding 80,000 ha (197,685 acres) of crops. Property damage was estimated at $39.1 million.

== Meteorological history ==
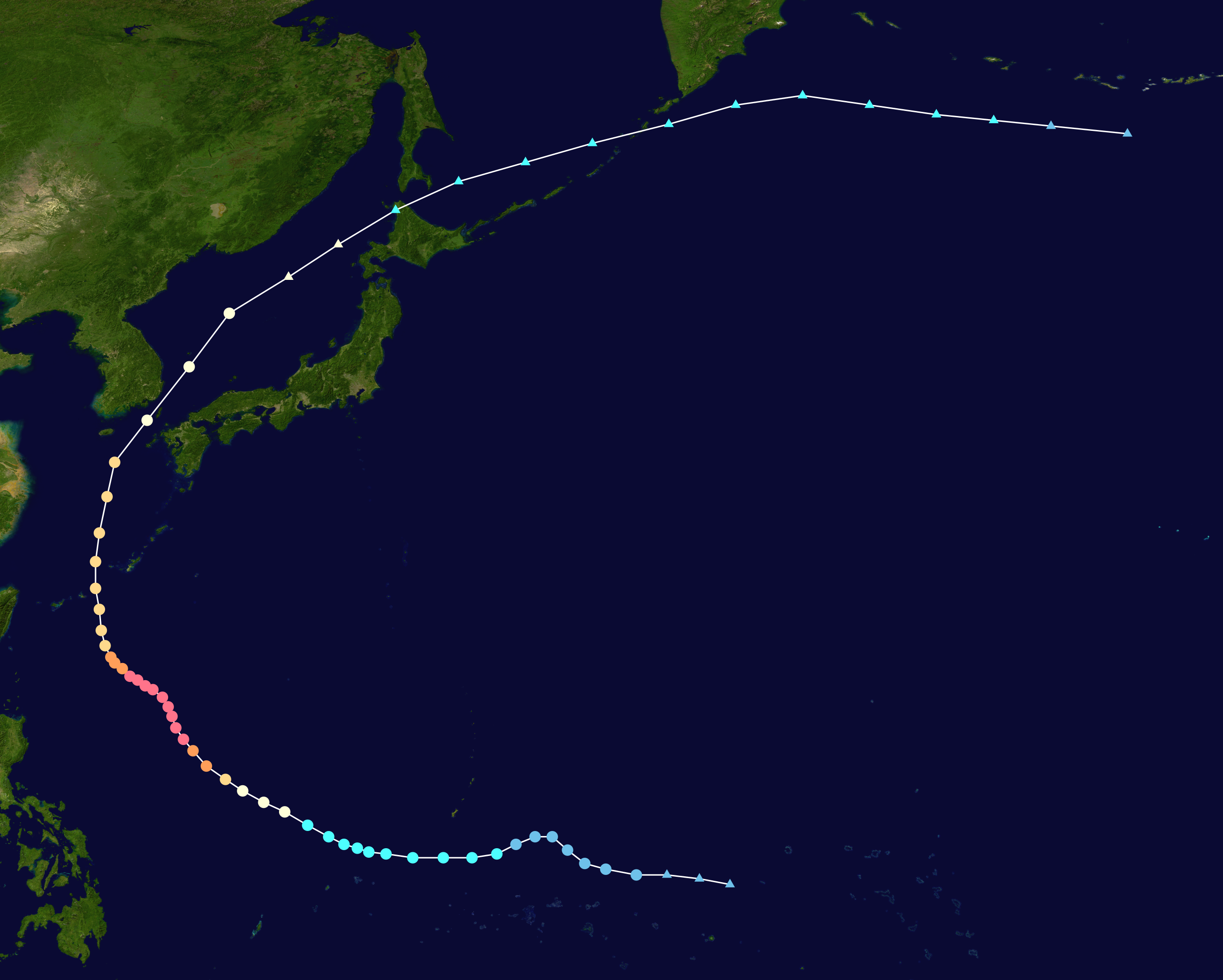
Map plotting the storm's track and intensity, according to the Saffir–Simpson scale Map key Saffir–Simpson scale Tropical depression (≤38 mph, ≤62 km/h) Tropical storm (39–73 mph, 63–118 km/h) Category 1 (74–95 mph, 119–153 km/h) Category 2 (96–110 mph, 154–177 km/h) Category 3 (111–129 mph, 178–208 km/h) Category 4 (130–156 mph, 209–251 km/h) Category 5 (≥157 mph, ≥252 km/h) Unknown Storm type Tropical cyclone Subtropical cyclone Extratropical cyclone, remnant low, tropical disturbance, or monsoon depression

The origins of Typhoon Dinah can be traced back to a poorly organized area of disturbed weather that formed on August 18 close to Guam and was embedded in the monsoon trough, at the time situated near the equator. At 06:00 UTC on August 19, the Joint Typhoon Warning Center (JTWC) started tracking the system, as the system started to show signs of organization. Shortly thereafter, a low pressure area developed along the axis of the system, prompting the JTWC to issue a Tropical Cyclone Formation Alert and the Japan Meteorological Agency (JMA) to start keeping an eye on the low. (Note: The Japan Meteorological Agency is the official Regional Specialized Meteorological Center for the western Pacific Ocean.) Late on August 20, there was a rapid increase in the coverage of the thunderstorm activity, and satellite intensity estimates via the Dvorak Technique reached T2.0/55 km/h (35 mph). Based on this, the JTWC upgraded the system into a tropical depression at 00:00 UTC on August 21.

Shortly after the upgrade, the depression began to turn west in response to a subtropical high to its north. The system then moved beneath an upper-level high, resulting in improved outflow and decreased wind shear. Following an increase in Dvorak classifications, the JTWC classified the depression as Tropical Storm Dinah on the evening of August 21. Early the following day, the JMA also upped the cyclone into a tropical storm. (Note: Wind estimates from the JMA and most other basins throughout the world are sustained over 10 minutes, while estimates from the United States-based Joint Typhoon Warning Center are sustained over 1 minute. 10-minute winds are about 1.14 times the amount of 1-minute winds.) However, strong wind shear prevented intensification at the climatological rate of one T number per day, as the storm passed roughly 225 km (140 mi) south of Guam. Midday on August 23, the JMA declared Dinah a severe tropical storm. Shortly after the upgrade, Dinah began to enter an area of lower shear, which accelerated intensification. After turning west-northwest and an increase in the storm's Dvorak intensity estimates, both the JTWC and JMA upgraded Dinah into a typhoon on the morning of August 24. At the time of the upgrade, Dinah was located about 925 km (575 mi) west of Guam. Despite a brief increase in shear, Dinah began to rapidly intensify over the ensuing 24 hours. At 06:00 UTC on August 25, the JTWC increased the intensity of the typhoon to 185 km/h (115 mph), equal to Category 3 status on the United States-based Saffir–Simpson hurricane wind scale. Early on August 26, the JTWC estimated that Dinah, while continuing northwest at a steady clip, obtained maximum sustained wind speed, with 240 km/h (150 mph), making it a super typhoon. Even though data from the JTWC suggested that Dinah began to weaken almost immediately thereafter, the JMA estimated that Dinah reached its maximum sustained wind speed and minimum barometric pressure of 185 km/h (115 mph) and 915 mbar (27.0 inHg), respectively, at noon on August 26. Around this time, the Philippine Atmospheric, Geophysical and Astronomical Services Administration (PAGASA) also monitored the storm and assigned it with the local name Luding.

Typhoon Dinah's forward speed then began to slow as the storm approached a weakness in the ridge. Midday on August 28, Dinah began to turn north as it rounded the high. This change in the storm's direction led to the storm encountering stronger wind shear from a series of shortwave troughs that passed north of the storm, which redistricted the typhoon's outflow. This shear resulted in weakening, though the JTWC estimated the typhoon still had winds of 100 mph (160 km/h) as the storm passed approximately 175 km (110 mi) west of Kadena Air Base on the afternoon of August 29. Dinah then leveled off in intensity as the storm entered the Sea of Japan, and on August 30, Dinah began to recurve to the north-northeast. That day, the typhoon passed 100 km (60 mi) northwest of Sasebo Naval Base in western Japan while transitioning into an extratropical cyclone. By 00:00 UTC on August 31, Dinah began to merge with a frontal zone near the polar jet stream. Several hours later, the JTWC stopped monitoring the system as it completed its extratropical transition, but the JMA continuing to track the extratropical remnants of Dinah until September 3, when it crossed the International Date Line.

== Preparations and impact ==
The storm lashed Okinawa Prefecture with strong winds of 117 km/h (73 mph), and gusts of 196 km/h (122 mph). The lowest sea level pressure observed on the island was 983 mbar (29.0 inHg), although offshore, a ship measured a pressure of 938.7 mbar (27.72 inHg). The capital of Okinawa, Naha, recorded 245 mm (9.6 in) of rain, including 236 mm (9.3 in) during one day; both of these totals were the highest reported across Japan. All ferry and airline service to Japan from Naha was halted. Throughout the capital of Okinawa, 13 fishing boats were damaged and three houses were destroyed. Throughout Okinawa, six people were injured, including one who required brief hospitalization from cuts as a result of flying glass. Police reported that eight houses were seriously damaged or destroyed. One person was killed and damage exceeded $1.3 million. Offshore, a 150,000 kg (150 t) ferry also sank, and a 2,730 t (3,010 short tons) vessel and another ferry went aground. In all, Dinah was considered the worst tropical cyclone to affect Okinawa in 20 years.

Along Kyushu, 250 homes were flooded and about 450,000 homeowners lost power. Off the coast of Kyushu, a 7,567 t (7,567,000 kg) vessel went aground and 41 boats were sunk. Throughout southwestern Japan, storm surge resulted in extensive damage to seawalls and piers. A landing craft from the USS San Bernardino was destroyed when the seawall eroded and the pier collapsed. Damage to United States military bases in the archipelago totaled $6.7 million. Nationwide, 37,0768 homes were destroyed, with 611 others flooded. A total of 78 ha (195 acres) of crops was flooded and 79 ships were damaged due to Dinah. Eight people perished, and 89 others were hurt. Damage in Japan amounted to $604 million. (Note: All currencies are converted from Japanese yen to United States Dollars using this with an exchange rate of the year 1987.)

Although Typhoon Dinah did not directly strike South Korea, the storm inundated much of the country, which was already affected by Typhoon Thelma six weeks earlier. In the South Chongchong Province, a peak rainfall total of 300 mm (11.8 in) was measured. The storm forced closure of 2,312 schools. Six people were killed when a small Buddhist temple collapsed due to heavy rains near Taegu, located 240 km (150 mi) southeast of Seoul, the officials said Offshore, a 99,000 kg (99 t) fishing boat sunk near Ulleungdo Island, located approximately 320 km (200 mi) east of Seoul, and left 32 fishermen missing, though one crewman was successfully rescued. Nationwide, 33 people were killed, 52 were unaccounted for, a total of 432 structures received flooded, and 4,372 buildings were destroyed, resulting in over 11,000 people homeless. Overall, the typhoon deluged 80,000 ha (197,685 acres) of crops. Property damage was assessed at $39.1 million.

== See also ==
- Typhoon Hal (1985)
- Typhoon Hinnamnor (2022) – had a similar track to Dinah
