= List of Category 1 Australian region tropical cyclones =

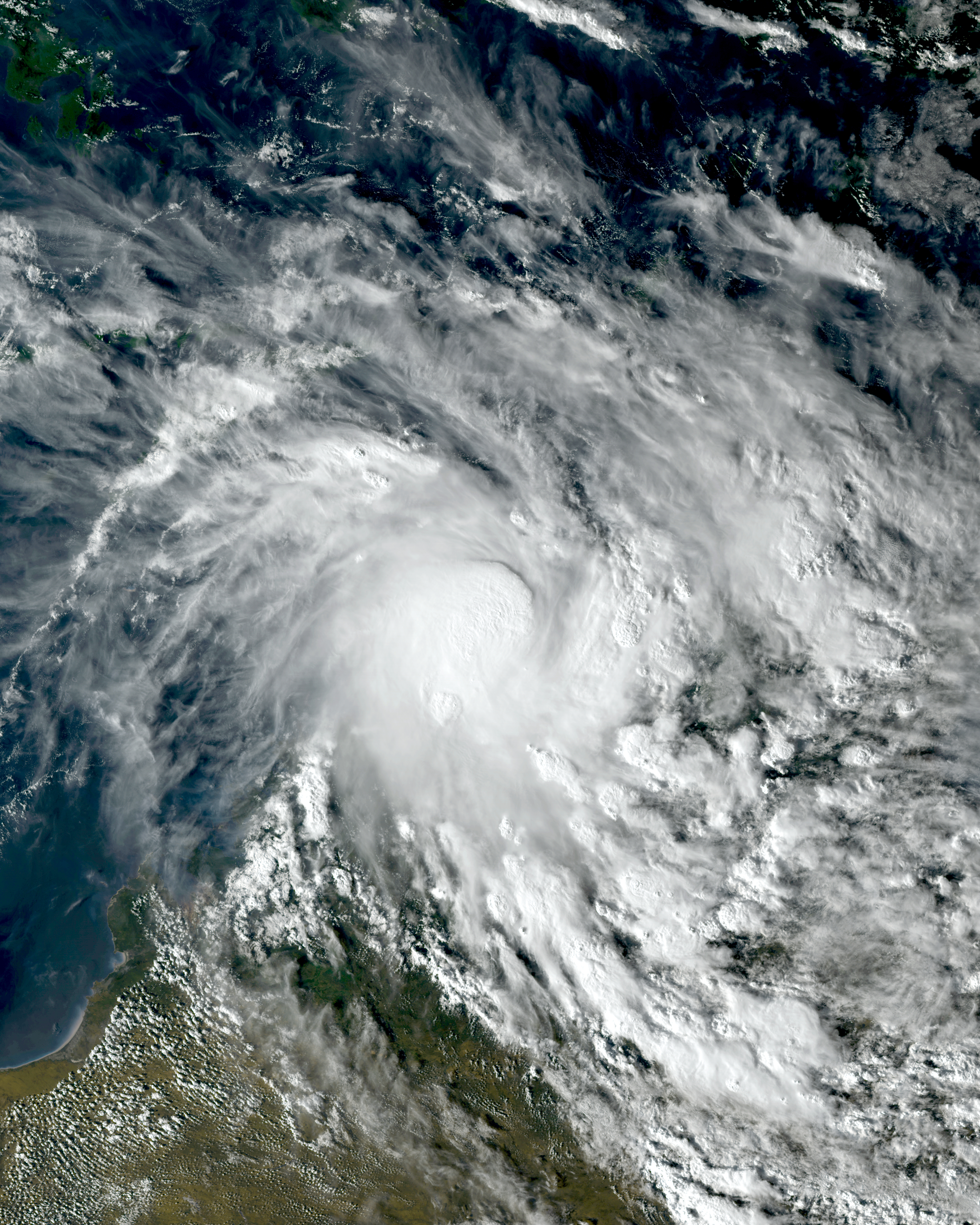
Cyclone Ellie

Category 1 is the lowest classification on the Australian tropical cyclone intensity scale used to classify tropical cyclones, that have 10-minute sustained winds of 33–47 knots (61–87 km/h; 38–54 mph). As of 2020 tropical cyclones have peaked as Category 1 tropical cyclones in the South Pacific tropical cyclone basin, which is denoted as the waters surrounding Australia to the south of the equator, between 90°E and 160°E. The earliest tropical cyclone to be classified as a Category 1 tropical cyclone was Carmen. The latest was Ellie which was classified as a Category 1 tropical cyclone as it affected Australia.

== Background ==
The Australian region tropical cyclone basin is located to the south of the Equator between 90°E and 160°E. The basin is officially monitored by the Australian Bureau of Meteorology, Papua New Guinea's National Weather Service as well as Indonesia's Badan Meteorologi Klimatologi dan Geofisika. Other meteorological services such as the Fiji Meteorological Service, the New Zealand MetService, Météo-France as well as the United States Joint Typhoon Warning Center also monitor the basin. Within the basin a Category 1 tropical cyclone is a tropical cyclone that has 10-minute mean maximum sustained wind speeds of 33–47 knots (61–87 km/h; 38–54 mph) on the Australian tropical cyclone intensity scale. A named storm could also be classified as a Category 1 tropical cyclone if it is estimated, to have 1-minute mean maximum sustained wind speeds of between 64–82 knots (119–152 km/h; 74–94 mph) on the Saffir–Simpson hurricane wind scale. However, this scale is not officially used in the Australian, however, various agencies including NASA also use it to compare tropical cyclones. A Category 1 tropical cyclone is expected to cause some damage, if it significantly impacts land at or near its peak intensity.

== Systems ==
=== 1970s ===
Name	Duration	Peak intensity		Areas affected	Damage (USD)	Deaths	Refs
Name	Duration	Wind speed	Pressure	Areas affected	Damage (USD)	Deaths	Refs
Isa	16–18 April 1970	75 km/h (45 mph)	990 hPa (29.23 inHg)	Solomon Islands			
Dora	10–17 February 1971	75 km/h (45 mph)	990 hPa (29.23 inHg)	Queensland	Widespread	None	
Fiona	24 February 1971	75 km/h (45 mph)	990 hPa (29.23 inHg)	Queensland, New Caledonia			
Faith	14–22 April 1972	75 km/h (45 mph)	990 hPa (29.23 inHg)	Northern Territory, Queensland			
Maud	29–31 January 1973	85 km/h (50 mph)	990 hPa (29.23 inHg)	Western Australia			
Bella	23–24 March 1973	75 km/h (45 mph)	998 hPa (29.47 inHg)	Northern Territory			
Paula	29–24 March 1973	75 km/h (45 mph)	998 hPa (29.47 inHg)	Northern Territory			
Natalie	1 December 1973	75 km/h (45 mph)	998 hPa (29.47 inHg)				
Flora	13–14 March 1975	85 km/h (50 mph)	990 hPa (29.23 inHg)	Northern Territory			
Amelia (1975)	6–9 April 1975	75 km/h (45 mph)	990 hPa (29.23 inHg)	Northern Territory			
Denise	20–23 May 1975	75 km/h (45 mph)	992 hPa (29.29 inHg)	Cocos Island	Minor	None	
Kim (1975)
Sue (1975)
Alan (1976)
Hope (1976)
Carol (1976)
June (1977)
Keith (1977)
Lily (1977)
Miles (1977)
Nancy (1977)
Otto (1977)
Stan (1979)
Gordon (1979)

=== 1980s ===
Name	Duration	Peak intensity		Areas affected	Damage (USD)	Deaths	Refs
Name	Duration	Wind speed	Pressure	Areas affected	Damage (USD)	Deaths	Refs
Paul
27P (1980)
Edna	20 - 27 December 1980	75 km/h (45 mph)	994 hPa (29.35 inHg)	None	None	None	
Amelia	4 - 7 December 1981	65 km/h (40 mph)	996 hPa (29.41 inHg)	Northern Territory	Unknown	Unknown	
04U	19 - 27 December 1981	85 km/h (50 mph)	990 hPa (29.23 inHg)	Northern Territory	Unknown	Unknown	
Coral
Claudia
Des
Fritz
06U
Rebecca	20 - 23 February 1985	75 km/h (45 mph)	994 hPa (29.35 inHg)	Arnhem Land, Cape York Peninsula	Minimal	Unknown	
Ophelia
Hector
Vernon
Alfred
Blanch(e)
Herbie	18–19 May 1988	75 km/h (45 mph)	980 hPa (28.94 inHg)	Western Australia	$20 million	None	
John	23 – 31 January 1989	75 km/h (45 mph)	990 hPa (29.23 inHg)	Cocos Island	None	None	
Leon – Hanitra	13 – 19 February 1989	85 km/h (50 mph)	988 hPa (29.18 inHg)	None	None	None	
Marcia	2 – 5 March 1989	65 km/h (40 mph)	995 hPa (29.38 inHg)	None	None	None	
Ernie	9 – 13 May 1989	85 km/h (50 mph)	998 hPa (29.47 inHg)	Vanuatu, Solomon Islands, Papua New Guinea	Unknown	Unknown	

=== 1990s ===
Name	Duration	Peak intensity		Areas affected	Damage (USD)	Deaths	Refs
Name	Duration	Wind speed	Pressure	Areas affected	Damage (USD)	Deaths	Refs
Rosita	4 – 17 January 1990	85 km/h (50 mph)	988 hPa (29.18 inHg)	None	None	None	
Greg	28 February – 5 March 1990	75 km/h (45 mph)	990 hPa (29.23 inHg)	None	None	None	
Bessi	15 – 18 April 1990	85 km/h (50 mph)	990 hPa (29.23 inHg)	None	None	None	
Laurence	8 – 12 December 1990	65 km/h (40 mph)	992 hPa (29.29 inHg)	None	None	None	
Ken	17 – 21 December 1992	75 km/h (45 mph)	990 hPa (29.23 inHg)	Cocos Island	None	None	
Oscar	28 December 1993 – 9 January 1994	65 km/h (40 mph)	995 hPa (29.38 inHg)	Northern Territory, Western Australia	None	None	
Sadie	29 – 31 January 1994	85 km/h (50 mph)	990 hPa (29.23 inHg)	Cape York	None	None	
Tim	28 March – 3 April 1994	65 km/h (40 mph)	995 hPa (29.38 inHg)	Christmas Island, Cocos Island	None	None	
Emma	2 – 16 December 1995	75 km/h (45 mph)	990 hPa (29.23 inHg)	Christmas Island	Minor	None	
Isobel	27 January – 1 February 1996	65 km/h (40 mph)	995 hPa (29.38 inHg)	None	None	None	
Dennis	15 – 18 February 1996	75 km/h (45 mph)	990 hPa (29.23 inHg)	Cape York	None	None	
Lindsay	9 – 13 July 1996	75 km/h (45 mph)	990 hPa (29.23 inHg)	None	None	None	
Melanie – Bellamine	28 October – 1 November 1996	85 km/h (50 mph)	985 hPa (29.09 inHg)	None	None	None	
Nicholas	12 – 15 December 1996	85 km/h (50 mph)	985 hPa (29.09 inHg)	Western Australia	None	None	
Gillian	8 – 12 February 1997	85 km/h (50 mph)	995 hPa (29.38 inHg)	Papua New Guinea, Queensland	Unknown	Unknown	
Ita	23 – 24 February 1997	85 km/h (50 mph)	994 hPa (29.35 inHg)	Queensland	Unknown	Unknown	
Sid	24 – 29 December 1997	85 km/h (50 mph)	985 hPa (29.09 inHg)	Northern Territory	$100 million	1	
May	25 – 26 February 1998	75 km/h (45 mph)	990 hPa (29.23 inHg)	Northern Territory	Unknown	Unknown	
Zelia	7 – 10 October 1998	75 km/h (45 mph)	990 hPa (29.23 inHg)	None	None	None	
Olinda	20 – 21 January 1999	85 km/h (50 mph)	990 hPa (29.23 inHg)	New Caledonia	Unknown	Unknown	

=== 2000s ===
Name	Duration	Peak intensity		Areas affected	Damage (USD)	Deaths	Refs
Name	Duration	Wind speed	Pressure	Areas affected	Damage (USD)	Deaths	Refs
Marcia	14 – 18 February 2000	65 km/h (40 mph)	995 hPa (29.38 inHg)	None	None	None	
Winsome	8 – 14 February 2001	75 km/h (45 mph)	981 hPa (28.97 inHg)	Northern Territory	AU$1 million	1	
Wylva	15 – 22 February 2001	75 km/h (45 mph)	988 hPa (29.18 inHg)	Northern Australia	AU$13 million	Unknown	
Errol	8 – 14 May 2002	75 km/h (45 mph)	995 hPa (29.38 inHg)	None	None	None	
Upia	21 – 29 May 2002	65 km/h (40 mph)	995 hPa (29.38 inHg)	Budelun Island	Unknown	Unknown	
Beni	1 – 5 February 2003	65 km/h (40 mph)	995 hPa (29.38 inHg)	Queensland, Solomon Islands; Vanuatu, New Caledonia	$6 million	1	
Graham	27 February – 1 March 2003	75 km/h (45 mph)	985 hPa (29.09 inHg)	Western Australia	Unknown	1	
Harriet	1 – 11 March 2003	85 km/h (50 mph)	985 hPa (29.09 inHg)	None	None	None	
Epi	5 – 6 June 2003	65 km/h (40 mph)	993 hPa (29.32 inHg)	Papua New Guinea	Unknown	Unknown	
Evan	27 February – 4 March 2004	65 km/h (40 mph)	991 hPa (29.26 inHg)	Northern Australia	Unknown	Unknown	
Phoebe	1 – 5 September 2004	85 km/h (50 mph)	990 hPa (29.23 inHg)	None	None	None	
Raymond	30 December 2004 – 10 January 2005	85 km/h (50 mph)	985 hPa (29.09 inHg)	Western Australia, Northern Territory	None	None	
Tim	22 – 25 January 2005	85 km/h (50 mph)	990 hPa (29.23 inHg)	None	None	None	
Vivienne	4 – 9 February 2005	65 km/h (40 mph)	990 hPa (29.23 inHg)	None	None	None	
Emma	26 February – 1 March 2006	75 km/h (45 mph)	988 hPa (29.18 inHg)	Western Australia	Unknown	Unknown	
Pierre	15 – 23 May 2007	75 km/h (45 mph)	990 hPa (29.23 inHg)	Solomon Islands, Papua New Guinea	Unknown	Unknown	
01U/01S	26 July – 1 August 2007	75 km/h (45 mph)	992 hPa (29.29 inHg)	None	None	None	
Charlotte	10 – 12 January 2009	85 km/h (50 mph)	986 hPa (29.12 inHg)	Cape York Peninsular	Unknown	Unknown	
Ellie	10 – 12 January 2009	75 km/h (45 mph)	990 hPa (29.23 inHg)	Queensland	Unknown	Unknown	
Freddy	3 – 13 February 2009	85 km/h (50 mph)	992 hPa (29.29 inHg)	None	Unknown	Unknown	
Kirrily	18 April – 1 May 2009	75 km/h (45 mph)	998 hPa (29.47 inHg)	Indonesia	Unknown	Unknown	

=== 2010s ===
Name	Duration	Peak intensity		Areas affected	Damage (USD)	Deaths	Refs
Name	Duration	Wind speed	Pressure	Areas affected	Damage (USD)	Deaths	Refs
Neville	14 – 22 January 2010	65 km/h (40 mph)	995 hPa (29.38 inHg)	Queensland	Unknown	Unknown	
Tasha	23 — 25 December 2010	75 km/h (45 mph)	993 hPa (29.32 inHg)	Queensland	Unknown	1	
Vince	9 — 16 January 2011	75 km/h (45 mph)	986 hPa (29.12 inHg)	None	None	None	
25U/20S	29 March – 6 April 2011	75 km/h (45 mph)	994 hPa (29.35 inHg)	Western Australia	None	None	
21U/21P	27 June – 1 July 2012	85 km/h (50 mph)	994 hPa (29.35 inHg)	Papua New Guinea	Unknown	None	
Mitchell	26 December – 1 January	85 km/h (50 mph)	988 hPa (29.18 inHg)	None	None	None	
Oswald	17 – 29 January 2013	65 km/h (40 mph)	991 hPa (29.26 inHg)	Eastern Australia	$2.28 billion	6	
Alessia	20 November – 1 December 2013	75 km/h (45 mph)	993 hPa (29.32 inHg)	Northern Australia	Minimal	None	
Edna	31 January – 4 February	75 km/h (45 mph)	994 hPa (29.35 inHg)	Queensland, New Caledonia	Unknown	None	
Hadi	28 February – 12 March 2014	75 km/h (45 mph)	992 hPa (29.29 inHg)	Queensland, Papua New Guinea, Solomon Islands, Vanuatu	Unknown	None	
Raquel	30 June – 5 July 2015	65 km/h (40 mph)	996 hPa (29.41 inHg)	Solomon Islands	Minimal	1	
Yvette	18 – 25 December 2016	85 km/h (50 mph)	987 hPa (29.15 inHg)	Western Australia	Minimial	None	
Caleb	21 – 30 March 2017	85 km/h (50 mph)	994 hPa (29.35 inHg)	None	None	None	
Greg	29 April – 1 May 2017	65 km/h (40 mph)	995 hPa (29.38 inHg)	None	None	None	
Cempaka	21 – 29 November 2017	65 km/h (40 mph)	998 hPa (29.47 inHg)	Indonesia	Unknown	41	
Irving	3 – 6 January 2018	75 km/h (45 mph)	994 hPa (29.35 inHg)	None	None	None	
Flamboyan	27 – 28 April 2018	65 km/h (40 mph)	1002 hPa (29.59 inHg)	None	None	None	
Kenanga	14 - 16 December 2018	75 km/h (45 mph)	995 hPa (29.38 inHg)	None	None	None	
Lili	4 - 11 May 2019	75 km/h (45 mph)	997 hPa (29.44 inHg)	Eastern Indonesia, East Timor, Top End	Unknown	Unknown	

=== 2020s ===
Name	Duration	Peak intensity		Areas affected	Damage (USD)	Deaths	Refs
Name	Duration	Wind speed	Pressure	Areas affected	Damage (USD)	Deaths	Refs
Blake	4 - 8 January 2020	75 km/h (45 mph)	986 hPa (29.12 inHg)	Western Australia			
Esther	21 February - 4 March 2020	75 km/h (45 mph)	988 hPa (29.18 inHg)	Northern Australia	None	None	
Gretel	13 - 14 March 2020	75 km/h (45 mph)	990 hPa (29.23 inHg)	Cape York Peninsula, New Caledonia, New Zealand	Unknown	Unknown	
Harold	1 - 3 April 2020	65 km/h (40 mph)	997 hPa (29.44 inHg)	Solomon Islands, Vanuatu, Fiji, Tonga	Significant	29	
Joshua	13 - 17 January 2021	75 km/h (45 mph)	992 hPa (29.29 inHg)	None	None	None	
Kimi	15 - 19 January 2021	85 km/h (50 mph)	990 hPa (29.23 inHg)	Queensland	None	None	
Paddy	18 - 25 November 2021	75 km/h (45 mph)	995 hPa (29.38 inHg)	Christmas Island	None	None	
Teratai	30 November - 11 December 2021	75 km/h (45 mph)	996 hPa (29.41 inHg)	None	None	None	
01U	26 July - 1 August 2022	85 km/h (50 mph)	994 hPa (29.35 inHg)	None	None	None	
Ellie	21 December 2022 - 8 January 2023	75 km/h (45 mph)	990 hPa (29.23 inHg)	Northern Territory, Western Australia	Unknown	Unknown	

== Other systems ==
- Tropical Cyclone Pearl (1983) was declassified as a tropical cyclone during post-season analysis, after the BoM determined that it was unlikely to have become a tropical cyclone as a result of the strong wind shear over the area.
- Tropical Cyclones Isobel (2006), Odette (2008), Fletcher (2014) were declassified as tropical cyclones during post-season analysis, after the BoM determined that the system had not reached tropical cyclone intensity.
- Tropical Cyclone's Ken (2004) Gabrielle (2009), Anggrek (2010), Fina (2011) were all declassified as tropical cyclones during post-season analysis, after the BoM estimated that gale force winds did not extend more than 1/2 way around the centre.
- Tropical Cyclone Peta was declassified as a Category 1 tropical cyclone during post-season analysis after the BoM estimated that gale force winds did not extend more than 1/2 way around the centre for more than 6 hours.
- Tropical Cyclone Mangga was declassified as a Category 1 tropical cyclone during post-season analysis.
- The FMS shows that Tropical Cyclone Liua moved into the basin on September 28, 2018, as a Category 1 tropical cyclone with 10-minute sustained windspeeds of 65 km/h (40 mph).
- Metservice shows that Tropical Cyclone Veli was a Category 1 tropical cyclone within the Australian region between 4 - 6 February 1987, with 10-minute sustained winds of 85 km/h (50 mph).
- Tropical Cyclone Usha was named as a tropical cyclone by the Papua New Guinea National Weather Service, however, it is not currently recorded in the Australian Bureau of Meteorology's tropical cyclone database.

== Climatology ==
Category 1 tropical cyclones by month
Month	Number of storms
January	0
February	1
March	1
April	0
May	0
June	0
July	0
August	0
September	0
October	0
November	0
December	0

Category 1 tropical cyclones by decade
Decade	Number of storms
1970s	0
1980s	0
1990s	18
2000s	21
2010s	19
2020s	11

== See also ==
- List of Category 1 Atlantic hurricanes
- List of Category 1 Pacific hurricanes
