= Hurricane Lili (1996) =

Category 3 Atlantic hurricane in 1996

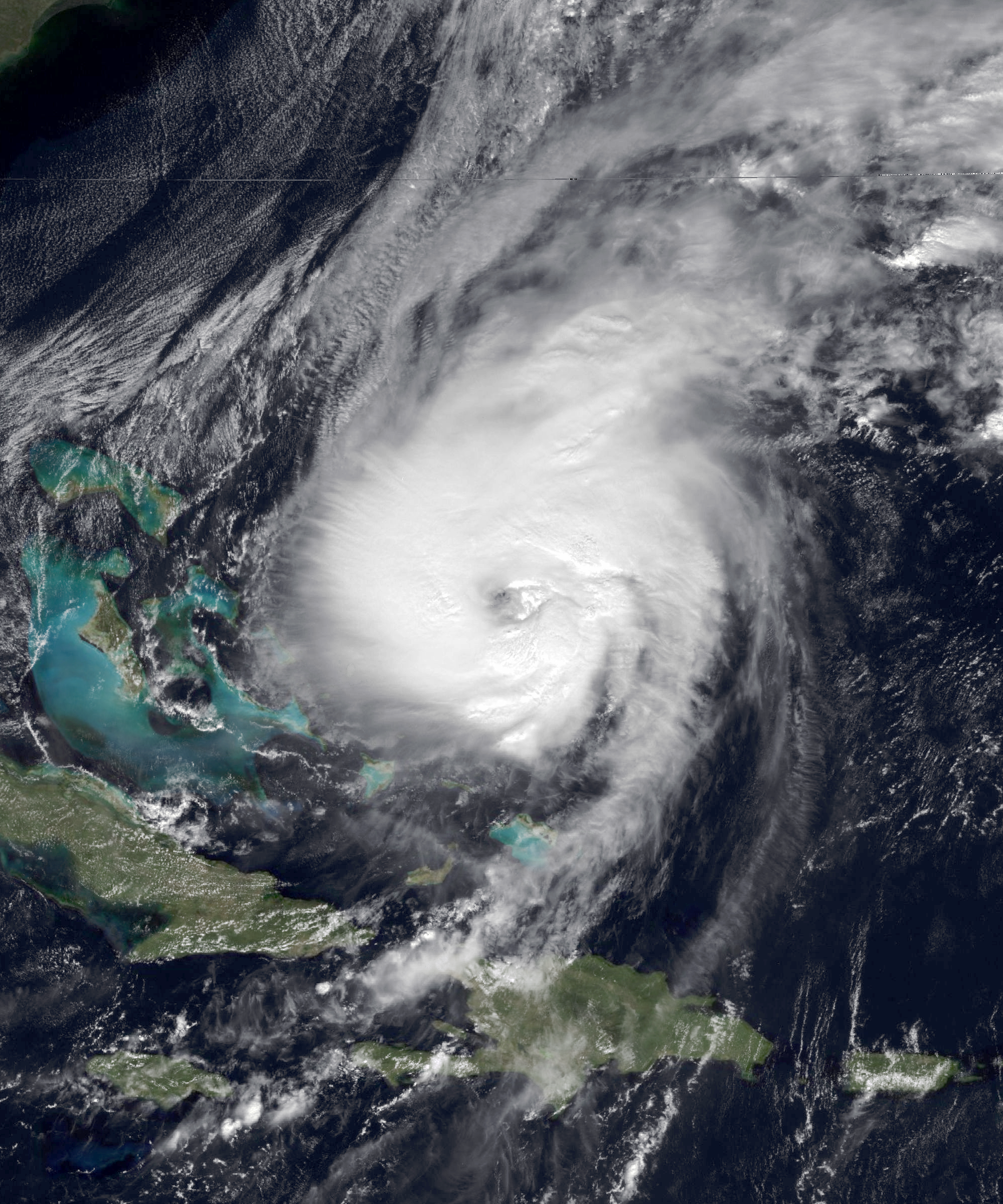
- Hurricane Lili at peak intensity east of the Bahamas on October 19

Meteorological history
- Formed: October 14, 1996
- Extratropical: October 27, 1996
- Dissipated: October 30, 1996

Category 3 major hurricane
- 1-minute sustained (SSHWS/NWS)
- Highest winds: 115 mph (185 km/h)
- Lowest pressure: 960 mbar (hPa); 28.35 inHg

Overall effects
- Fatalities: 22 total
- Damage: $662 million (1996 USD)
- Areas affected: Central America, Cuba, Florida, Bahamas, Bermuda, Ireland, Great Britain, Netherlands, Germany, Poland, Czech Republic, Austria, Slovakia, Hungary, Romania, Moldova, Ukraine, Kaliningrad Oblast, Lithuania, Belarus
- IBTrACS
- Part of the 1996 Atlantic hurricane season

Hurricane Lili was a relatively long-lived hurricane of the 1996 Atlantic hurricane season that affected countries from Central America to the United Kingdom. Lili formed on October 14 from a tropical wave, which emerged from the coast of west Africa on October 4. After the storm formed, further strengthening of Lili was gradual, first to tropical storm status on October 16 and then to hurricane status on October 17. The next day, Lili struck Cuba and moved across the central portion of the island, the first hurricane to hit the country since Hurricane Kate in 1985. After emerging into the Atlantic Ocean, the hurricane accelerated northeastward, briefly peaking as a category 3 hurricane on the Saffir-Simpson Hurricane Scale near the Bahamas. For almost an entire week, Hurricane Lili oscillated in intensity while fluctuating several times in forward speed. About two weeks passed before Lili transitioned into an extratropical storm north of the Azores on October 27, which subsequently moved across Ireland and Great Britain.

Early in its duration, Lili caused flooding in Central America that left thousands homeless and killed 14 people. Damage was heaviest in Cuba, mostly due to the hurricane's heavy rainfall which totaled 29.41 in (747 mm). The hurricane affected 11 Cuban provinces, damaging 92,542 houses and destroying another 6,369. The rains heavily damaged the sugar cane and banana crops, and overall damage in the country was estimated at $362 million (1996 USD). After 269,995 people were evacuated in advance of Lili, there were no deaths in the country. In nearby Florida, one person died after being swept into a drain during the storm's heavy rains. Moisture from Lili also fueled a storm that struck the northeastern United States, which contributed indirectly to a death when a man in Maine tried driving across a flooded roadway. Damage in the Bahamas was not severe, limited to some damaged roofs and downed trees. When the remnants of Lili struck Ireland and the United Kingdom, it produced strong winds and high seas that damaged hundreds of houses, causing $300 million in damage (1996 USD) and six deaths.

== Meteorological history ==
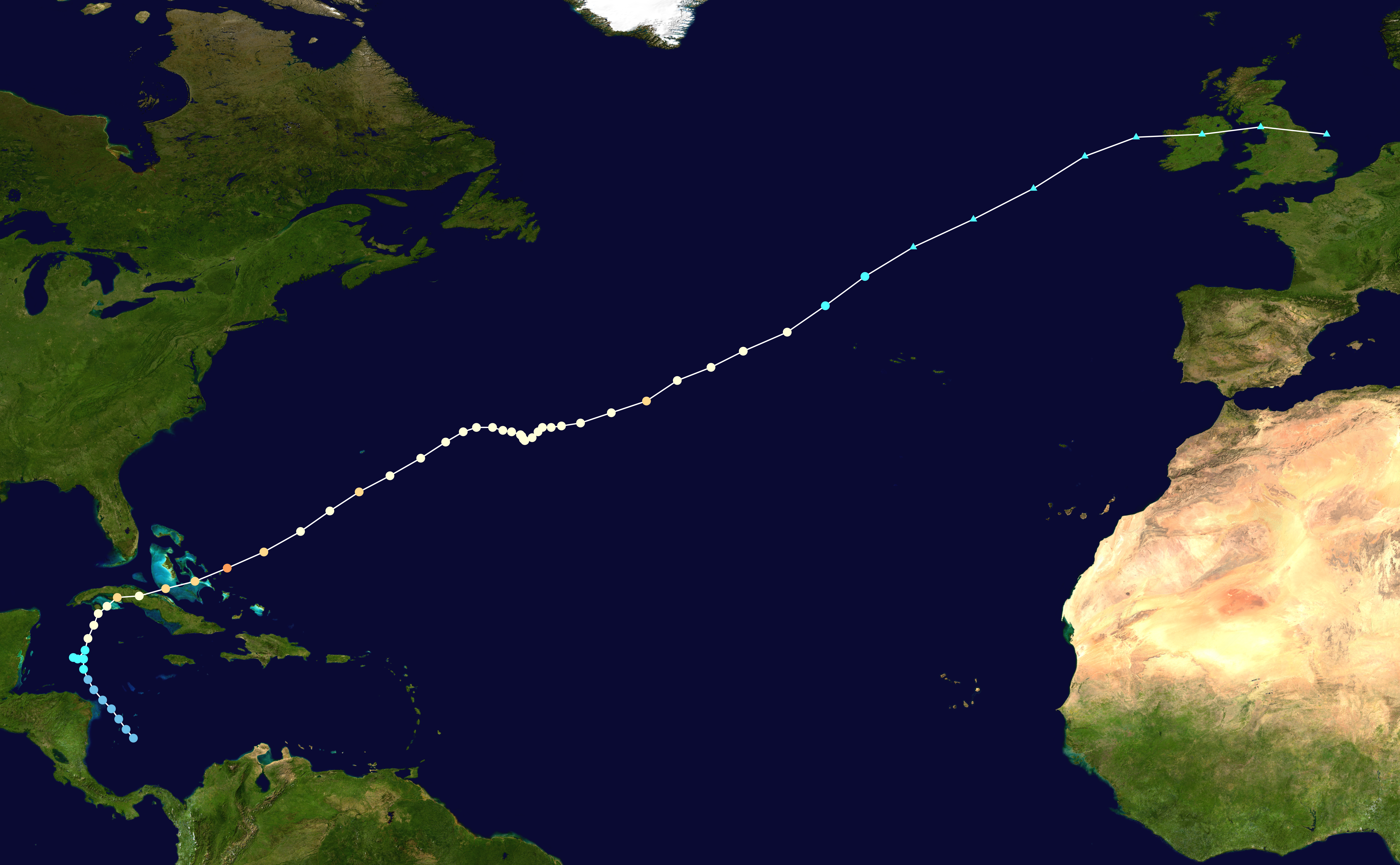
Map plotting the storm's track and intensity, according to the Saffir–Simpson scale Map key Saffir–Simpson scale Tropical depression (≤38 mph, ≤62 km/h) Tropical storm (39–73 mph, 63–118 km/h) Category 1 (74–95 mph, 119–153 km/h) Category 2 (96–110 mph, 154–177 km/h) Category 3 (111–129 mph, 178–208 km/h) Category 4 (130–156 mph, 209–251 km/h) Category 5 (≥157 mph, ≥252 km/h) Unknown Storm type Tropical cyclone Subtropical cyclone Extratropical cyclone, remnant low, tropical disturbance, or monsoon depression

On October 4, a tropical wave exited the west coast of Africa with a large associated circulation. Unfavorable wind shear prevented any development, and the wave continued westward, entering the Caribbean Sea on October 11. Two days later, the wave axis encountered a pre-existing low pressure area in the southwest Caribbean. It quickly developed a well-defined circulation, becoming a tropical depression on October 14 off the east coast of Nicaragua. Due to an upper-level low in the Gulf of Mexico, the system tracked to the northwest, brushing Central America in its path. The depression developed banding features as the pressure gradually dropped, and intensified into Tropical Storm Lili at around 0600 UTC on October 16. During this time, the storm executed a small cyclonic loop while a few hundred miles north of the Swan Islands. By early on October 17, Lili had attained hurricane status while it was turning to the north.

Hurricane Lili grazed Isla de la Juventud on October 18, bringing heavy rains and strong winds to the island. Later that day, Lili made landfall in Matanzas Province, Cuba as a category 2 hurricane, with winds close to 100 mph (160 km/h). Despite the mountainous terrain, the storm did not weaken, with the same pressure reading of 975 mbar (28.8 inHg) being observed at landfall and when Lili reemerged into the Atlantic Ocean. After reaching warm waters, Lili further strengthened as it approached the Bahamas. The eye of the storm – reaching a width of over 35 mi (56 km) – passed over San Salvador Island and Great Exuma on October 19, and brushed several other islands. That day, a trough in the westerlies caused Lili to accelerate northeastward, reaching a forward speed of almost 29 mph (47 km/h). On October 19 at 1200 UTC, Hurricane Lili attained its peak intensity for a brief time, reaching 115 mph (185 km/h) winds and pressure of 960 mbar (28 inHg), both measured by the Hurricane Hunters. This made Lili the sixth major hurricane – a category 3 on the Saffir-Simpson Hurricane Scale – of the season.

Within six hours, Lili had weakened below its peak intensity on October 19. The center passed 150 mi (240 km) to the southeast of Bermuda, and subsequently the winds gradually decreased. A mid-level ridge caused Lili to slow to an east-southeast drift on October 22. After two days, the hurricane again accelerated to the northeast, briefly re-intensifying into a category 2 hurricane. Lili again started a weakening trend soon after, and by October 26, was downgraded to a tropical storm about 345 mi (555 km) northwest of the Azores. On October 27, it was estimated that Lili became extratropical, which maintained gale-force winds as it approached Europe. The remnants moved across Ireland and Great Britain on October 28 with winds of about 65 mph (105 km/h). The remnants of Lili were absorbed by a much larger extratropical system in the North Sea on October 29, which proceeded to cross over the European mainland.

== Preparations and impact ==
Lili killed 22 people throughout its lifetime. Fourteen deaths were reported in Central America, and six in the United Kingdom. There were two deaths indirectly related to the hurricane in the United States. Damage figures for Central America and the Bahamas are unavailable, but total damages in Cuba and the British Isles were estimated at $662 million (1996 USD).

=== Western Caribbean ===
In its formative stages, Lili produced heavy rainfall in portions of Central America, causing flooding that left thousands of people homeless. In Costa Rica, there were four deaths, and five people drowned in Nicaragua, all due to river flooding. In Honduras, there were five deaths, one of which when a house was washed away.

The storm briefly posed a threat to Mexico, and a tropical storm warning was issued from Chetumal Bay to Cabo Catoche along the eastern Yucatán Peninsula. A tropical storm warning and hurricane watch were also issued for the Cayman Islands.

=== Cuba ===
Hurricane Lili over Cuba on October 18

While Lili was still a tropical depression, the government of Cuba issued a hurricane watch for Isla de la Juventud and the provinces of Pinar del Rio and Havana provinces. On October 16, a tropical storm warning was put in place for several provinces, which was upgraded to a hurricane warning the next day for eight provinces, eastward to Camagüey. The threat of the storm caused all flights to and from Cuba to be canceled, and the airport at Havana was closed. Officials set up shelters and ordered about 88,000 people in Havana to evacuate from buildings prone to collapsing; however, only 5,000 people had evacuated by the day before landfall, due to fears of their houses being robbed. Ultimately, 269,995 people evacuated due to the storm, along with over 270,000 livestock. Officials also closed classes and sent workers home in areas along the projected path, and two hospitals were completely evacuated. Power lines in Havana were intentionally turned off before the storm to minimize potential damage. Before Lili, the last hurricane to strike Cuba was Hurricane Kate in 1985. The country was already experiencing economic difficulties when the storm struck, following the collapse of the Soviet Union in a crisis known as the Special Period.

Crossing through Cuba, Hurricane Lili produced strong winds, affecting 11 of the country's 15 provinces. The offshore Cayo Largo del Sur reported 92 mph (148 km/h) in 10 minute sustained winds, with gusts to 120 mph (190 km/h). On the Isla de la Juventud, wind gusts reached 80 mph (130 km/h), and on the mainland, Santo Domingo reported wind gusts of 112 mph (180 km/h). Heavy rainfall accompanied the hurricane's passage through the country, peaking at 29.41 in (747 mm), including a daily total of 17.07 in (433 mm). High waves struck the southern coast of Cuba, estimated at over 20 ft (7 m).

While crossing Cuba, Lili primarily caused damage from its heavy rainfall and not from the winds. Nationwide, Lili damaged 92,542 houses and destroyed another 6,369, mostly in Cienfuegos and Sancti Spíritus, which left thousands of people homeless. Heavy rains caused homes to collapse along the path, many already in poor condition. On Isla de la Juventud, the winds damaged 85 houses and destroyed another 103. The winds also stripped 16 tons of grapefruit from their trees on the island. Nationwide, hundreds of thousands of trees fell during the storm. On Cayo Largo del Sur, the strong waves wrecked seaside cabanas. In Villa Clara Province, about 45 mi (75 km) of roads were damaged, and the winds destroyed the roofs of 28 sugar refineries. In Havana, the storm wrecked a dozen buildings and downed several trees. Nationwide, the hurricane downed hundreds of power lines, leaving many towns without power, and power plants were damaged in Sancti Spíritus and Cienfuegos provinces. The hurricane also damaged 21 hospitals and dozens of health clinics, along with 32 schools. Extensive crop damage occurred along the storm's path, affecting thousands of hectares of arable land, and damaging 105 agricultural facilities. Flooding affected the banana, fruit, coffee, sugar cane, and rice crops. Nationwide, the storm damaged about 25,406 hectares of bananas and 686,893 hectares of sugar cane, along with 36,249 hectares of other crops. In Sancti Espíritu, 28,000 tons of rice were wrecked, and in Matanzas, 7,500 tons of citrus crops were heavily damaged. Total damages in the country were estimated at $362 million (1996 USD). There were no deaths in Cuba, and seven injuries.

=== United States ===
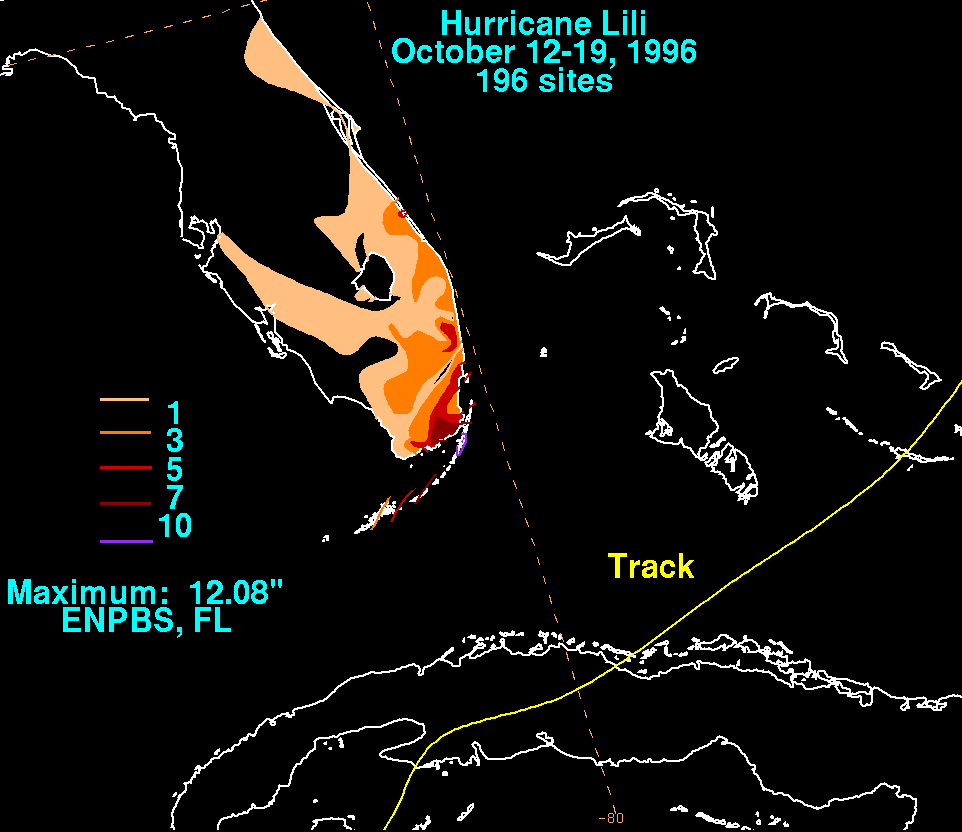
Lili's rainfall in Florida

Tropical cyclone forecast models correctly anticipated that Lili would pass southeast of Florida, despite a potential landfall within 24 hours had the storm maintained its previous track. The National Hurricane Center issued a tropical storm warning for the Florida Keys but not for the Miami metropolitan area. Wind gusts in the Florida Keys reached 38 mph (61 km/h) at Sand Key Light. For several days, a trough extended northward from the hurricane, producing heavy rainfall in the southeast portion of the state. The highest total was 12.08 in (307 mm) in Everglades National Park. One person died in Palm Beach County when a farm worker was swept into a canal drainage pipe.

High waves from the hurricane affected the northern coast of Puerto Rico, causing minor flooding.

On October 18, a low pressure area developed near Norfolk, Virginia, which moved up the coastline and struck New England the next day. The system drew moisture from Lili, which dropped heavy rainfall over portions of the northeastern United States that reached 13.03 in (331 mm) in Newburyport, Massachusetts. In the state, the rains flooded hundreds of houses, leaving over $10 million in damage. High rainfall and a storm surge flooded coastal portions of Maine, and Portland lost freshwater access for 24 hours after a water main broke. There was one indirect death when a man tried driving across a flooded road in Cumberland County, and damage in the state totaled over $26 million. Heavy rainfall in New Hampshire also caused flooding, and river flooding occurred in both Pennsylvania and New Jersey due to the storm. Farther south in Delaware, the rains caused flash flooding in northern New Castle County, and roadway flooding occurred in eastern Maryland.

=== Bahamas ===
A hurricane watch was issued for the northwestern Bahamas on October 17, which was upgraded to a warning and expanded to cover the central Bahamas on the next day. A tropical storm warning was later issued for the southeastern Bahamas and the Turks and Caicos Islands. The airport in Nassau was closed before the storm struck, and 40 people in Georgetown on Exuma island evacuated.

While moving through the Bahamas, Lili produced 92 mph (148 km/h) in 10–minute sustained winds on San Salvador Island. On Great Exuma island, there was an estimated 15 ft (4.6 m) storm tide, mostly on the southwestern portion, which caused beach erosion and some coral damage. At French Bay, waves destroyed the public dock. Effects were worst on the western portion, including damaged houses and sunk boats. Hotels sustained heavy roof damage in Cockburn Town and Victoria Hill. The storm also knocked down trees, and sea spray damaged some crops. On Long Island, the storm damaged crops and a few houses. Overall damage in the Bahamas was described as "scattered", and not affecting any tourism areas.

=== United Kingdom ===
Wettest tropical cyclones and their remnants in the United Kingdom Highest-known totals
Precipitation			Storm	Location	Ref.
Rank	mm	in	Storm	Location	Ref.
1	150.0	5.91	Bertha 2014	Inverness, Highland	
2	135.0	5.31	Charley 1986	Abergwyngregyn, Gwynedd	
3	130.0	5.12	Nadine 2012	Ravensworth, North Yorkshire	
4	76.0	2.99	Lili 1996	Chale Bay, Isle of Wight	
5	61.7	2.43	Zeta 2020	Chipping, Lancashire	
6	48.8	1.92	Grace 2009	Capel Curig, Conwy	
7	42.2	1.66	Gordon 2006	Wainfleet All Saints, Lincolnshire	
8	38.0	1.50	Gonzalo 2014	Glenmoriston, Highland	
9	31.0	1.22	Bill 2009	Shap, Cumbria	
10	30.0	1.18	Laura 2008	Windermere, Cumbria	

On October 28, the extratropical remnants of Lili moved over Ireland and the United Kingdom, considered the strongest storm to affect the area since 1961. Alderney in the Channel Islands reported 52 mph (84 km/h) winds, with gusts to 90 mph (144 km/h). Swansea in Wales reported gusts of 92 mph (148 km/h), leaving thousands of houses without power in the region. The remnants of Lili produced 15 ft (4.6 m) waves in Bristol Channel, which heavily damaged about 500 cottages in Somerset. 40 ft (12 m) waves in the North Sea removed an oil platform from its moorings, which nearly washed ashore near Peterhead until a line was reconnected. A 4 ft (1.2 m) storm tide along the River Thames flooding coastal areas, and high waves washed a 75-foot-long (23 m) sailboat ashore on Chale Bay in the Isle of Wight. The remnants of Lili also dropped about 3 in (76 mm) of rainfall, which alleviated drought conditions. The storm killed six people in Great Britain – four were related to traffic accidents, and two fishermen were swept into the sea. Damage was estimated at $300 million (1996 USD, £150 million in 1996 pound sterling), making it the costliest storm in the United Kingdom since the Great Storm of 1987.

== Aftermath ==
On October 20, the government of Cuba issued an appeal to the international community for assistance. The Red Cross provided $1.6 million to the country, and various departments of the United Nations provided $80,000. The government of Japan sent about $104,000 worth of medical equipment, and Italy sent about $526,000 worth of medical supplies. The Canadian Red Cross donated a water purification unit, and the Spanish Red Cross sent blankets and cots. The German Red Cross also sent mattresses and blankets. The American Red Cross sent 9.5 tons of food. Several other countries sent assistance, including the European Commission which sent $750,000 worth of supplies. There were early difficulties in transporting the relief supplies due to fuel shortages. Due to storm damage, 66,881 people resided in shelters until their houses were rebuilt, or until they moved elsewhere. By March 1997, most people had returned to their homes, although some did so without a roof. There was a threat for water-borne diseases due to stagnant waters, although no such outbreaks occurred. The storm decreased the supply of the banana crop in 1997, coupled with a drought.

Following two small private U.S. planes being shot down in Cuban airspace in February 1996, United States President Bill Clinton banned charter flights between the two nations. After the storm, the ban was lifted to allow the Caritas charity to fly a plane with supplies to Cuba. Some Cuban Americans in South Florida donated to help the affected Cuban victims, but others did not for fear it would assist the regime of President Fidel Castro. The plane landed on October 26 with 36.5 tons of supplies, carrying about 30 tons of food and the remainder in the form of construction material. Only 23 tons of rice, beans, and milk were distributed. The Cuban government rejected the remaining seven tons due to the parcels containing inscriptions other than "Caritas" or "CRS", such as "exile" or other messages against the communist party. The rejected aid was sent to the Dominican Republic or back to Miami. Catholic Relief Services later sent $252,000 worth of medicine, and sent a second flight of aid in January 1997 with 43 tons of rice, cooking oil, and flour.

== See also ==
- Other tropical cyclones named Lili
- List of wettest tropical cyclones in Cuba since 1963
- Tropical cyclone effects in Europe
- Hurricane Fox (1952)
- Hurricane Irene (1999) – October hurricane that struck Cuba
- Hurricane Michelle (2001)
- Hurricane Paloma (2008)
