= List of storms named Lili =

The name Lili has been used for six tropical cyclones worldwide: four in the Atlantic Ocean, one in the Australian region of the Indian Ocean, and one in the South Pacific Ocean.

In the Atlantic:

- Hurricane Lili (1984) – off-season Category 1 hurricane that remained over the open ocean.
- Hurricane Lili (1990) – Category 1 hurricane that approached the East Coast of the United States but remained far offshore.
- Hurricane Lili (1996) – Category 3 hurricane formed near Central America, made landfall in Cuba, traversed the Bahamas and then impacted the British Isles as an extratropical storm.
- Hurricane Lili (2002) – Category 4 hurricane that impacted the Windward Islands, Jamaica, Haiti and the Southeast United States, causing $925 million (2002 USD) in damages and killing 15 people.

The name Lili was retired in Atlantic basin following the 2002 season and was replaced with Laura for the 2008 season.

In the Australian region:

- Cyclone Lili (2019) – off-season tropical cyclone that affected the Maluku Islands and East Timor.

In the South Pacific:

- Cyclone Lili (1989) – severe tropical cyclone that impacted New Caledonia.
