= Cyclone Lili (2019) =

Category 1 tropical cyclone in 2019

Tropical Cyclone Lili
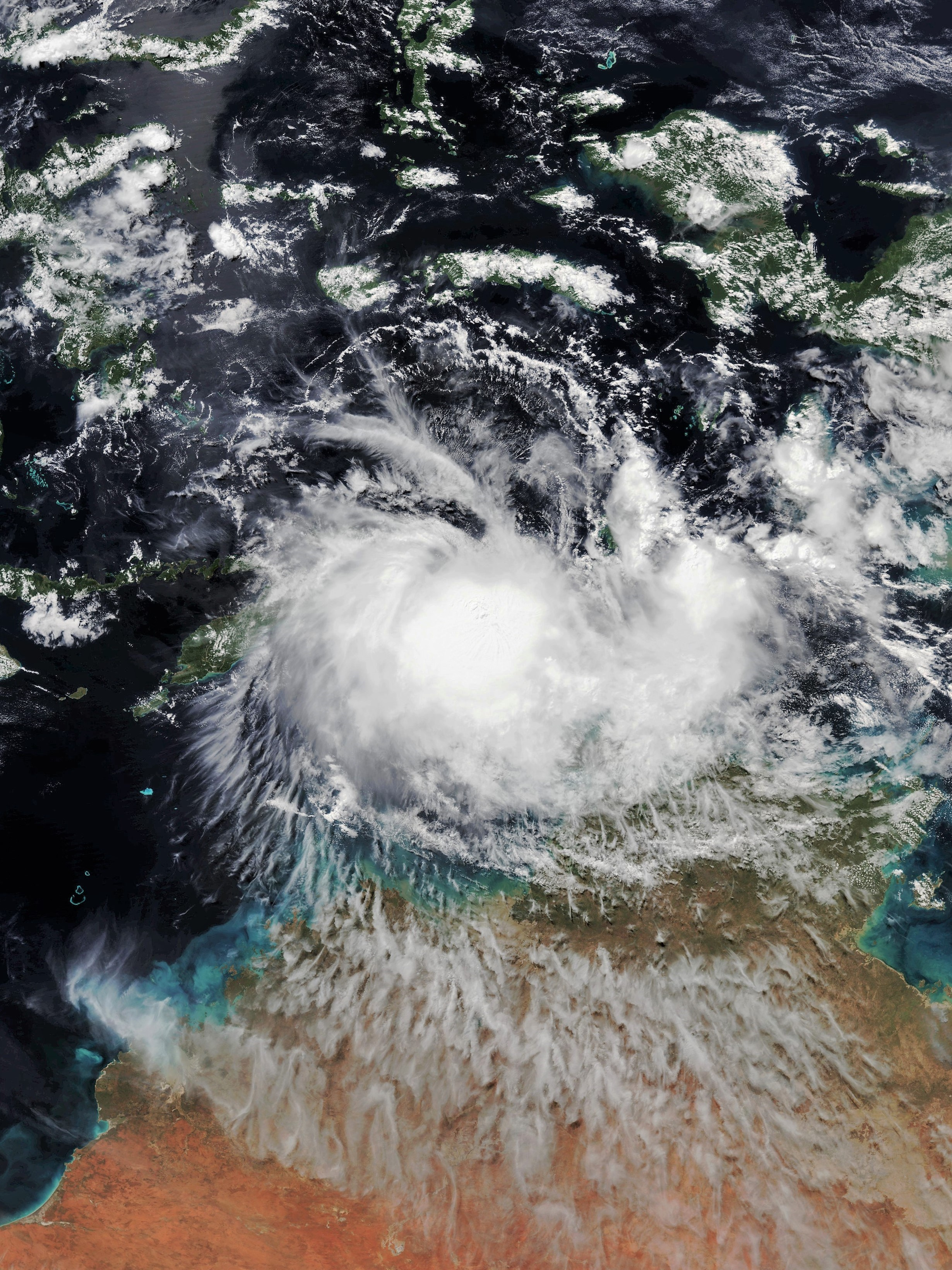
- Tropical Cyclone Lili intensifying over the Timor Sea on 9 May

Meteorological history
- Formed: 4 May 2019
- Remnant low: 10 May 2019
- Dissipated: 11 May 2019

Category 1 tropical cyclone
- 10-minute sustained (BOM)
- Highest winds: 75 km/h (45 mph)
- Highest gusts: 100 km/h (65 mph)
- Lowest pressure: 996 hPa (mbar); 29.41 inHg

Tropical storm
- 1-minute sustained (SSHWS/JTWC)
- Highest winds: 100 km/h (65 mph)
- Lowest pressure: 993 hPa (mbar); 29.32 inHg

Overall effects
- Fatalities: None
- Damage: Moderate
- Areas affected: Eastern Indonesia, East Timor, Top End
- IBTrACS /
- Part of the 2018–19 Australian region cyclone season

Tropical Cyclone Lili was a small and relatively weak off-season tropical cyclone that brought moderate impacts to the Maluku Islands and East Timor, and mild impacts to other parts of eastern Indonesia and far-northern Australia. It was the latest tropical cyclone to exist in the Australian Bureau of Meteorology's northern tropical cyclone region on record, surpassing Severe Tropical Cyclone Verna of 1977. Lili was the tenth tropical cyclone of the 2018–19 Australian region cyclone season, and the second of which to be named by the Indonesian Agency for Meteorology, Climatology and Geophysics. Lili originated from a tropical low that formed over the Banda Sea on 4 May 2019. The system gradually organised as it tracked slowly southwards, and strengthened into a Category 1 tropical cyclone on the Australian scale on 9 May. Lili reached peak intensity later that day, with ten-minute sustained winds of 75 km/h (47 mph) and a central barometric pressure of 997 hPa (29.44 inHg). The Joint Typhoon Warning Center estimated one-minute mean winds at this time to be at 100 km/h (62 mph). Weakening commenced soon thereafter, and the system fell below cyclone intensity on 10 May after turning to the west. Lili made landfall in northern East Timor the following day as a weak tropical low, and dissipated shortly afterwards.

Lili's precursor tropical low caused significant flooding in several villages in Indonesia's Maluku province as a result of heavy rainfall. Flooding also occurred in many locations throughout East Timor, causing damage to infrastructure and cutting off roads. Strong winds were experienced along the length of the cyclone's track, as well as on exposed coastal sections of far-northern Australia; namely the Top End and northern Kimberley, and nearby islands. No injuries or fatalities were reported in connection with the cyclone.

== Meteorological history ==
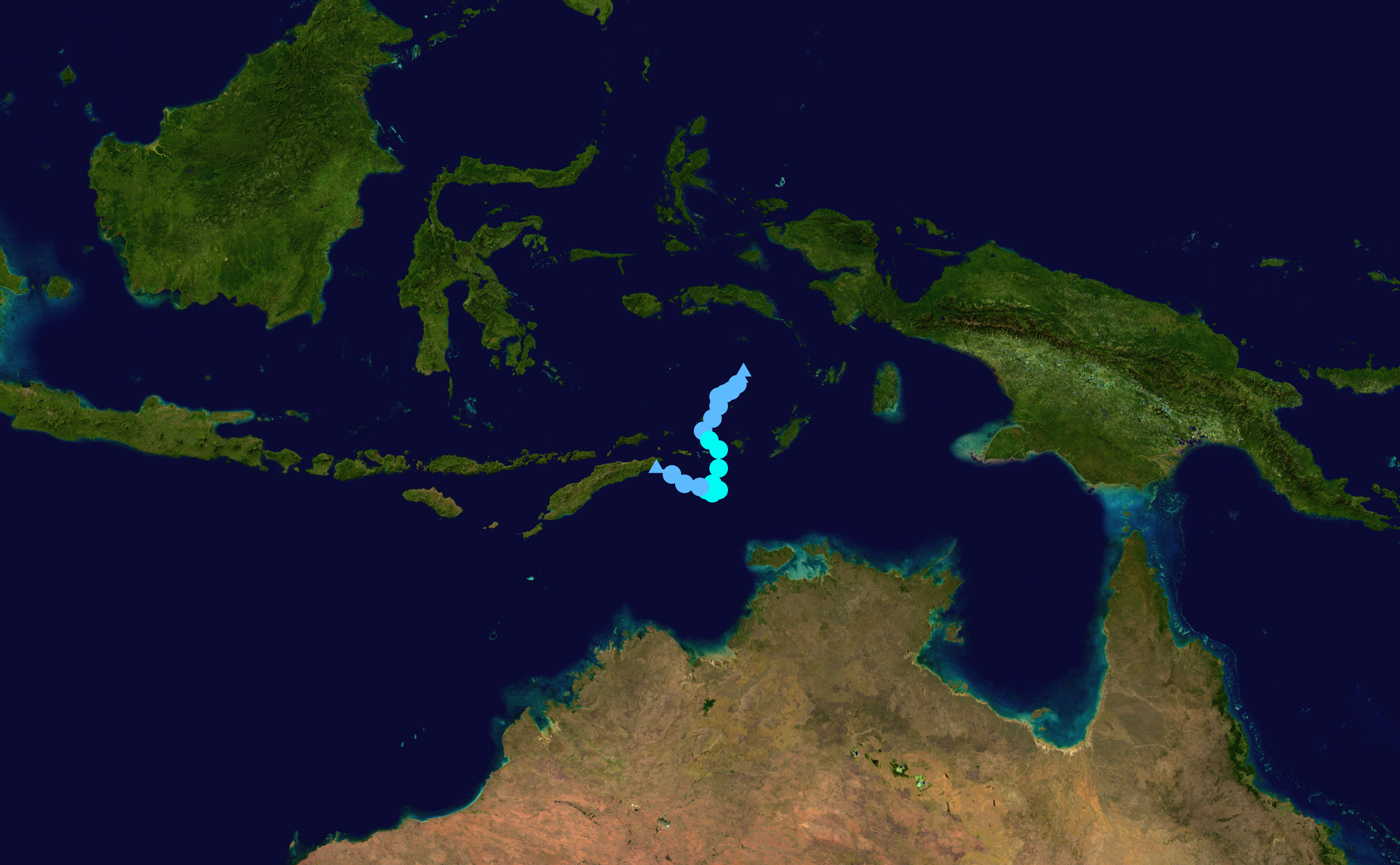
Map plotting the storm's track and intensity, according to the Saffir–Simpson scale Map key Saffir–Simpson scale Tropical depression (≤38 mph, ≤62 km/h) Tropical storm (39–73 mph, 63–118 km/h) Category 1 (74–95 mph, 119–153 km/h) Category 2 (96–110 mph, 154–177 km/h) Category 3 (111–129 mph, 178–208 km/h) Category 4 (130–156 mph, 209–251 km/h) Category 5 (≥157 mph, ≥252 km/h) Unknown Storm type Tropical cyclone Subtropical cyclone Extratropical cyclone, remnant low, tropical disturbance, or monsoon depression

A moderate to strong pulse of the Madden-Julian Oscillation moved eastwards across the Maritime Continent during early May, generating unseasonal monsoonal activity throughout the Indonesian archipelago and far-northern Australia. The presence of the pulse generated favourable conditions for tropical cyclogenesis in the seas to the north of the Australian continent. This was despite May being outside the traditional bounds of the Australian region cyclone season, which officially concludes on 30 April each year. On 4 May, the Australian Bureau of Meteorology (BOM) noted the formation of a weak tropical low approximately 750 km (470 mi) to the north-northwest of Darwin, embedded within a low-pressure trough extending from Borneo to New Guinea.

Over the next few days, the tropical low moved slowly southwards over the Banda Sea while its central barometric pressure gradually deepened. The system was located within a very favourable environment for further development, with sea surface temperatures of 29–30 °C (84–86 °F), an excellent upper-level poleward outflow channel and low vertical wind shear. The United States' Joint Typhoon Warning Center (JTWC) issued a tropical cyclone formation alert at 17:30 UTC on 7 May, noting that formative cloud bands had begun to wrap around the consolidating low-level circulation centre. By this time, winds near gale-force had developed within deep convection in the system's western semicircle. The storm tracked through the southern Maluku Islands at just below tropical cyclone intensity on 8–9 May, and subsequently passed into the northeastern Timor Sea. The system intensified into a Category 1 tropical cyclone on the Australian scale at 03:00 UTC on 9 May—the tenth tropical cyclone of the 2018–19 Australian region cyclone season. Located just within Tropical Cyclone Warning Centre Jakarta's area of responsibility, the storm was named Lili by the Indonesian Agency for Meteorology, Climatology and Geophysics (BMKG). Following suit three hours later, the JTWC assessed the system as the equivalent of a tropical storm.

Lili continued slowly southwards towards Australia during 9 May. Despite the otherwise favourable environmental conditions, the development of the storm was hindered by the presence of dry air in the middle and upper layers of the troposphere. Following only a small amount of further intensification, Lili reached peak intensity at 18:00 UTC on 9 May, while located halfway between Timor and the Tiwi Islands. As a mid-range Category 1 tropical cyclone, Lili had ten-minute sustained winds of 75 km/h (47 mph), gusting to 100 km/h (62 mph), and a minimum barometric pressure of 997 hPa (29.44 inHg). The JTWC indicated that one-minute mean winds of 85 km/h (53 mph) were present at the storm's centre. Lili began to decay soon afterwards, as dry air continued to infiltrate the cyclone's inner core and the frictional effects of land interaction inhibited the storm's circulation. Wind velocity decreased steadily, and the BMKG indicated that the system had fallen below tropical cyclone intensity at 12:00 UTC on 10 May. Assuming a westwards track under the influence of a strong subtropical ridge anchored over Australia, the system's structure continued to deteriorate. The JTWC issued their final warning on the system at 21:00 UTC, noting that deep convection had become almost entirely absent, leaving the storm's low-level circulation centre exposed. Lili accelerated west-northwestwards across the Timor Sea, before dissipating while making landfall in northern East Timor, at 06:00 UTC on 11 May.

== Impacts ==
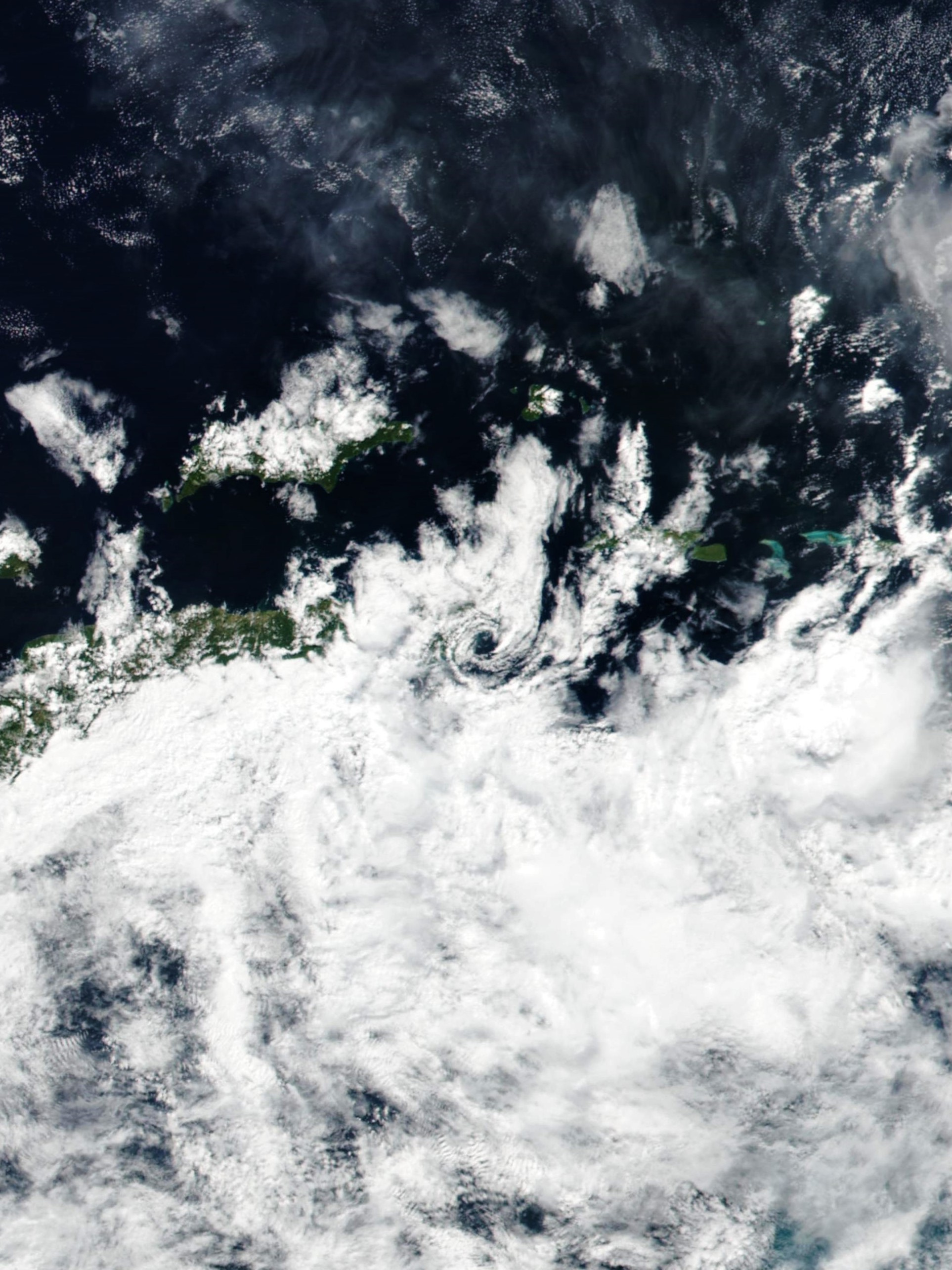
Ex-Tropical Cyclone Lili making landfall in northeastern East Timor on 11 May 2019, just prior to dissipation

Prior to development into a tropical cyclone, Lili's precursor tropical low tracked southwards across the southern Banda Sea, bringing the storm near Indonesia's Maluku Islands. Heavy rainfall and strong winds were experienced on the islands for several days, with impacts peaking at around 12:00 UTC on 8 May. The prolonged rainfall caused significant flooding in numerous places across the region, with the most severe effects occurring in the Southeast Maluku Regency. In particular, the villages of Laitutun on Leti Island; Tounwawan in Moa Lakor; and Luang Timur in Mdona Hiera, experienced major inundation to an average depth of 1.5 m (4.9 ft). The flooding and strong winds resulted in widespread damage in the villages. Many houses and numerous public facilities sustained damage, causing many residents to be displaced. Lili's strong winds also generated dangerous sea conditions, reportedly causing a ship to sink.

Despite not making landfall at tropical cyclone strength, Ex-Tropical Cyclone Lili caused significant impacts in East Timor. Protracted periods of heavy rainfall, with widespread 24-hour totals of 100–150 mm (3.9–5.9 in), led to river level rise and subsequent flooding. Many roads, bridges and other pieces of infrastructure were damaged by flooding, especially in the eastern half of the country. Other roads and bridges were also cut off or threatened by floodwaters. The primary road link from Lospalos to the national capital Dili was covered by mud and water, severely impeding the passage of traffic. Damage was sustained in the Baucau municipality from riverine flooding. A truck was also submerged in a swollen stream in the south of the country. Damaging winds were experienced on the eastern tip of East Timor, with gusts of approximately 75–100 km/h (47–62 mph).

Mild impacts were also experienced across large areas of eastern Indonesia and sections of exposed coastline in the Northern Territory, northern Kimberley, and nearby islands. Strong winds and enhanced rainfall occurred throughout the region, as well as large waves and strong tides. McCluer Island, situated 30 km (19 mi) off the northern coast of the Top End; and Troughton Island, located 15 km (9.3 mi) off Western Australia's far-northern coast, both experienced sustained winds exceeding 50 km/h (31 mph), with gusts reaching 63 km/h (39 mph). Strong winds and moderate rainfall were also observed in the Indonesian provinces of West Nusa Tenggara and East Nusa Tenggara, and in parts of Sulawesi. At peak intensity, the BMKG reported that Lili's winds were generating waves of up to 6.0 m (19.7 ft) in height in parts of the Timor and Arafura Seas. Waves of up to 4.0 m (13.1 ft) in height were also generated in the ocean and waterways surrounding several islands further to the west.

== See also ==
- Other tropical cyclones named Lili
- Tropical Cyclone Esther (1983)—a storm with a similar track to Lili
- Tropical Depression 19S (2012)—another off-season system with a similar track to Lili
- Severe Tropical Cyclone Verna (1977)—the previous record-holder for the latest tropical cyclone to exist in the BOM's northern tropical cyclone region
- Extremely Severe Cyclonic Storm Fani—the MJO pulse which contributed to Lili's development also contributed to Fani's intensification
