= List of storms named Gretel =

The name Gretel has been used for two tropical cyclones in the Australian region:

- Cyclone Gretel (1985) – a Category 2 tropical cyclone that affected the Northern Territory.
- Cyclone Gretel (2020) – a Category 2 tropical cyclone that crossed into the South Pacific Ocean.

== See also ==
- Cyclone Gretelle (1997) – a South-West Indian Ocean tropical cyclone with a similar name.
