= List of storms named Vernon =

The name Vernon has been used for seven tropical cyclones worldwide, five in the Western Pacific Ocean and two in the Australian region.

In the Western Pacific:

- Typhoon Vernon (1980) (T8018, 20W) – relatively strong typhoon which stayed at sea
- Tropical Storm Vernon (1984) (T8401, 01W) – struck Vietnam
- Typhoon Vernon (1987) (T8706, 06W, Diding) – passed northeast of the Philippines and skirted Taiwan
- Typhoon Vernon (1990) (T9014, 11W) – briefly threatened Japan before turning northeast, eventually affecting no land areas
- Typhoon Vernon (1993) (T9313, 18W) – struck Japan and brought heavy rainfall, causing 2 deaths and 4 injuries

In the Australian region:

- Cyclone Vernon (1986) – moderately strong tropical storm which stayed off the coast of Queensland
- Cyclone Vernon (2022) – strong tropical cyclone that remained over the open Indian Ocean
