= 1976–77 Australian region cyclone season =

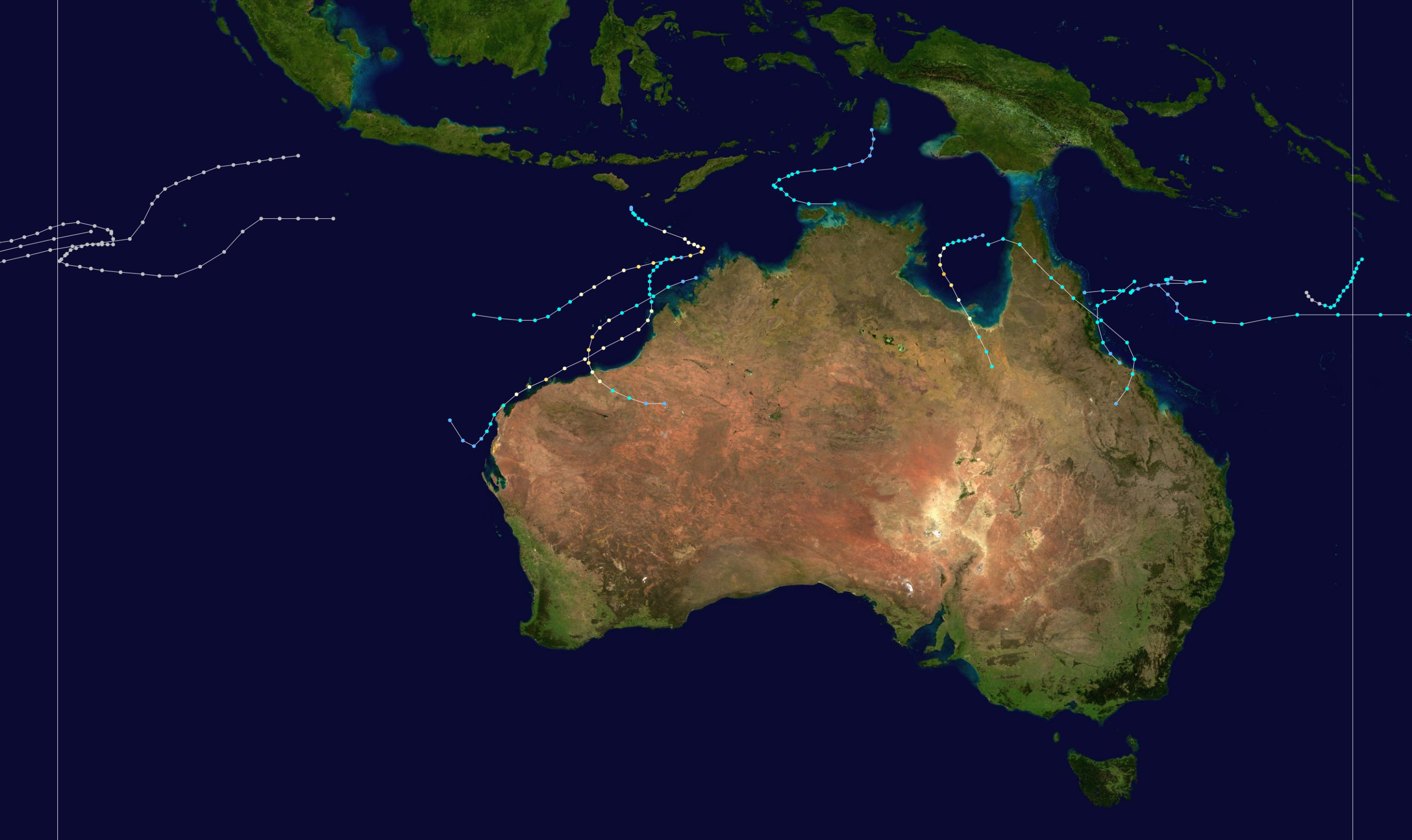
- Season summary map

Seasonal boundaries
- First system formed: 15 December 1976
- Last system dissipated: 3 May 1977

Strongest storm
- Name: Jack
  - Maximum winds: 185 km/h (115 mph) (10-minute sustained)
  - Lowest pressure: 945 hPa (mbar)

Seasonal statistics
- Tropical lows: 13
- Tropical cyclones: 13
- Severe tropical cyclones: 6
- Total fatalities: >2
- Total damage: $49 million (1977 USD)

Related articles
- 1976–77 South Pacific cyclone season; 1976–77 South-West Indian Ocean cyclone season

The 1976–77 Australian region cyclone season was a slightly above average tropical cyclone season.

== Systems ==
=== Tropical Cyclone Harry ===
- Category 3 tropical cyclone (SSHWS)
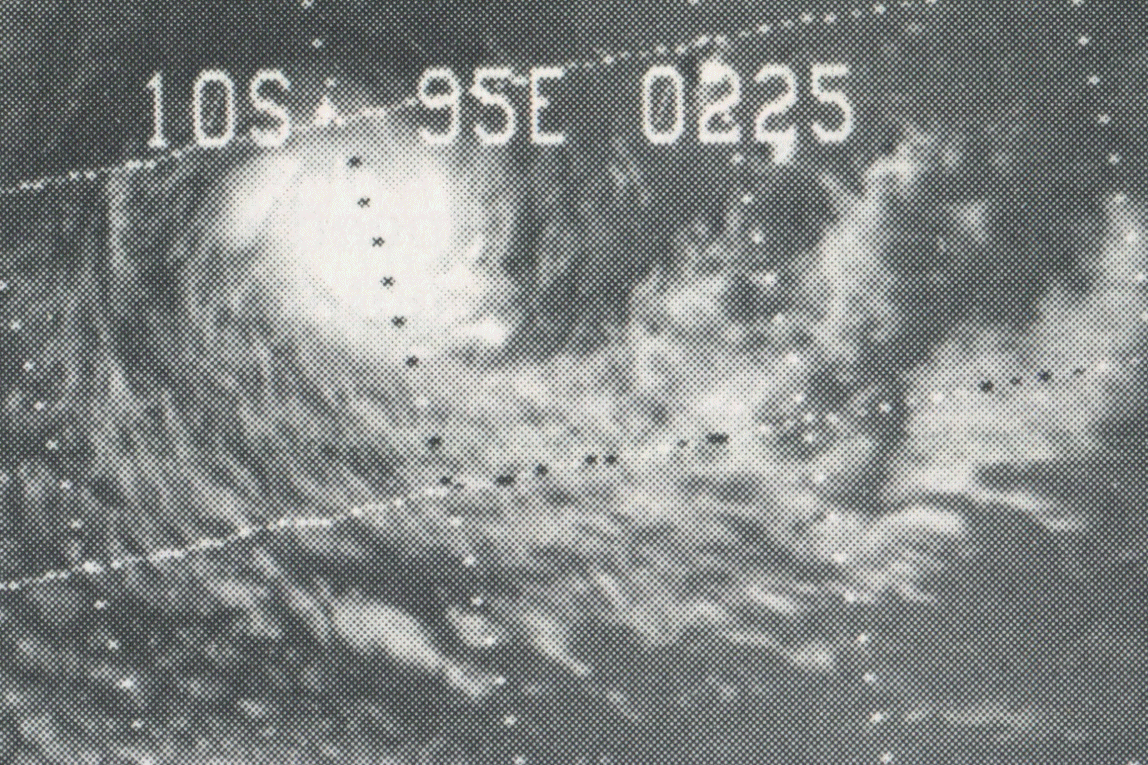
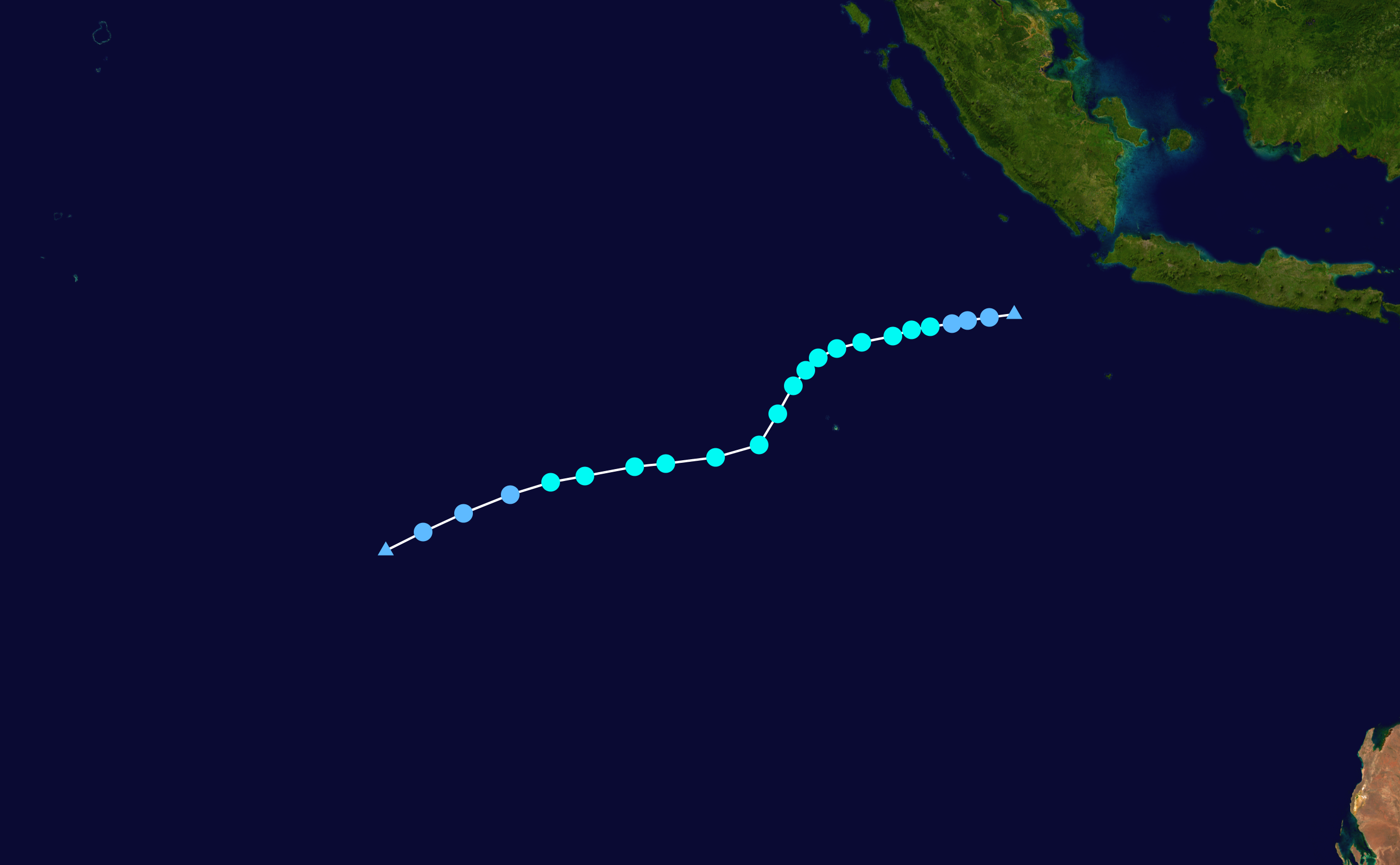
- Duration: 15 December – 21 December
- Peak intensity: 185 km/h (115 mph) (1-min); 950 hPa (mbar)

Harry formed on 15 December near the Sunda Strait, and moved west-southwest through its existence. Its maximum intensity was reached as the cyclone passed north of the Cocos-Keeling Islands. The system then weakened and dissipated well east of Madagascar.

=== Severe Tropical Cyclone Ted ===
- Category 4 severe tropical cyclone (Australian scale)
- Category 3 tropical cyclone (SSHWS)
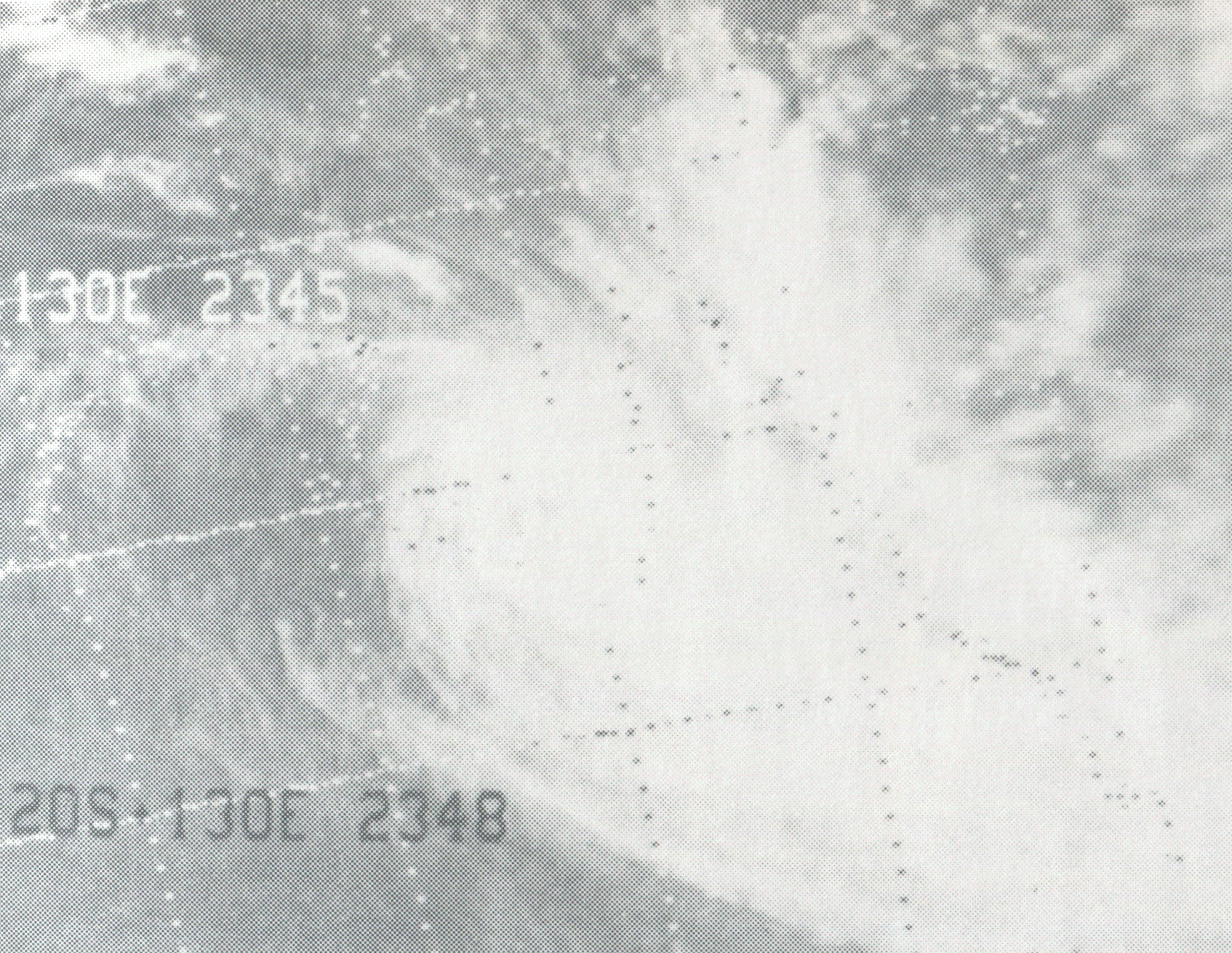
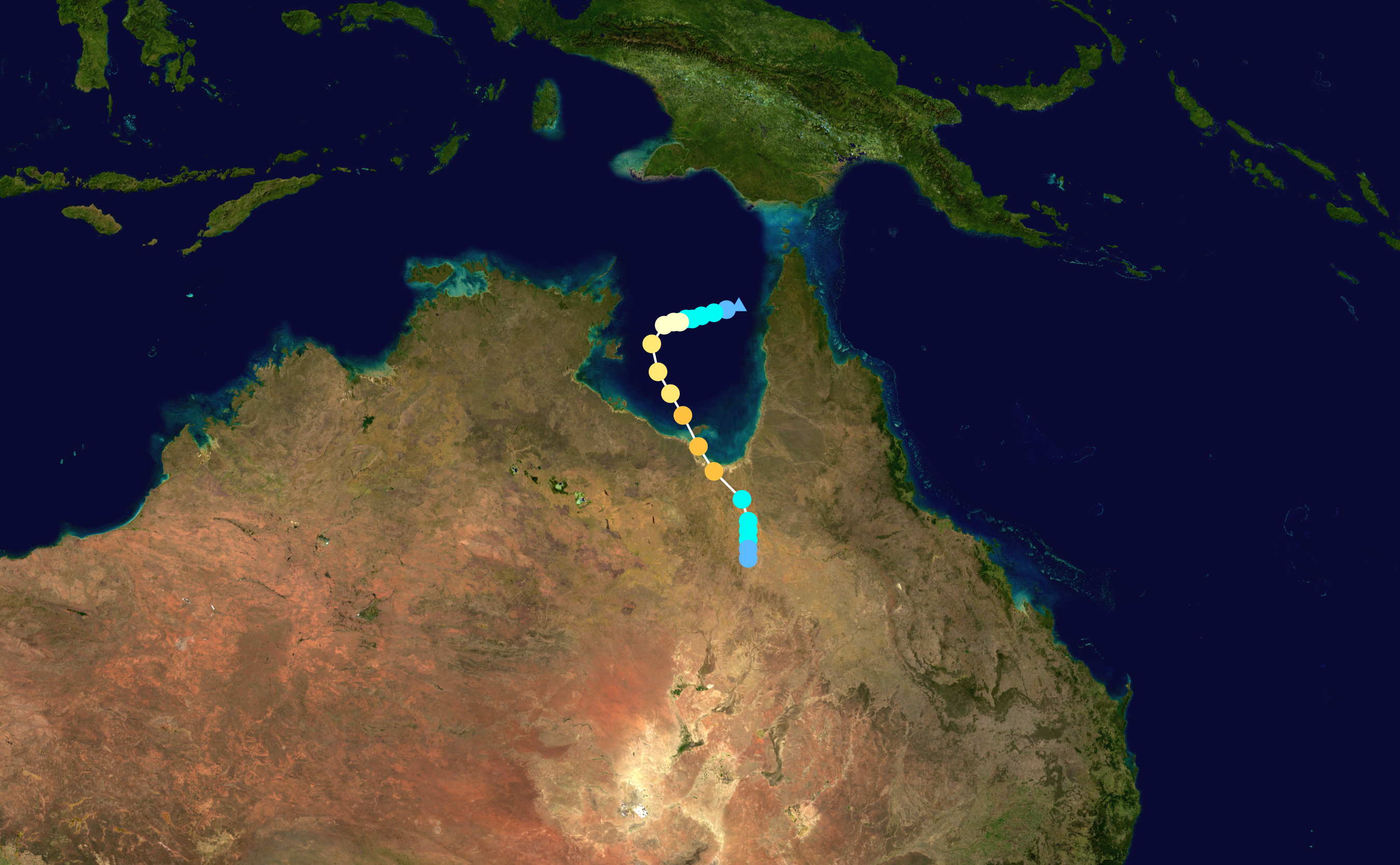
- Duration: 15 December – 20 December
- Peak intensity: 185 km/h (115 mph) (10-min); 945 hPa (mbar)

Ted made landfall in Queensland on 19 December 1976. The storm killed 2 people and left $49 million in damage.

=== Severe Tropical Cyclone Irene ===
- Category 3 severe tropical cyclone (Australian scale)
- Category 2 tropical cyclone (SSHWS)
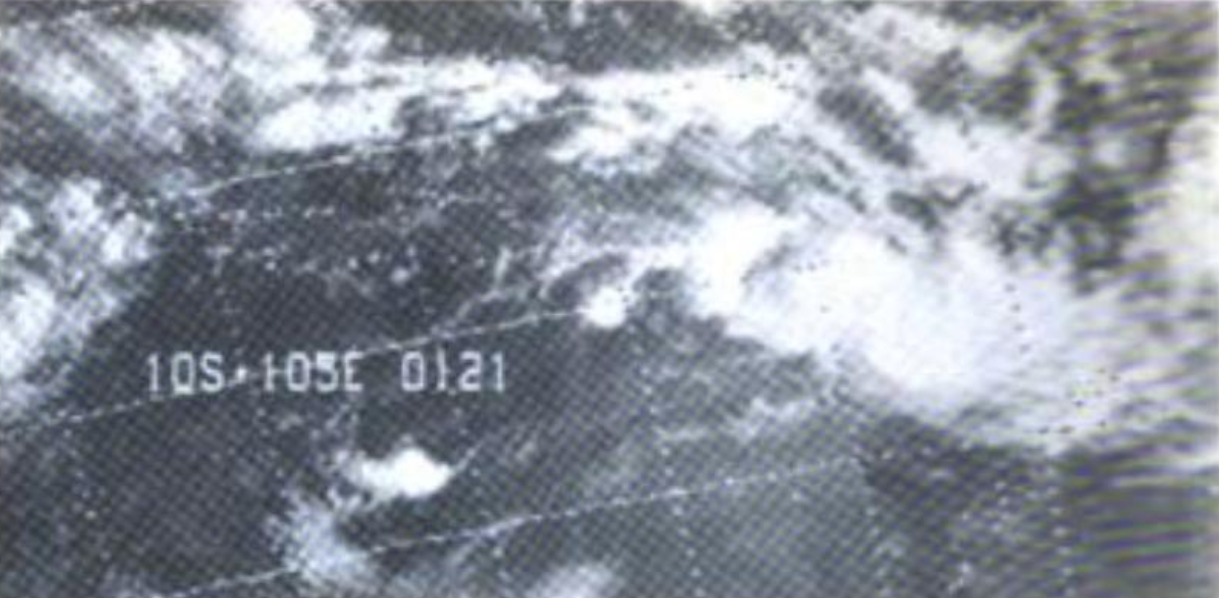
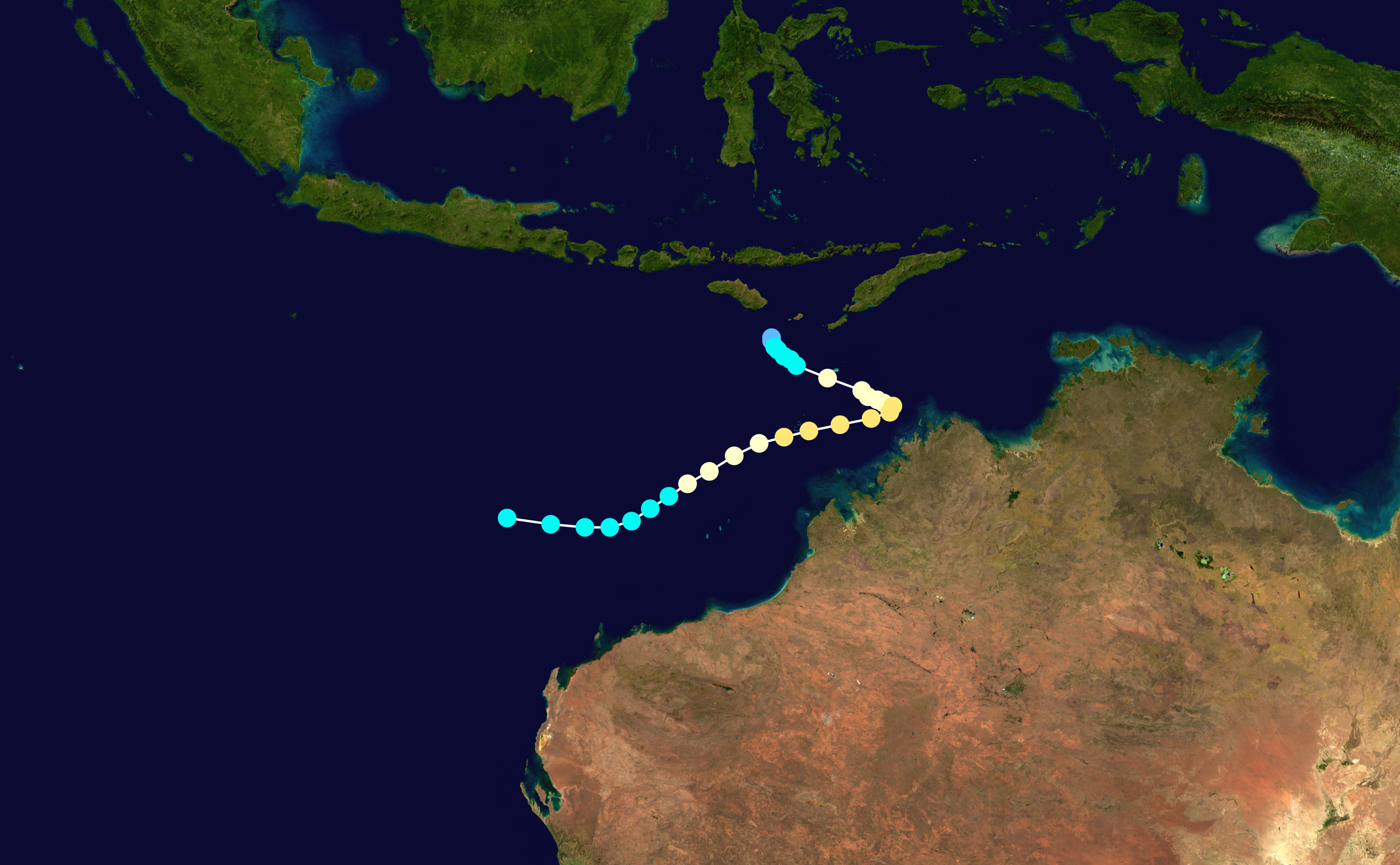
- Duration: 6 January – 13 January
- Peak intensity: 150 km/h (90 mph) (10-min); 970 hPa (mbar)

Irene was the second storm of the season, and remained over the open waters, too far away to affect the coast. Its track was abnormal in its early stages, moving in a southeast direction. It eventually recurved and moved parallel to the northwest coast.

=== Tropical Cyclone June ===
- Category 1 tropical cyclone (Australian scale)
- Tropical storm (SSHWS)
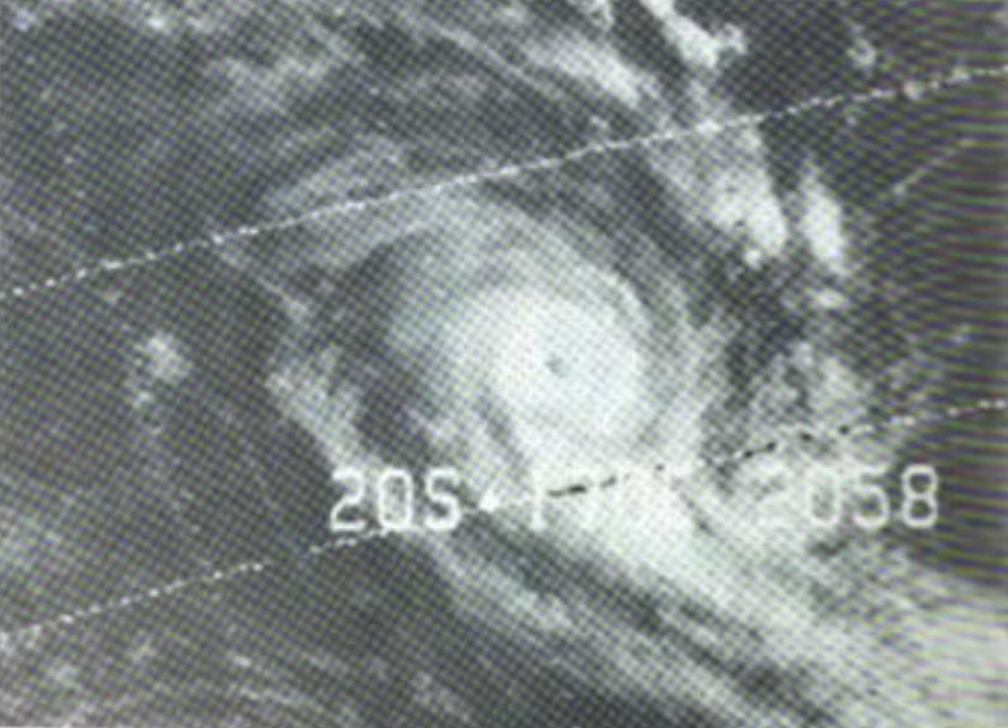
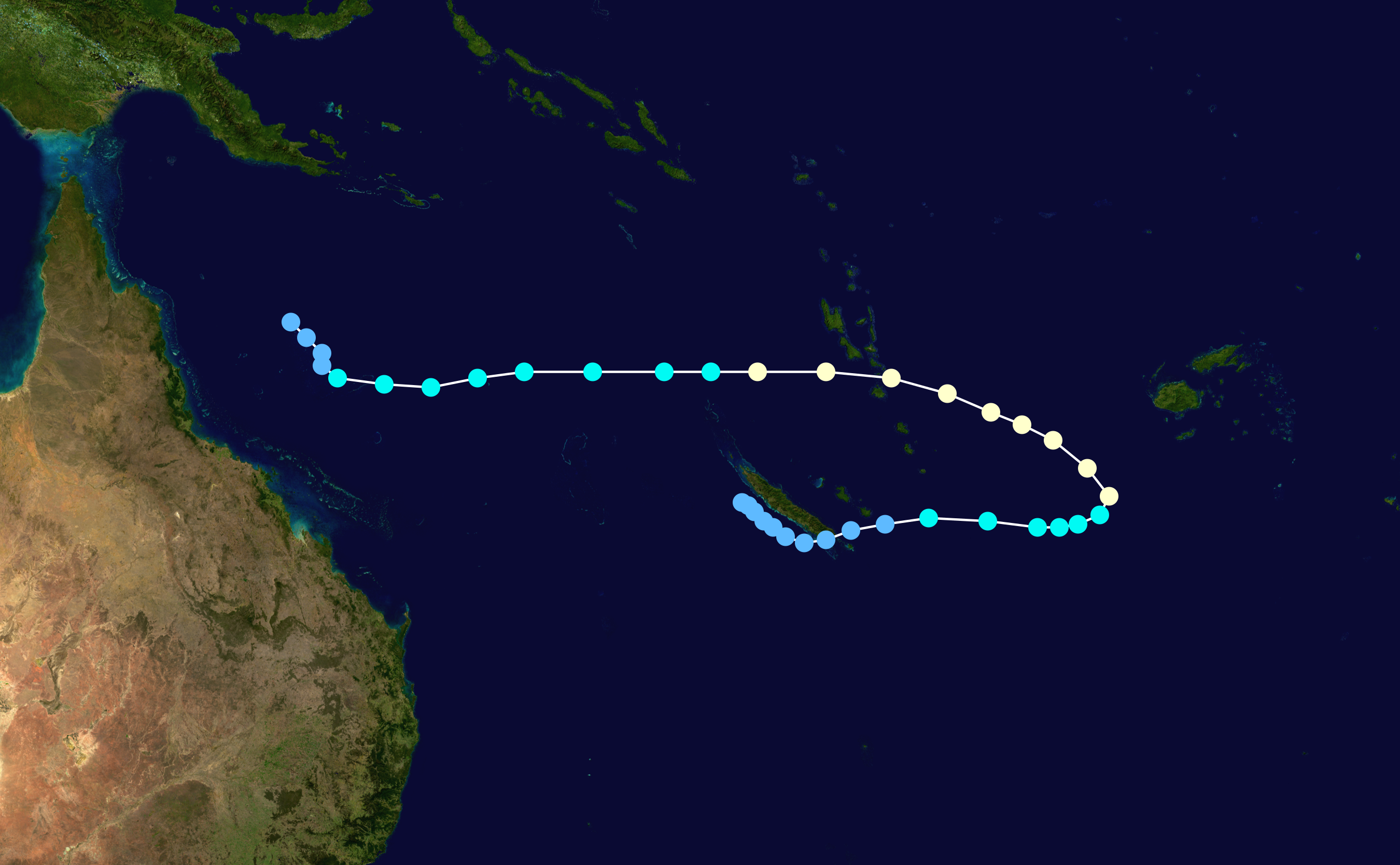
- Duration: 16 January – 19 January (Crossed 160°E)
- Peak intensity: 65 km/h (40 mph) (10-min); 994 hPa (mbar)

=== Tropical Cyclone Keith ===
- Category 1 tropical cyclone (Australian scale)
- Tropical storm (SSHWS)
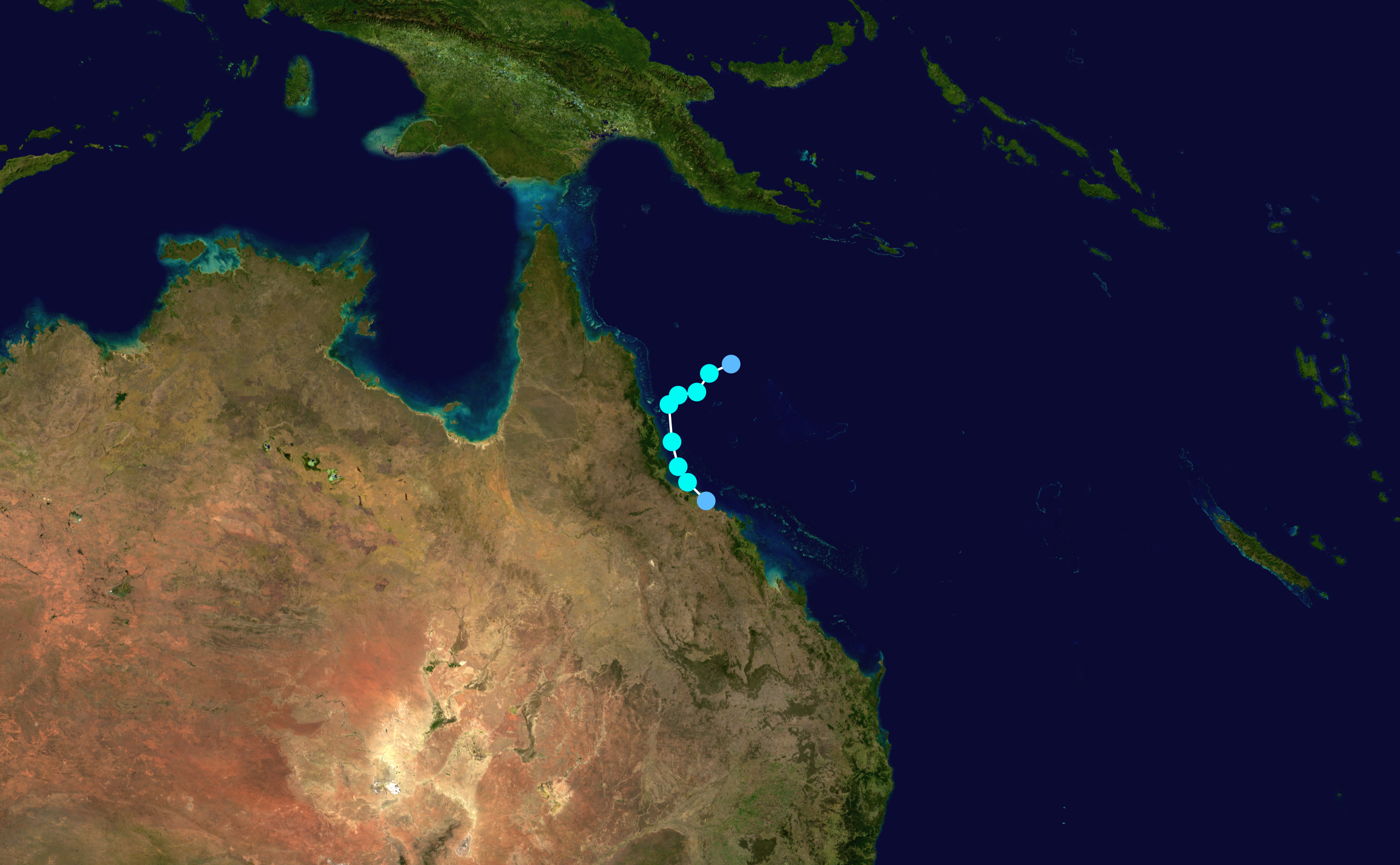
- Duration: 29 January – 1 February
- Peak intensity: 75 km/h (45 mph) (10-min); 992 hPa (mbar)

=== Tropical Cyclone Lily ===
- Category 1 tropical cyclone (Australian scale)
- Tropical storm (SSHWS)
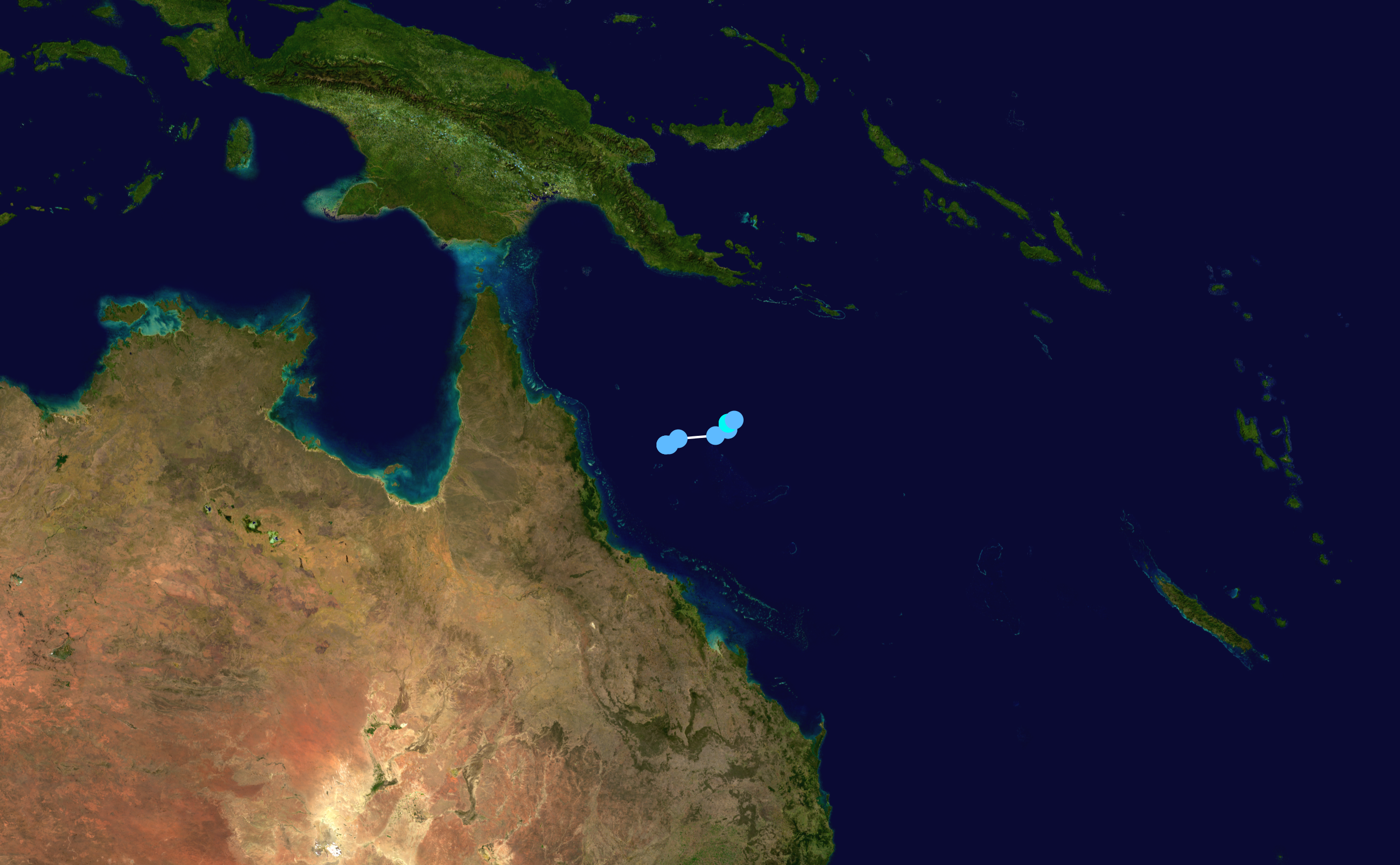
- Duration: 8 February – 12 February
- Peak intensity: 65 km/h (40 mph) (10-min); 996 hPa (mbar)

=== Tropical Cyclone Miles ===
- Category 1 tropical cyclone (Australian scale)
- Tropical storm (SSHWS)
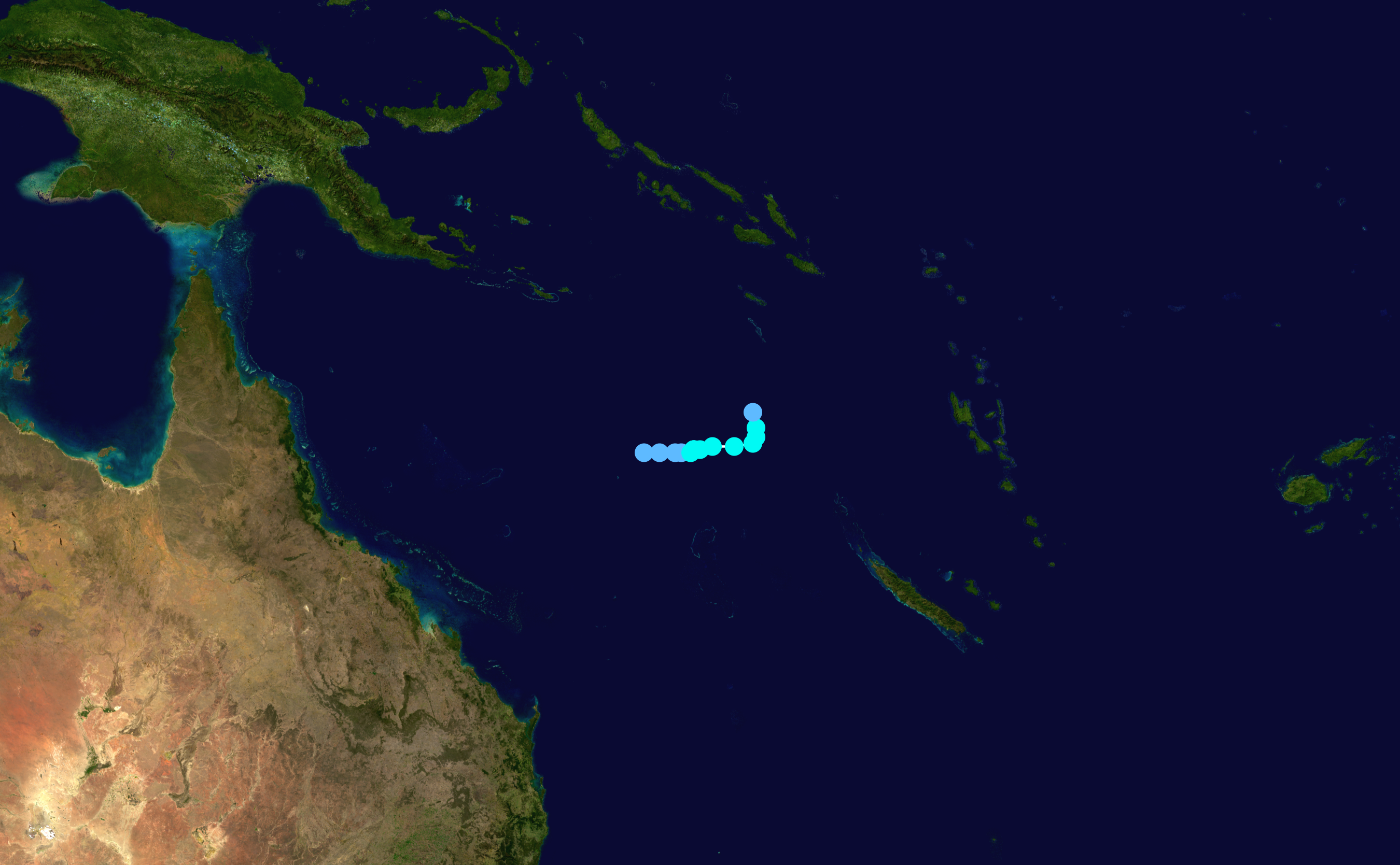
- Duration: 9 February – 13 February
- Peak intensity: 75 km/h (45 mph) (10-min); 994 hPa (mbar)

=== Tropical Cyclone Nancy ===
- Category 1 tropical cyclone (Australian scale)
- Tropical storm (SSHWS)
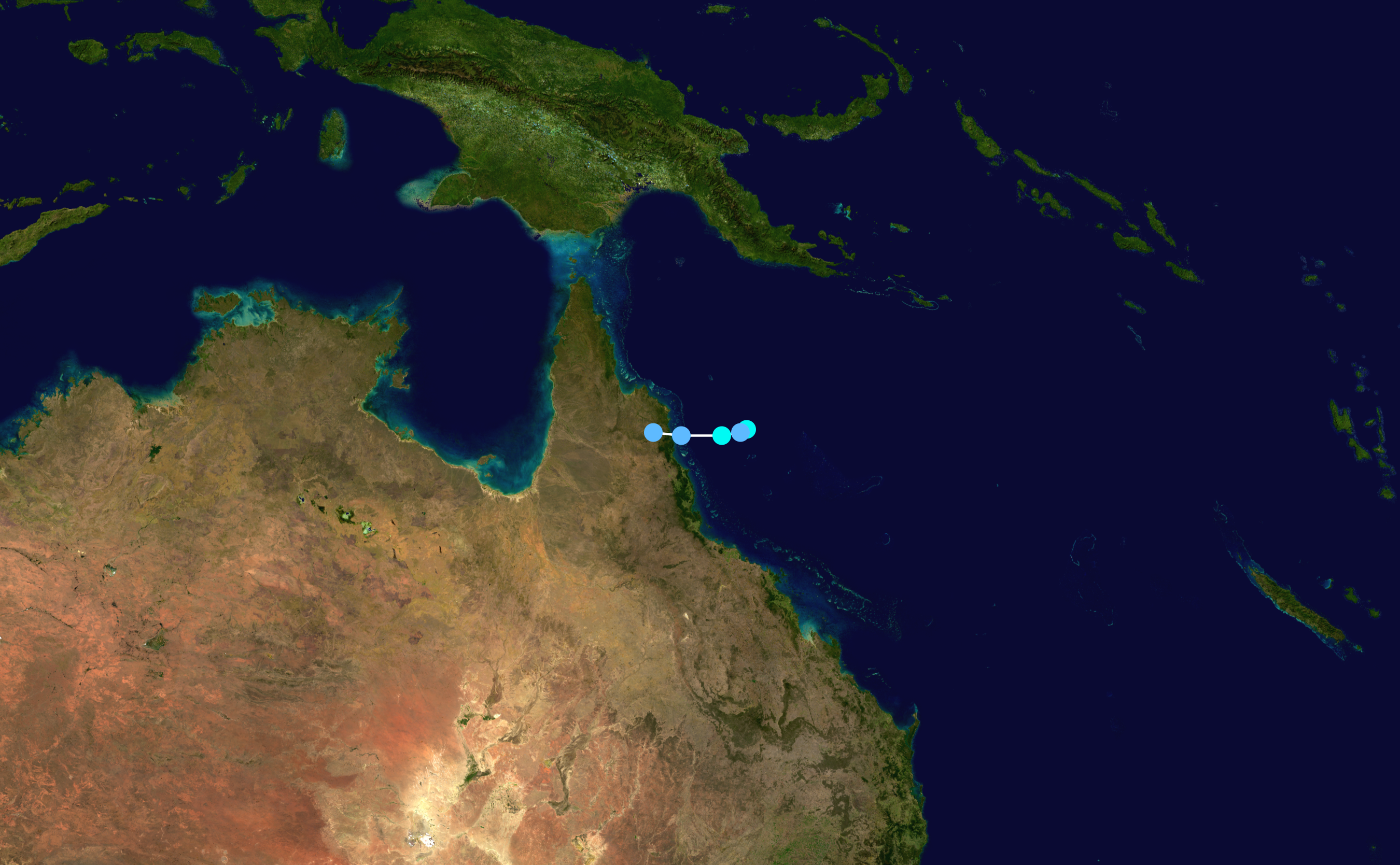
- Duration: 12 February – 13 February
- Peak intensity: 75 km/h (45 mph) (10-min); 998 hPa (mbar)

=== Severe Tropical Cyclone Jack-Io ===
- Category 4 tropical cyclone (SSHWS)
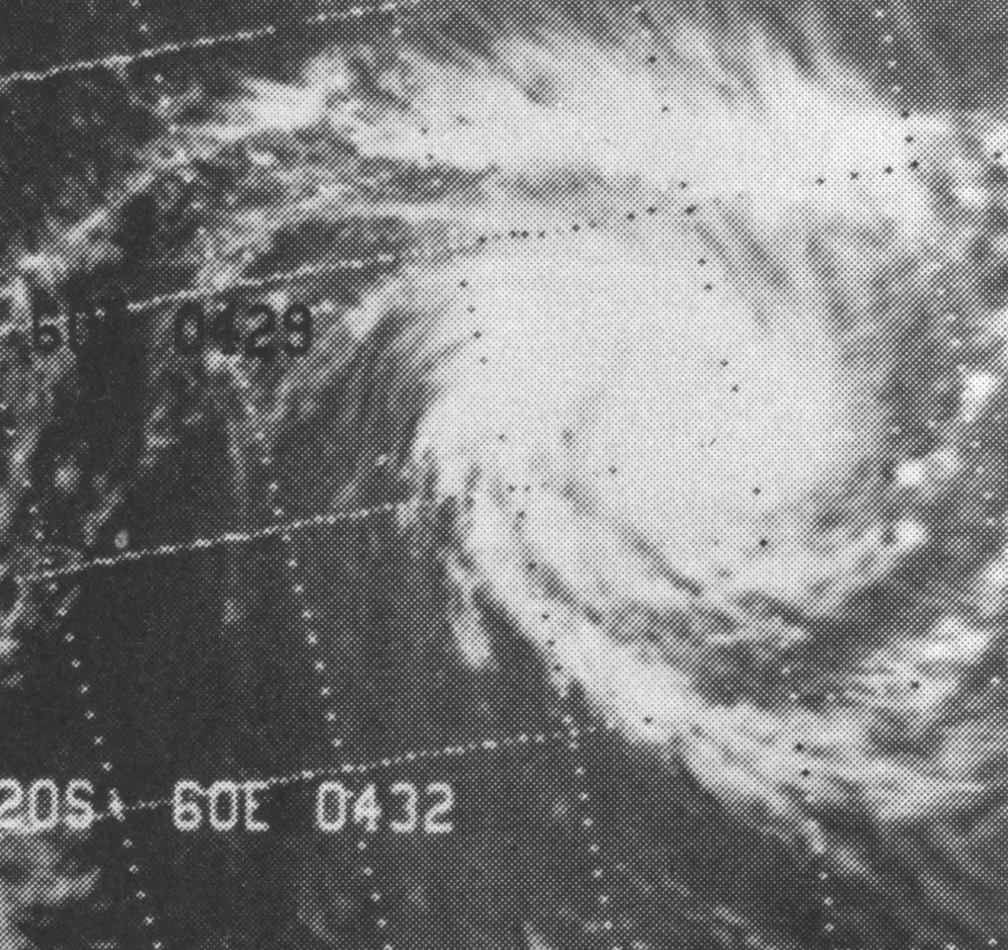
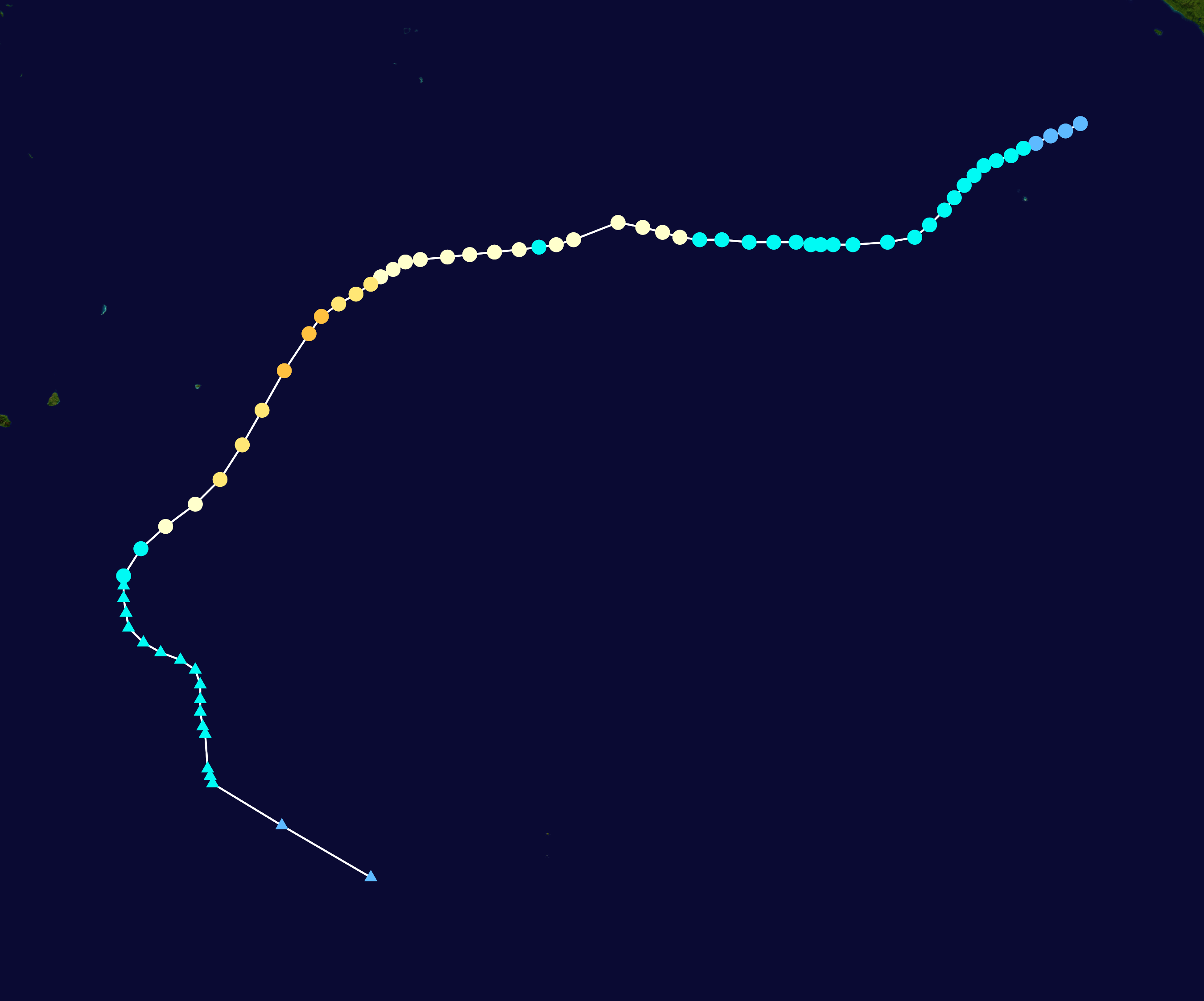
- Duration: 13 February – 20 February (Crossed 80°E)
- Peak intensity: 215 km/h (130 mph) (1-min); 945 hPa (mbar)

=== Severe Tropical Cyclone Karen ===
- Category 3 severe tropical cyclone (Australian scale)
- Category 2 tropical cyclone (SSHWS)
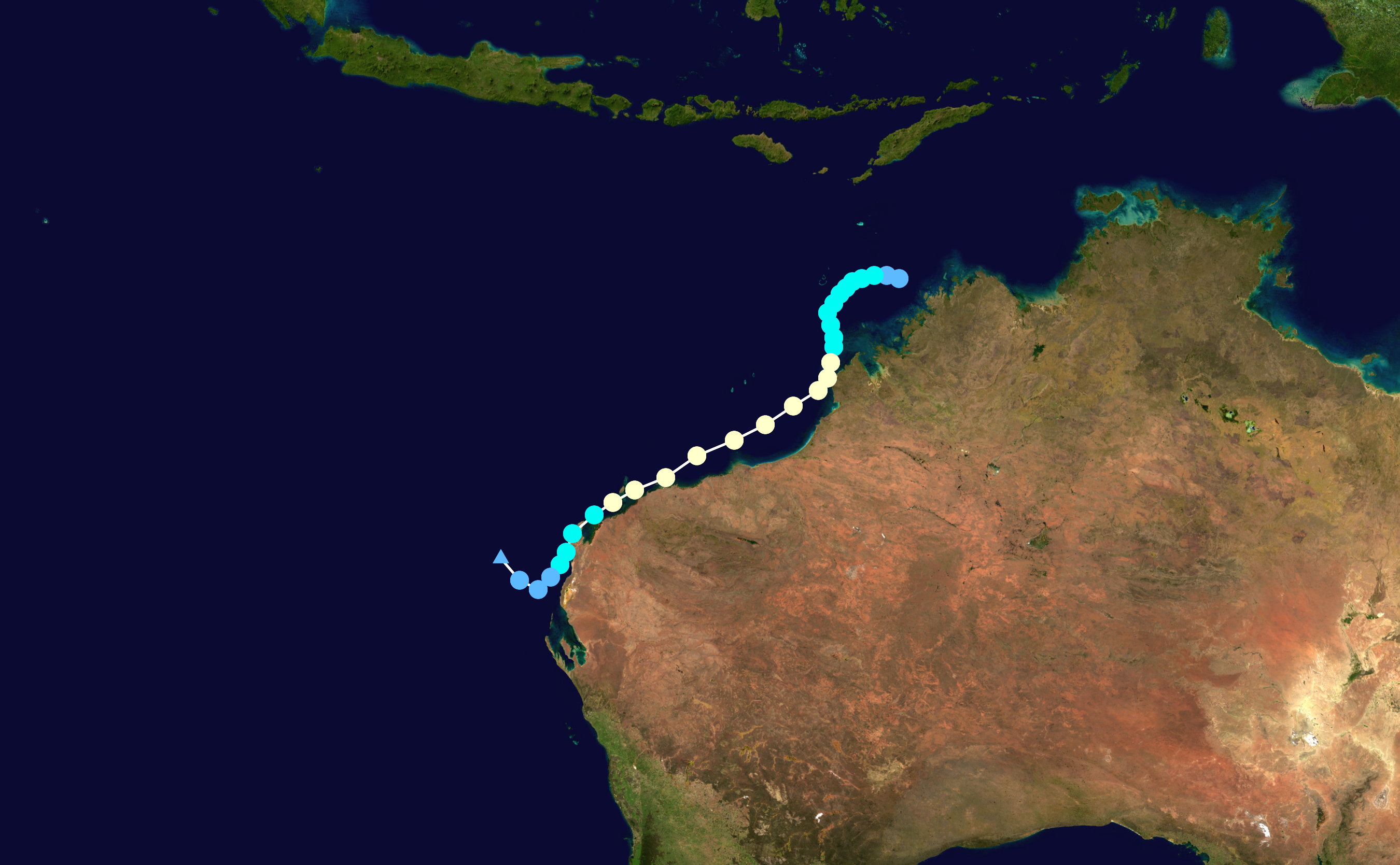
- Duration: 2 March – 9 March
- Peak intensity: 150 km/h (90 mph) (10-min); 970 hPa (mbar)

=== Tropical Cyclone Otto ===
- Category 1 tropical cyclone (Australian scale)
- Tropical storm (SSHWS)
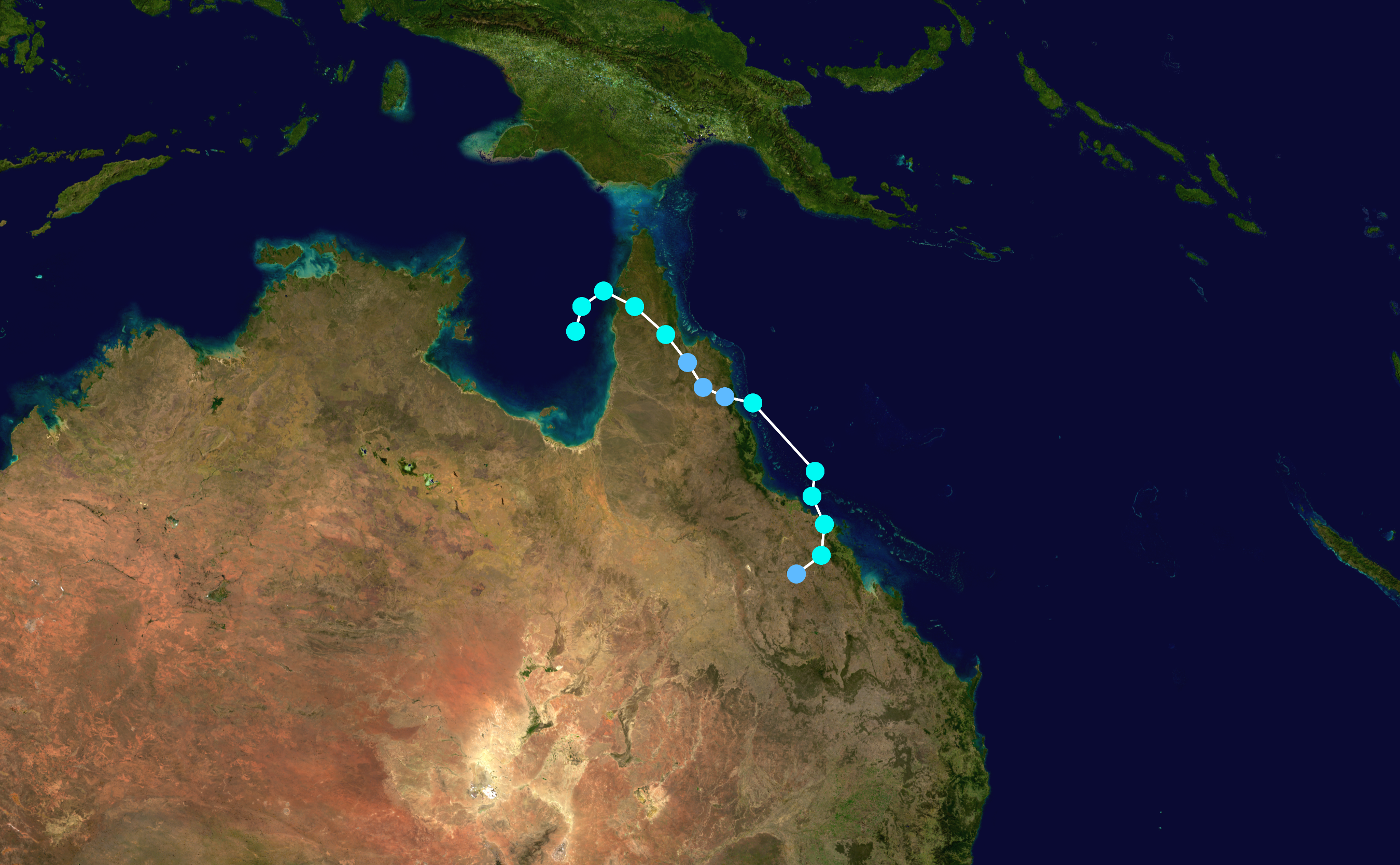
- Duration: 6 March – 10 March
- Peak intensity: 85 km/h (50 mph) (10-min); 984 hPa (mbar)

Otto made landfall near Bowen, Queensland in March 1977. The storm caused minimal wind damage but caused extensive beach erosion.

=== Severe Tropical Cyclone Leo ===
- Category 4 severe tropical cyclone (Australian scale)
- Category 2 tropical cyclone (SSHWS)
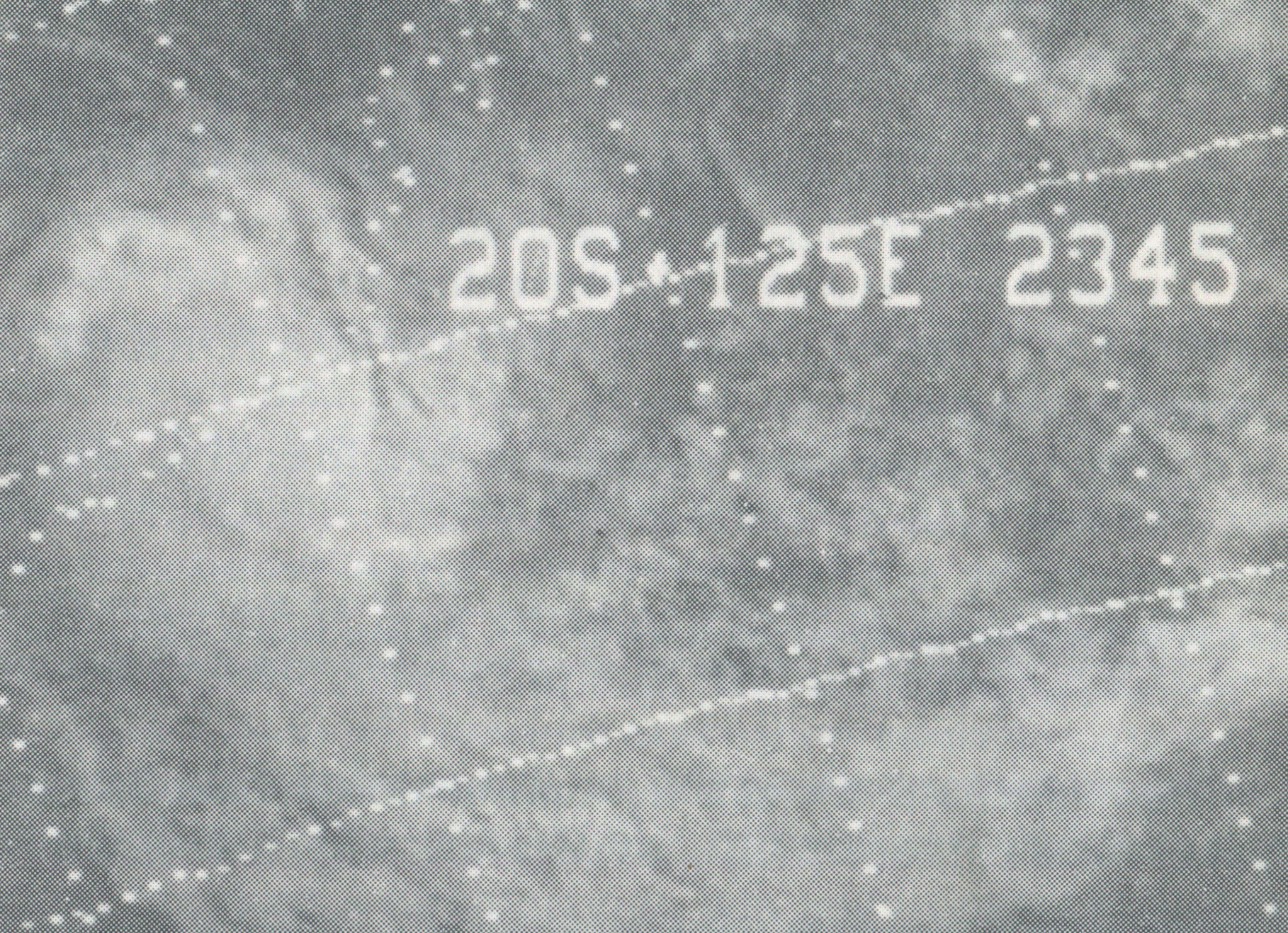
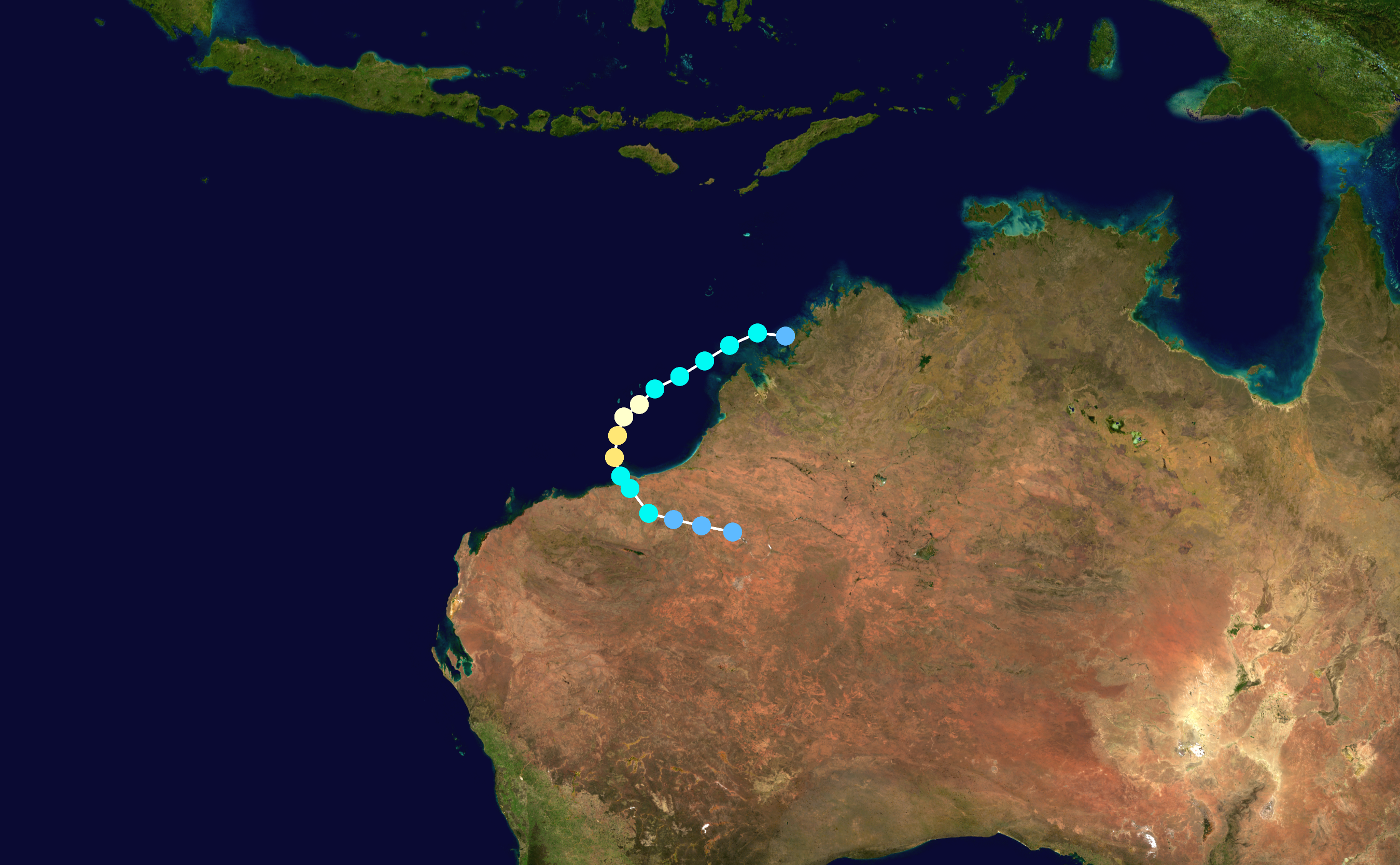
- Duration: 24 March – 28 March
- Peak intensity: 165 km/h (105 mph) (10-min); 955 hPa (mbar)

Leo affected Port Hedland around March 1977.

=== Severe Tropical Cyclone Verna ===
- Category 3 severe tropical cyclone (Australian scale)
- Category 1 tropical cyclone (SSHWS)
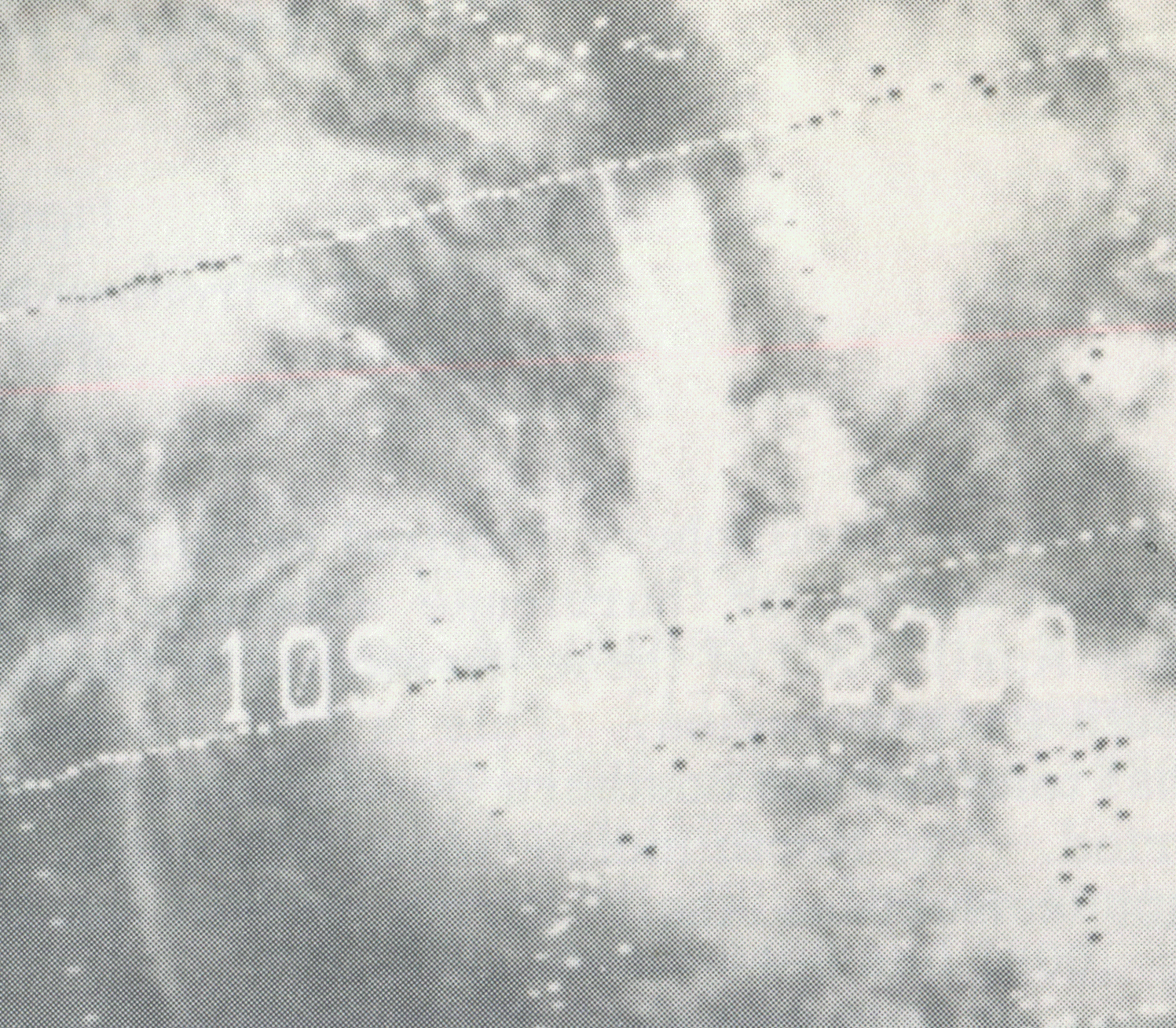
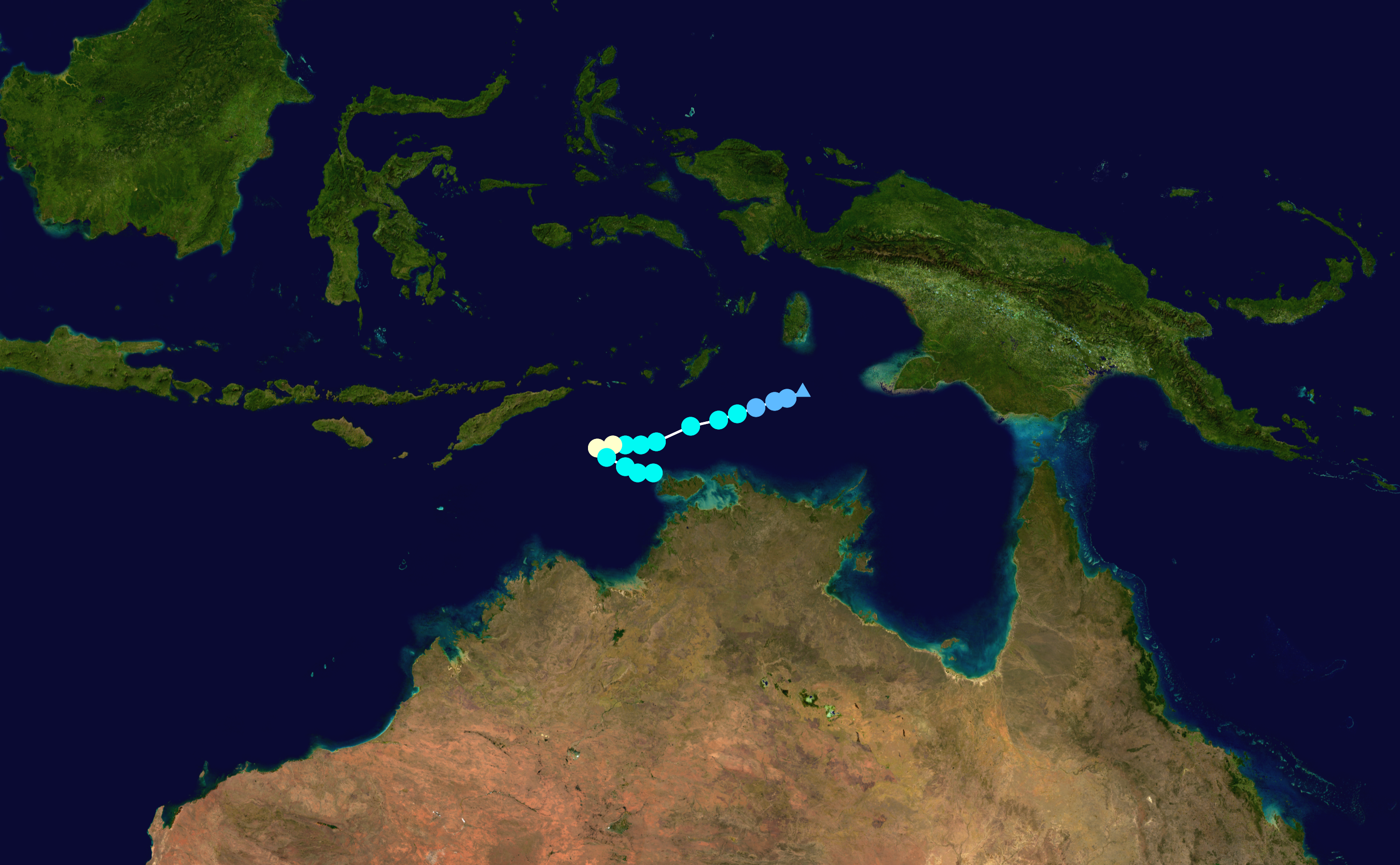
- Duration: 28 April – 3 May
- Peak intensity: 130 km/h (80 mph) (10-min); 973 hPa (mbar)

== See also ==
- Atlantic hurricane seasons: 1976, 1977
- Eastern Pacific hurricane seasons: 1976, 1977
- Western Pacific typhoon seasons: 1976, 1977
- North Indian Ocean cyclone seasons: 1976, 1977
