= Typhoon Chan-hom (2009) =

Pacific typhoon in 2009

Typhoon Chan-hom (Emong)
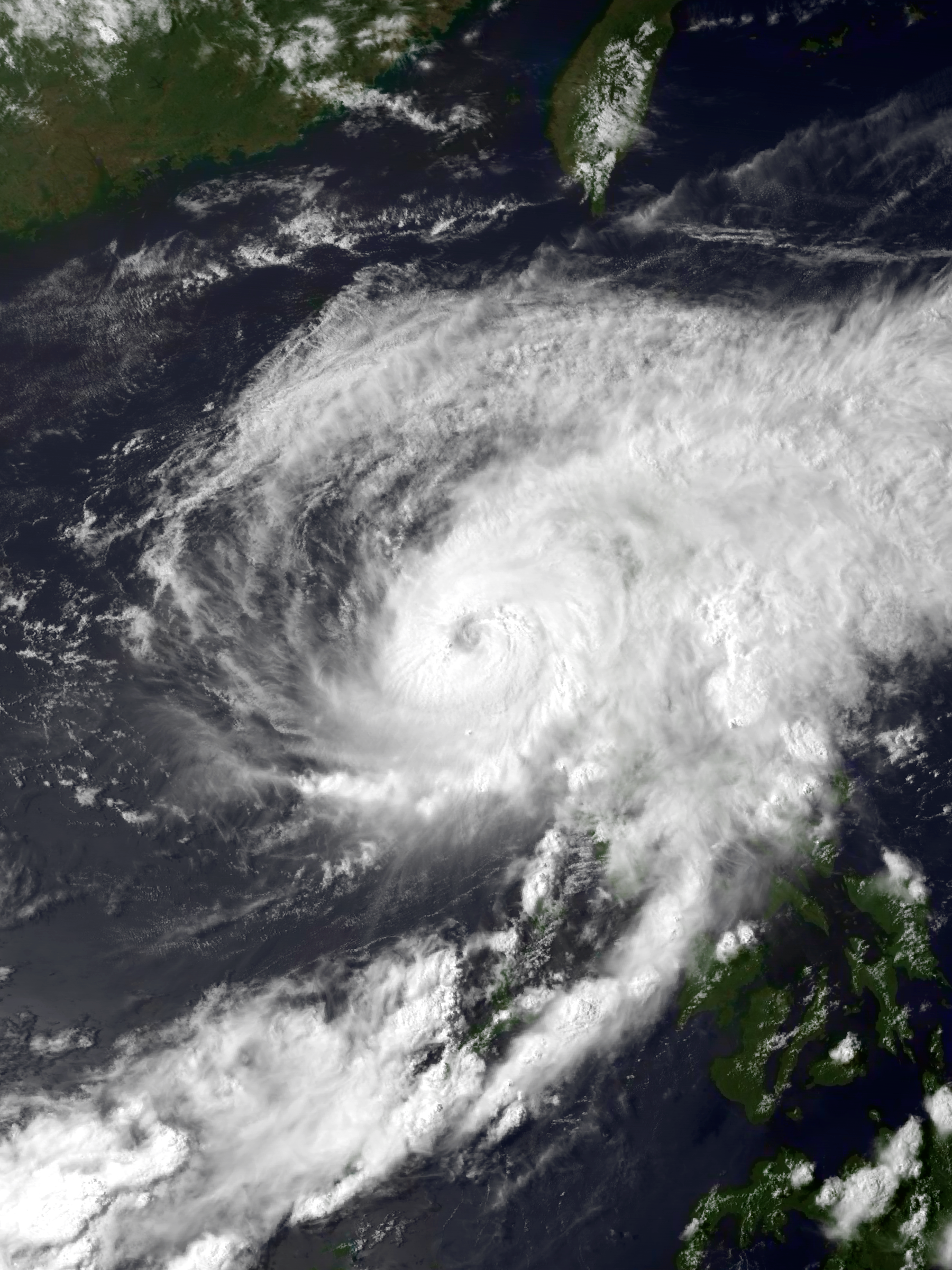
- Typhoon Chan-hom approaching the Philippines at peak intensity on May 7

Meteorological history
- Formed: May 2, 2009
- Extratropical: May 9, 2009
- Dissipated: May 15, 2009

Typhoon
- 10-minute sustained (JMA)
- Highest winds: 120 km/h (75 mph)
- Lowest pressure: 975 hPa (mbar); 28.79 inHg

Category 2-equivalent typhoon
- 1-minute sustained (SSHWS/JTWC)
- Highest winds: 165 km/h (105 mph)
- Lowest pressure: 956 hPa (mbar); 28.23 inHg

Overall effects
- Fatalities: 55 direct, 5 indirect
- Missing: 13
- Damage: $26.1 million (2009 USD)
- Areas affected: Vietnam, Philippines, Ryukyu Islands
- IBTrACS
- Part of the 2009 Pacific typhoon season

Typhoon Chan-hom, (Note: The name Chan-hom (Lao: ຈັນຫອມ, [t͡ɕan˩ hɔːm˩]) was contributed by Laos and refers to a type of fragrant sandalwood (Mansonia gagei) in Lao.) known in the Philippines as Typhoon Emong, was an erratic tropical cyclone that hit the Philippines in early May 2009. The sixth tropical depression and the second tropical storm to develop during the 2009 Pacific typhoon season, Chan-hom developed out of an area of convectional cloudiness associated with an area of disturbed weather which originated from the remnants of Tropical Depression Crising and formed southeast of Nha Trang, Vietnam on May 2. Moving towards the northeast, it slowly organized according to JTWC who issued a TCFA, and JMA classified Chan-hom as a minor tropical depression later that day. The next day, both JTWC and JMA upgraded the depression to a tropical storm and named it Chan-hom. On May 6, the storm intensified into a Category 1 typhoon, and on May 7, Chan-hom intensified into a Category 2 typhoon equivalent. However, Chan-hom weakened into a severe tropical storm after passing northern Luzon. On May 14, Chan-hom regenerated into a tropical depression, before dissipating late on May 15.

== Meteorological history ==
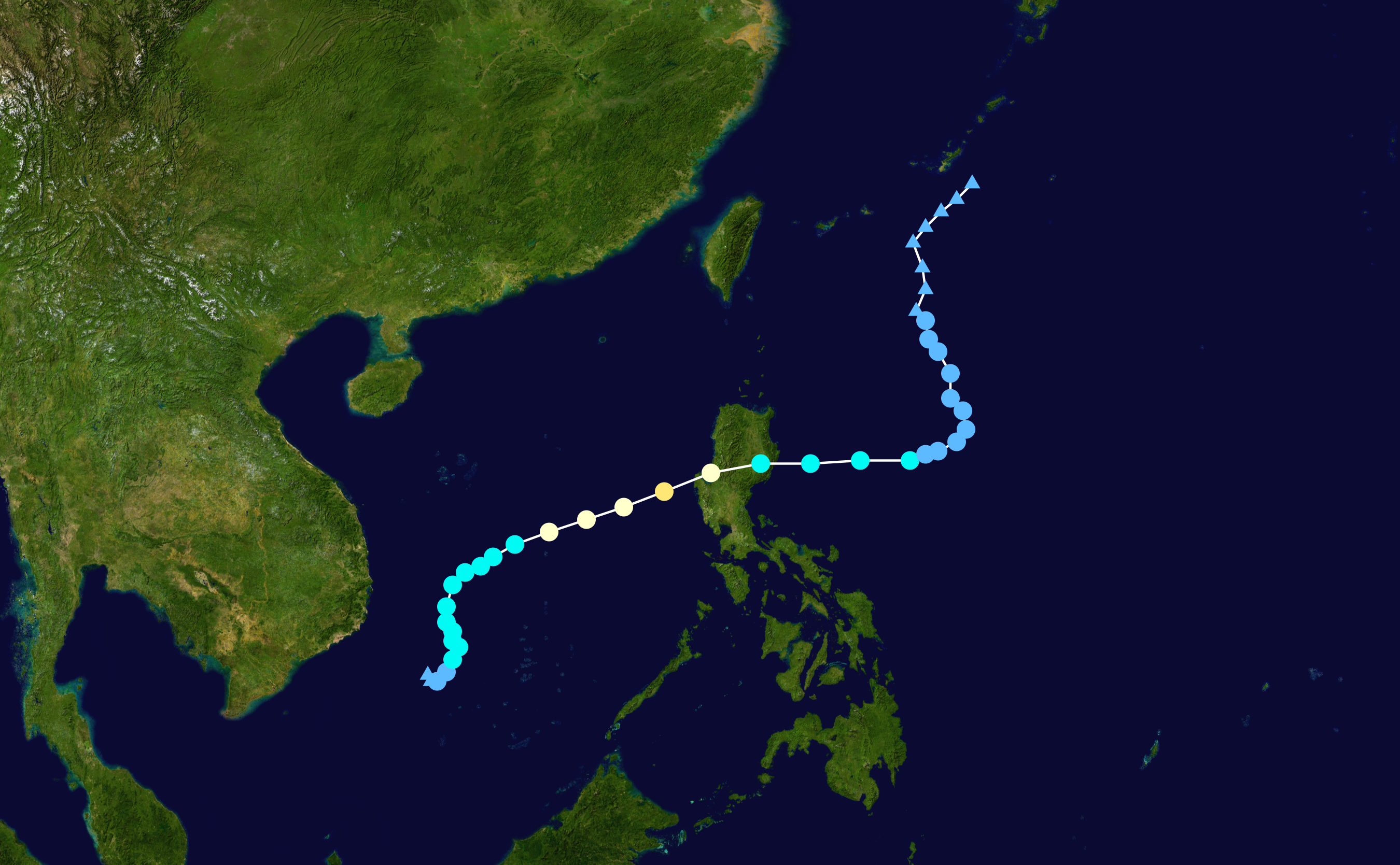
Map plotting the storm's track and intensity, according to the Saffir–Simpson scale Map key Saffir–Simpson scale Tropical depression (≤38 mph, ≤62 km/h) Tropical storm (39–73 mph, 63–118 km/h) Category 1 (74–95 mph, 119–153 km/h) Category 2 (96–110 mph, 154–177 km/h) Category 3 (111–129 mph, 178–208 km/h) Category 4 (130–156 mph, 209–251 km/h) Category 5 (≥157 mph, ≥252 km/h) Unknown Storm type Tropical cyclone Subtropical cyclone Extratropical cyclone, remnant low, tropical disturbance, or monsoon depression

Typhoon Chan-hom was first identified as a disorganized area of low pressure on May 2, 2009 situated roughly 305 km (190 mi) southeast of Nha Trang, Vietnam in the South China Sea. Deep convection was mainly confined to the northern portion of the system; however, a band of cloud cover had begun to wrap around the center of circulation during the afternoon. Later that day, the Japan Meteorological Agency (JMA) began monitoring the developing low as a tropical depression. Hours later, the Joint Typhoon Warning Center (JTWC) issued a Tropical Cyclone Formation Alert for the system as convection consolidated around the center of circulation. Further development was anticipated as the storm slowly moved through an area of warm sea surface temperatures and low wind shear, conditions favoring tropical cyclone formation. Early on May 3, the JTWC classified the system as Tropical Depression 02W. Following the formation of a central dense overcast, both the JTWC and JMA upgraded the depression to a tropical storm, at which time it received the name Chan-hom. Situated to the north of a weak subtropical ridge, little movement was expected over the next two days.

Modest strengthening took place as Chan-hom drifted slowly towards the north before taking a more northeasterly path. By the morning of May 5, the storm developed a symmetrical cloud cover with notable banding features. According to the JMA, maximum sustained winds within the cyclone had reached 95 km/h (59 mph), prompting the agency to upgrade Chan-hom to a severe tropical storm. On May 6, the Philippine Atmospheric, Geophysical and Astronomical Services Administration (PAGASA) began issuing advisories on Chan-hom as it moved into their area of responsibility and assigned it the local Philippine name Emong. Within hours of PAGASA's first advisory, the JTWC assessed Chan-hom to have attained winds of 120 km/h (75 km/h), equivalent to a Category 1 hurricane on the Saffir–Simpson hurricane scale. The JMA followed suit six hours later, classifying the system as a minimal typhoon. Further intensification took place as the typhoon's outflow improved in response to a mid-latitude trough over central China.

Several hours before making landfall along the western coast of Luzon on May 7, an eye began developing. Satellite imagery depicted a depression in the cloud cover over the center of circulation as well as a broken ring of deep convection. In light of this information, the JTWC assessed Chan-hom to have reached its peak intensity at this time, packing sustained winds of 160 km/h (99 mph) and an estimated barometric pressure of 956 mbar (hPa; 28.23 inHg). However, the JMA stated that the typhoon was slightly weaker, having maximum winds of 120 km/h (75 km/h) and a pressure of 975 mbar (hPa; 28.79 inHg). Just prior to crossing the coastline, the storm began to weaken as wind shear increased. Within hours of moving over the mountainous terrain of northern Luzon, the cyclone quickly diminished. The low-level circulation became detached from convection and pressure readings over land indicated a minimum pressure around 1004 mbar (hPa; 29.65 inHg). Although wind shear remained at unfavorably high levels, Chan-hom maintained tropical storm intensity through its crossing of Luzon through the end of May 8.

By May 9, all that remained of Chan-hom was an exposed low-level circulation with convection displaced over 185 km (115 mi) to the east. With the addition of dry air entering the system, the storm was not expected to regain strength as it began to take a northward turn. Around this time, PAGASA issued their final advisory on the system as they assessed it to have degenerated into a non-convective remnant low-pressure system. The JTWC issued their initial final advisory on Chan-hom during that morning; however, later analysis determined that the system remained a tropical depression until the morning of May 11. The JMA and JTWC continued to monitor the remnants of Chan-hom through May 13, at which time its low-level circulation collapsed to the southeast of Okinawa, Japan. However, the remnant low of Chan-hom briefly regenerated into a tropical depression on May 14, before finally dissipating on the next day.

== Preparations ==
=== Vietnam ===
As Chan-hom formed in the South China Sea Vietnamese officials warned 17,793 vessels, with a total of 83,032 fishermen on board the ships, to avoid areas near the tropical storm. Fourteen provinces along the country's coastline were warned by the coast guard about the storm by May 5. All ships that were already at port were prohibited from leaving shore due to high seas up to 7 m (23 ft).

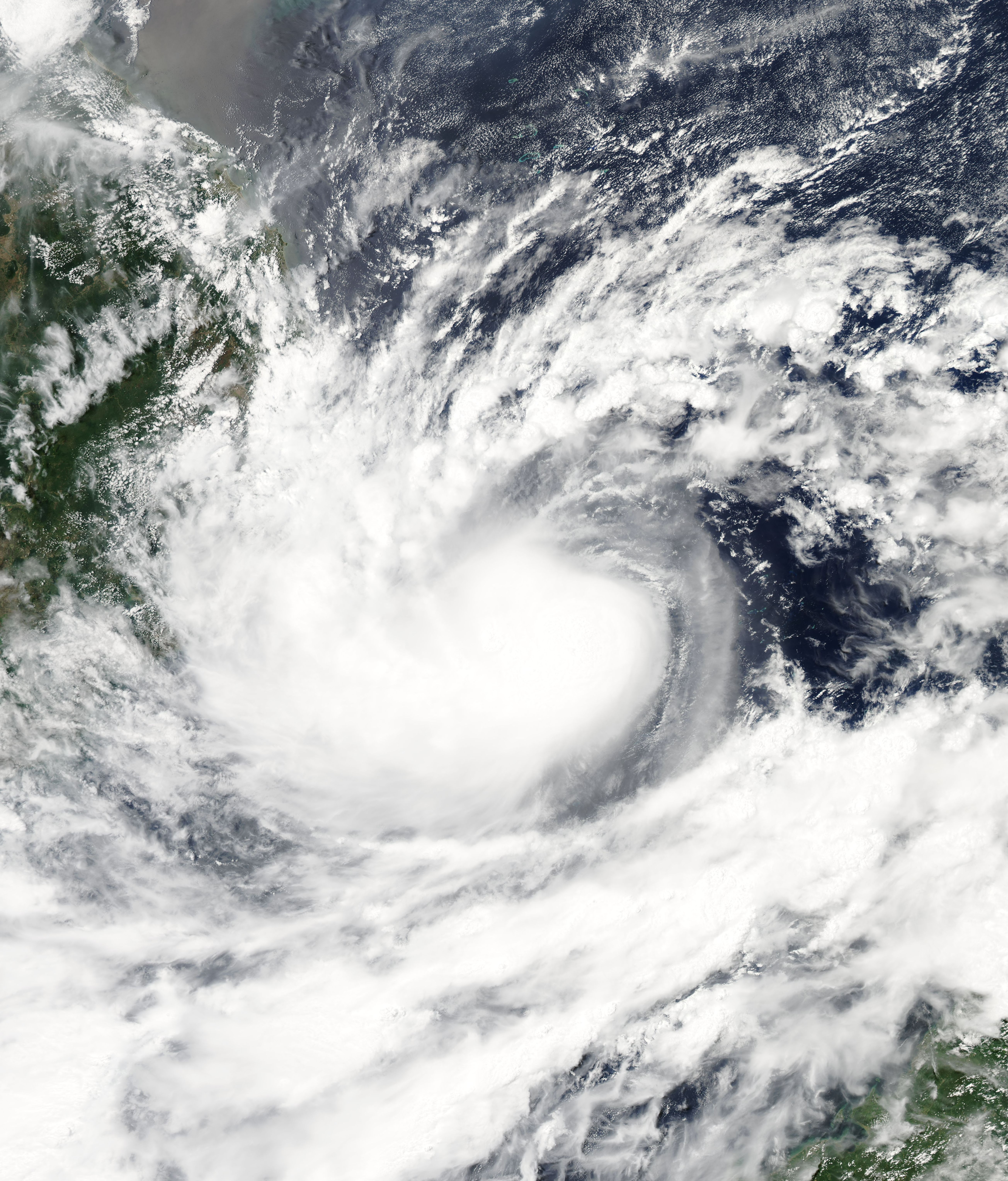
Tropical Storm Chan-Hom off the Vietnam coast on May 4

=== Philippines ===
PAGASA warned residents living in low-lying areas and near mountain slopes to take all necessary precautions against possible flashfloods and landslides. President Arroyo instructed the National Disaster Coordinating Council (NDCC; now National Disaster Risk Reduction and Management Council or NDRRMC) to provide public hourly updates on the entry of typhoon Emong. The Pangasinan Disaster Coordinating Council issued advisories on Pangasinan to be ready for Chan-hom as the storm was continuously moving in the province. PAGASA also warned those living under warning signal no. 2 and 3 to be alert for possible landslides, flash floods and storm surge. These storm signals remained mostly in force over Northern and Central Luzon, where PAGASA forecasted that Emong would make landfall on May 7.

=== Highest public storm warning signal ===
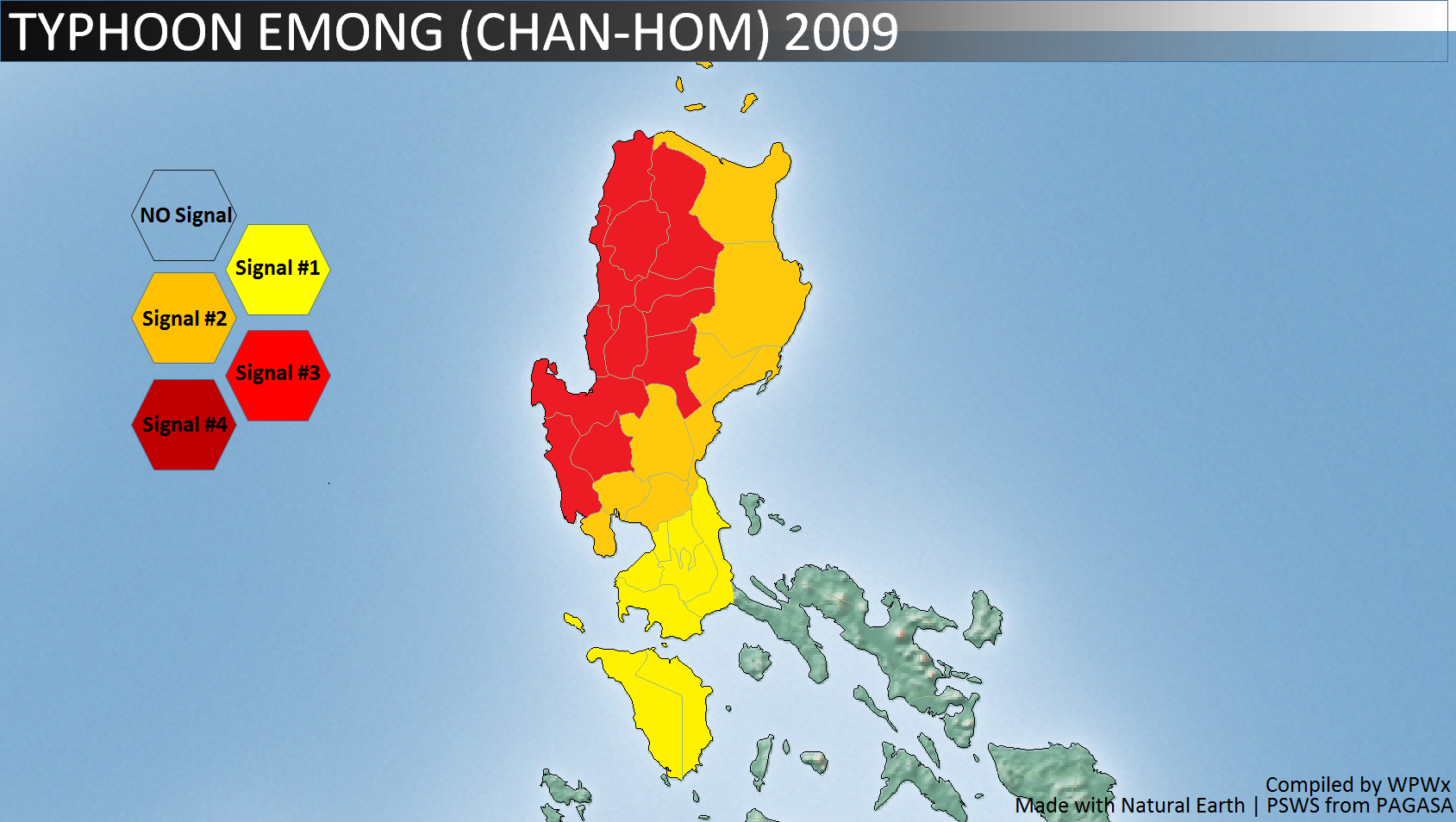
Highest PSWS raised throughout the country as Emong passed Northern Luzon

| PSWS# | Luzon | Visayas | Mindanao |
|---|---|---|---|
| PSWS #3 | Ilocos Norte, Ilocos Sur, La Union, Pangasinan, Zambales, Tarlac, Benguet, Mt. Province, Ifugao, Kalinga, Apayao, Nueva Vizcaya | None | None |
| PSWS #2 | Cagayan, Babuyan Island, Isabela, Quirino, Aurora, Nueva Ecija, Pampanga, Bataan, Bulacan | None | None |
| PSWS #1 | Metro Manila, Rizal, Northern Quezon, Laguna, Cavite, Batangas, Mindoro Provinces, Lubang Is | None | None |

== Impact ==
=== Vietnam ===
As of May 7, no known structural impact was caused by Chan-hom in Vietnam. A fishing boat from Lý Sơn Island, Quảng Ngãi was capsized near the Paracel Islands, and all 11 fishermen were rescued by Chinese Navy.

=== Philippines ===
A 48-hour rainfall was recorded throughout Luzon from May 6 to 8 peaking on May 7. Winds of 85–140 km/h combined with heavy rain damaged the provinces of Abra, Quirino, Cagayan, Apayao, Ilocos Norte, Aurora (further, these provinces received more than 200mm in 24 hours.) and Zambales (received more than 135 mm in 24 hours). Rain was also heavy over Pampanga (receiving 145 mm), Nueva Ecija, Tarlac, Bulacan, Bataan, Metro Manila and parts of southern Luzon. Moderate rain was also experienced over Quezon province and Bicol Region. (Cagayan and Isabela are not specified but are also flooded which can mean it may have experienced more than 50 mm of rain. Moreover, Cagayan River flooded). As of May 10, about 65,000 people were left homeless in Ilocos Region and in Cordillera region.

In Bataan, the flood was up to the waistline. Some residents were also evacuated. As of May 8, at least 25 people were confirmed to have been killed by flooding and mudslides produced by Emong. Chan-hom further affected 4,000 people, caused 11 landslides, cost PHP863,528 worth of crops in 55 hectares of land in Zambales and PHP4.4 million worth of transmission lines in Pangasinan.

On May 9, the number of fatalities increased to 26. Western Pangasinan was put under a state of calamity, with the whole province registering at least 16 deaths. Deaths included those who drowned, buried under their collapsed homes and got hit by flying debris. In the town of Anda in Pangasinan, 90 percent of houses had their roofs blown away, with mango trees uprooted and cultured fishes washed away to the sea. In Ifugao, at least 10 deaths were blamed on landslides, while the bridges linking Lamut and Bagabag, Nueva Vizcaya collapsed. In Isabela, "all work animals" in San Mateo drowned when the town river overflowed.

The National Disaster Coordinating Council (NDCC) damage report update on 6:00 pm May 19 put dead at 60, injured at 53 and missing at 13 and damage worth 1,280,897,383 pesos of which 750,403,562 were in agriculture and 530,493,821 in infrastructure. It further affected 385,833 persons living in 615 barangays of 59 municipalities and 7 cities of 12 provinces of Region I (La Union and Pangasinan), Region II (Nueva Vizcaya, Isabela, Quirino and Cagayan), Region III (Zambales and Pampanga) and Cordillera Administrative Region (Ifugao, Kalinga, Mountain Province and Benguet) as well as damaged 56,160 houses of which 23,444 are totally destroyed and 32,716 partially damaged, and induced 11 landslides in Zambales and Ifugao.

Emong (Chan-hom) directly passed through these provinces: Pangasinan, La Union, Ilocos Sur, Benguet, Nueva Vizcaya, Ifugao, Mountain Province, Kalinga and Isabela.

== Aftermath ==
=== Philippines ===
As of May 10, roughly 2.3 million Philippine pesos (US$48,000) in relief expenses had been used. The National Disaster Coordinating Council (NDCC) supplied 1,250 sacks of rice to the affected areas. The Department of Social Welfare and Development reported that PHP 2.7 million (US$57,000) worth of relief supplies was stockpiled and ready for distribution. The Armed Forces of the Philippines deployed several teams to assist with recovery efforts and debris removal. On May 8, two UH-1 Iroquois helicopters were provided to conduct aerial surveys of the damage in Isabela, Ifugao and Aurora Provinces.

== See also ==
- Other tropical cyclones named Chan-hom
- Other tropical cyclones named Emong
- Effects of the 2009 Pacific typhoon season in the Philippines
- Tropical cyclones in 2009
- Typhoon Vicki (1998)
- Tropical Storm Linfa (2003)
- Tropical Storm Halong (2008)
- Tropical Storm Co-May (2025) – The next and strongest storm to strike Pangasinan since this storm; it also had the same Philippine name and led to name retirement.
