= List of storms named Lekima =

The name Lekima (Vietnamese: lêkima, [le˧˧ ki˧˧ maː˧˧]) has been used for four tropical cyclones in the western North Pacific Ocean. The name was contributed by Vietnam and means lucuma (Pouteria lucuma) in Vietnamese.

- Typhoon Lekima (2001) (T0119, 23W, Labuyo) – struck Taiwan and China
- Severe Tropical Storm Lekima (2007) (T0714, 16W, Hanna) – brought heavy rains to Luzon and struck Vietnam
- Typhoon Lekima (2013) (T1328, 28W) – the second strongest 2013 storm worldwide
- Typhoon Lekima (2019) (T1909, 10W, Hanna) – brought heavy rains and flooding to Luzon due to its enhancement of the southwest monsoon, later intensifying into the season's second super typhoon, and made landfall in China. It also happened to be the 2nd time carrying the given Philippine local name for the storm.

The name Lekima was retired following the 2019 Pacific typhoon season and was replaced with Co-May (Vietnamese: cỏ may, [kɔ˧˩ maj˧˧]), which means a type of grass (Chrysopogon aciculatus) in Vietnamese.

- Severe Tropical Storm Co-May (T2508, 11W, Emong) – strongest storm to strike Pangasinan since 2009, as well as affected parts of Taiwan and China.

The name Co-May was retired following the 2025 Pacific typhoon season and a replacement name will be given at the 59th WMO/Typhoon Committee Annual Session in spring 2027.
