= Typhoon Vicki =

Pacific typhoon in 1998

Typhoon Vicki (Gading)
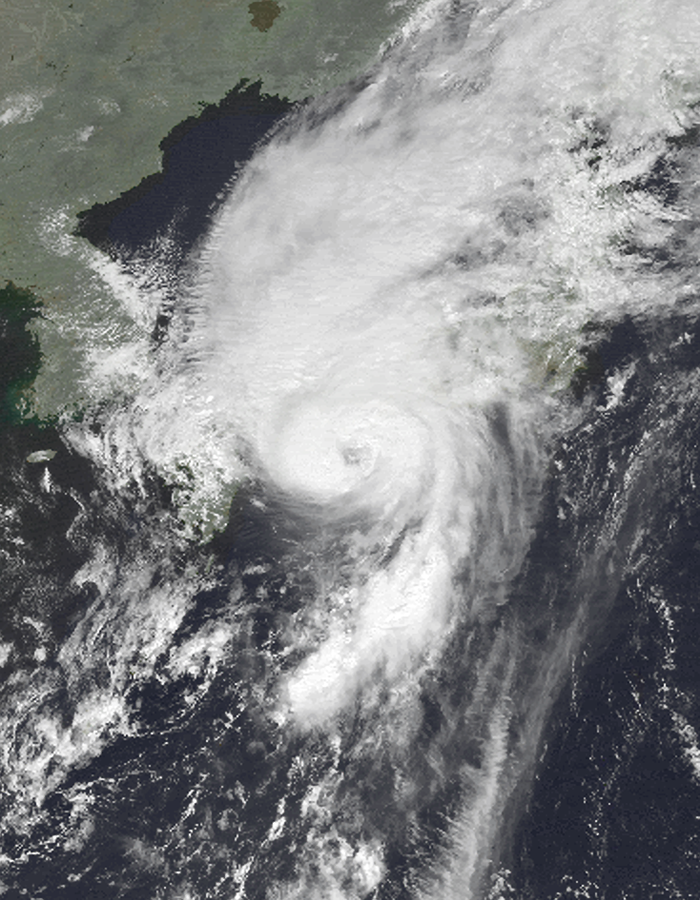
- Typhoon Vicki on September 22, 1998

Meteorological history
- Formed: September 17, 1998
- Dissipated: September 22, 1998

Typhoon
- 10-minute sustained (JMA)
- Highest winds: 140 km/h (85 mph)
- Lowest pressure: 960 hPa (mbar); 28.35 inHg

Category 2-equivalent typhoon
- 1-minute sustained (SSHWS/JTWC)
- Highest winds: 165 km/h (105 mph)
- Lowest pressure: 954 hPa (mbar); 28.17 inHg

Overall effects
- Fatalities: 108 total
- Missing: 10
- Damage: $1.22 billion (1998 USD)
- Areas affected: Philippines, Japan
- IBTrACS
- Part of the 1998 Pacific typhoon season

Typhoon Vicki, known in the Philippines as Typhoon Gading, was a moderately strong typhoon that was notable for having a rather unusual eastward-northeastward track through the Philippines and Japan. The eleventh tropical depression, seventh named tropical storm and fourth typhoon of the inactive 1998 Pacific typhoon season, Vicki originated from an area of disturbed weather in the South China Sea.

== Meteorological history ==
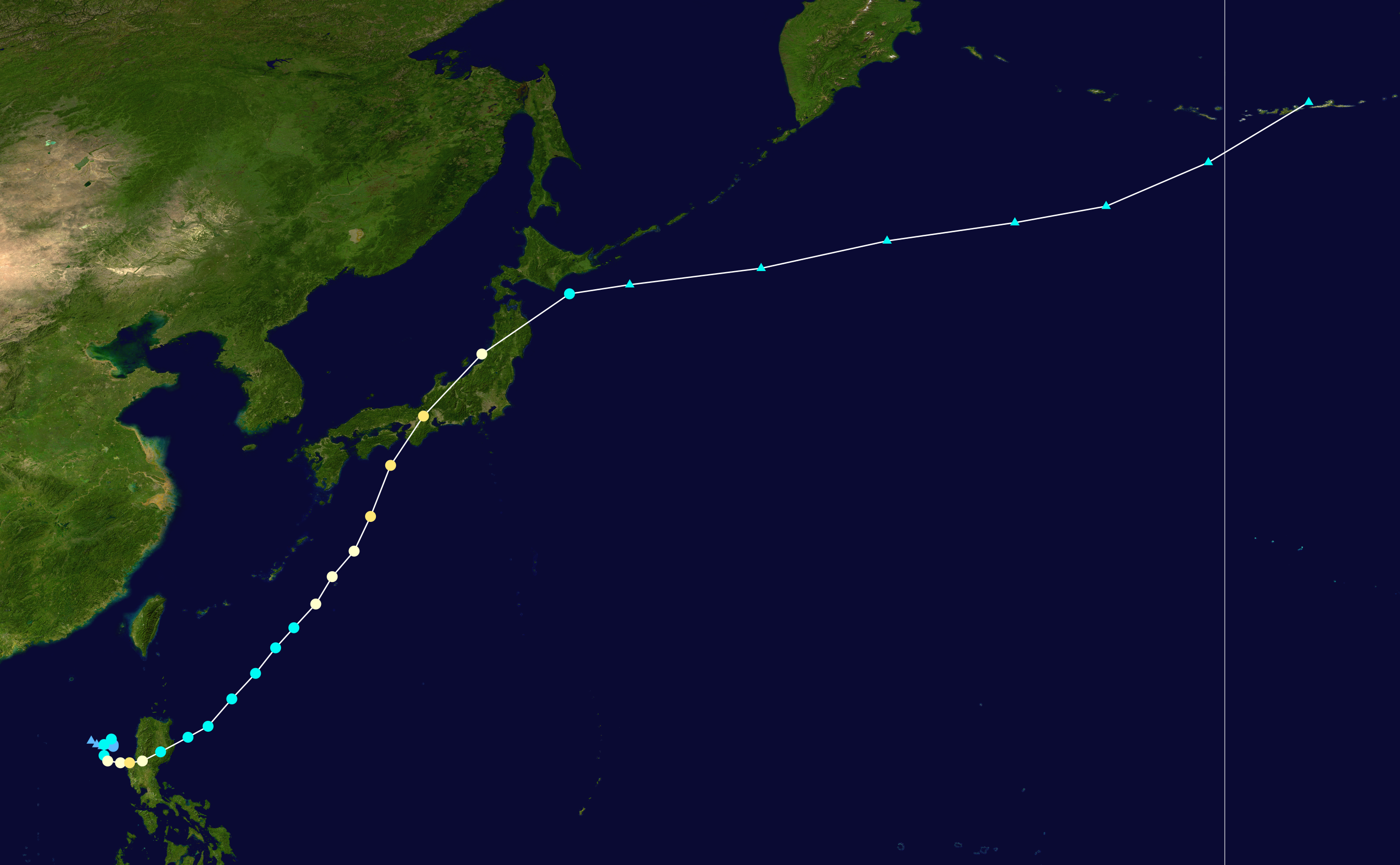
Map plotting the storm's track and intensity, according to the Saffir–Simpson scale Map key Saffir–Simpson scale Tropical depression (≤38 mph, ≤62 km/h) Tropical storm (39–73 mph, 63–118 km/h) Category 1 (74–95 mph, 119–153 km/h) Category 2 (96–110 mph, 154–177 km/h) Category 3 (111–129 mph, 178–208 km/h) Category 4 (130–156 mph, 209–251 km/h) Category 5 (≥157 mph, ≥252 km/h) Unknown Storm type Tropical cyclone Subtropical cyclone Extratropical cyclone, remnant low, tropical disturbance, or monsoon depression

On September 17, a tropical disturbance formed at South China Sea west of Luzon. It intensified quickly and was named Vicki, eventually attaining typhoon status a day after it formed. Unusual for a Pacific typhoon, the system moved eastward and crossed Luzon on September 18, bringing squally conditions to most parts of the island. After that, Vicki then moved northeast, and eventually made landfall on September 22 at the Kii Peninsula in Japan.

== Impact ==
In all, 108 people were killed and 10 others were listed as missing.

=== Philippines ===
The 100 mph (160 km/h) Typhoon Vicki, while moving eastward through northern Luzon, dropped torrential rainfall, killing 9 people and affecting more than 300,000 people. The ferry MV Princess of the Orient foundered and sank during the storm's onslaught, killing 70 and leaving 80 others missing and presumed dead. The ferry sank near Fortune Island in the Verde Island Passage. The typhoon also destroyed a transmitter which belonged to DWDW 1017; the destruction of the transmitter also signified the end of its broadcasting.

=== Japan ===
Vicki continued northeastward and hit southern Japan killing two women in Nara prefecture, damaging Kasuga Grand Shrine in Nara city and the five-storied pagoda at Muro temple, disrupting train and passenger service and cancelling over 60 domestic flights in the country. Insurance claims nationwide reached ¥159.9 billion (US$1.22 billion).

== See also ==
- Tropical cyclones in 1998
- Tropical Storm Linfa (2003) – a strong tropical storm that nearly replicated Vicki's path 5 years later
- Tropical Storm Halong (2008) – another relatively strong storm which also took a similar trajectory to Vicki ten years later
- Typhoon Chan-hom (2009) – a typhoon that also moved eastward and made landfall in northern Luzon
- Typhoon Co-May (2025) - a similar typhoon that also took the same areas in northern Luzon
