= List of storms named Linfa =

The name Linfa (Cantonese: 蓮花, [liːn˨˩ faː˥]) has been used for four tropical cyclones in the western North Pacific Ocean. The name was contributed by Macau and means sacred lotus (Nelumbo nucifera) in Cantonese.

- Severe Tropical Storm Linfa (2003) (T0304, 05W, Chedeng) – struck Japan.
- Severe Tropical Storm Linfa (2009) (T0903, 03W) – made landfall in Fujian.
- Severe Tropical Storm Linfa (2015) (T1510, 10W, Egay) – caused severe flooding throughout most of the Philippines.
- Tropical Storm Linfa (2020) (T2015, 17W) - contributed to a series of devastating floods in Vietnam, killing over 120 people.

The name Linfa was retired following the 2020 Pacific typhoon season and was replaced with Peilou (Cantonese: 琵鷺, [pʰei˨˩ lou˨]), which means spoonbill in Cantonese.

- Tropical Storm Peilou (2026) (T2616, 13W) - a tropical storm that stayed in the Pacific Ocean.

== See also ==
- List of storms named In-fa, similar tropical cyclone name also used in the Western Pacific Ocean
- List of storms named Linda, similar tropical cyclone name also used in the Australian region, and the Eastern and Western Pacific Ocean basins
