= Tropical Storm Linfa (2009) =

Pacific severe tropical storm in 2009

Severe Tropical Storm Linfa
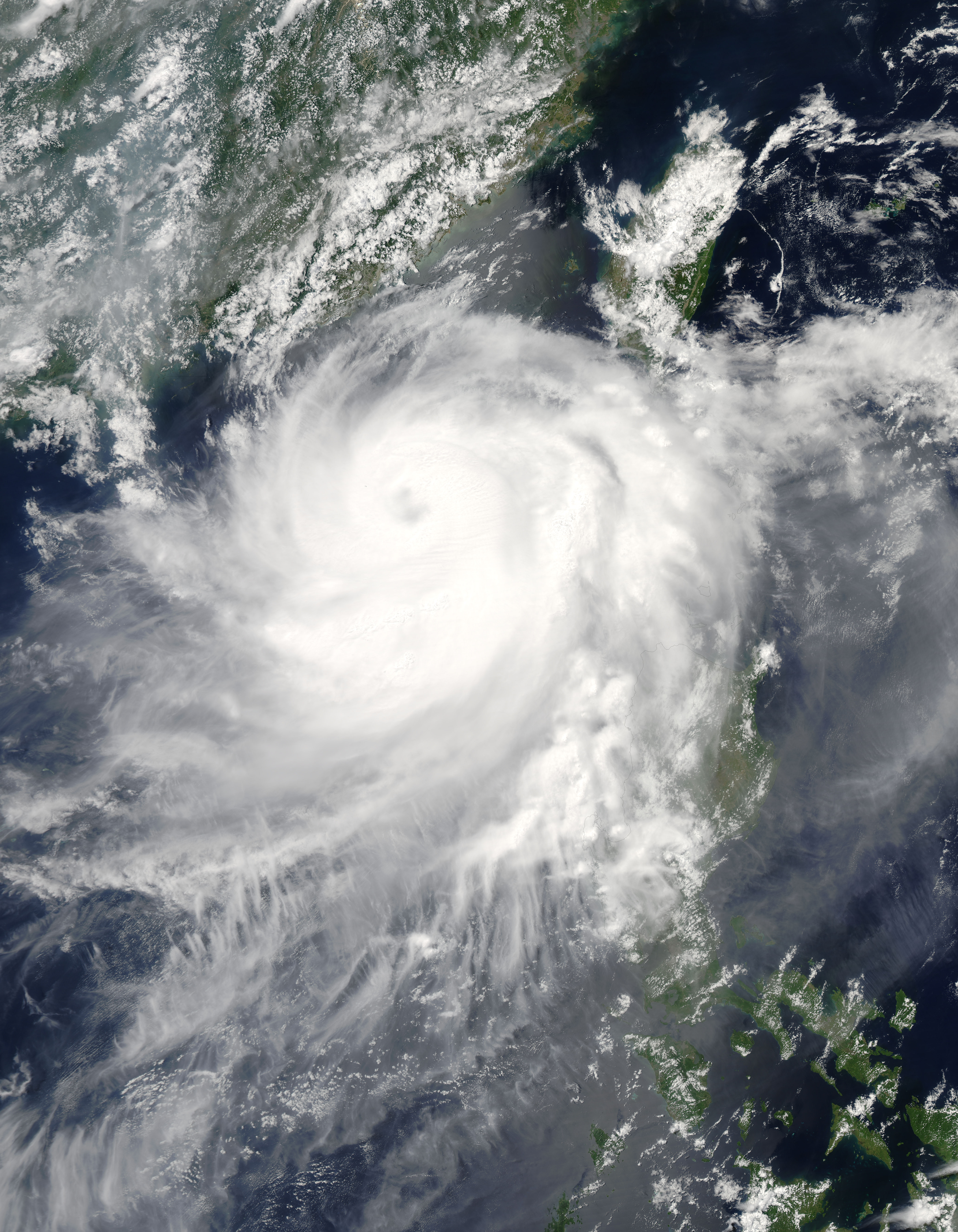
- Severe Tropical Storm Linfa near peak intensity on June 20

Meteorological history
- Formed: June 14, 2009
- Extratropical: June 22, 2009
- Dissipated: June 29, 2009

Severe tropical storm
- 10-minute sustained (JMA)
- Highest winds: 110 km/h (70 mph)
- Lowest pressure: 975 hPa (mbar); 28.79 inHg

Category 1-equivalent typhoon
- 1-minute sustained (SSHWS/JTWC)
- Highest winds: 140 km/h (85 mph)
- Lowest pressure: 967 hPa (mbar); 28.56 inHg

Overall effects
- Fatalities: 7 direct
- Missing: 6
- Damage: $105 million (2009 USD)
- Areas affected: Philippines, Taiwan, China, Japan, Russia
- IBTrACS
- Part of the 2009 Pacific typhoon season

Severe Tropical Storm Linfa (Note: The name Linfa (Cantonese: 蓮花, [liːn˨˩ faː˥]) was contributed by Macau and means lotus (Nelumbo nucifera) in Cantonese.) was the second named storm to develop in the South China Sea during the 2009 Pacific typhoon season. It is the seventh depression and third typhoon of the season. Forming out of an area of low pressure on June 14, the storm briefly attained tropical depression status before degenerating. By June 17 the system regenerated in the South China Sea. Slowly tracking northward, the storm intensified, attaining severe tropical storm status on June 19 and peaking in intensity the following day. On June 21, Linfa made landfall in Fujian Province, China as a tropical storm before weakening to a tropical depression.

In Taiwan, outer bands of the storm produced significant amounts of rain over southeastern areas of the island. Along the western coast, rip currents resulted in the drowning of one person. Six hikers also were reported to be missing. In China, torrential rains triggered flooding that destroyed 100 homes, killed one person and left six others missing. In all, seven people were killed by Linfa, with damages in mainland China estimated at ¥641 million (US$93.8 million) and agricultural losses in Taiwan reached NT$400 million (US$12.1 million).

== Meteorological history ==
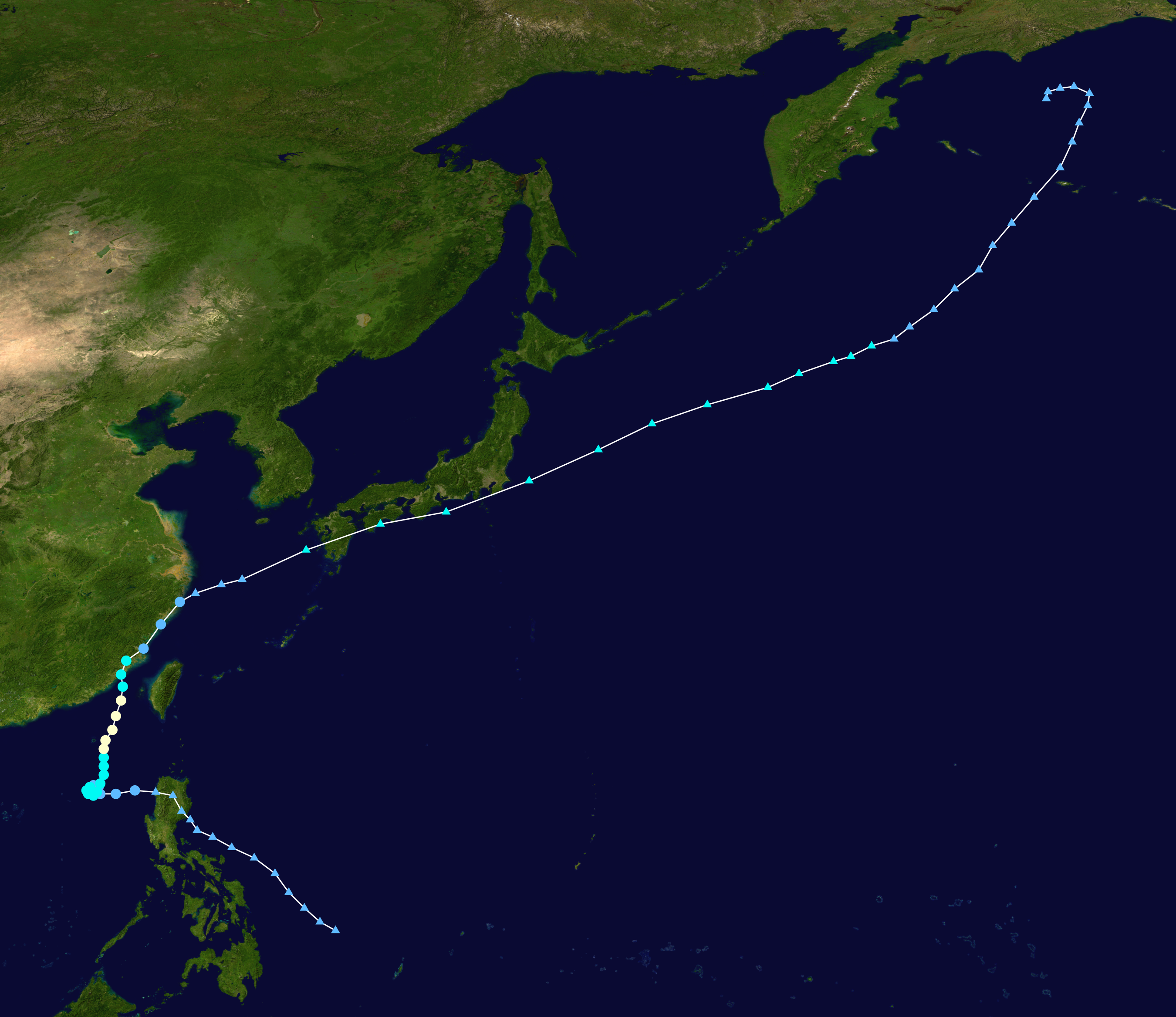
Map plotting the storm's track and intensity, according to the Saffir–Simpson scale Map key Saffir–Simpson scale Tropical depression (≤38 mph, ≤62 km/h) Tropical storm (39–73 mph, 63–118 km/h) Category 1 (74–95 mph, 119–153 km/h) Category 2 (96–110 mph, 154–177 km/h) Category 3 (111–129 mph, 178–208 km/h) Category 4 (130–156 mph, 209–251 km/h) Category 5 (≥157 mph, ≥252 km/h) Unknown Storm type Tropical cyclone Subtropical cyclone Extratropical cyclone, remnant low, tropical disturbance, or monsoon depression

On June 10, the Joint Typhoon Warning Center (JTWC) began monitoring a persistent area of convection situated about 140 kilometres (85 mi) southeast of Palau. Satellite imagery depicted an elongated low-level circulation with deep convection centered along the southwestern portion of the system. Strong wind shear, which normally inhibits cyclonic development, provided energy for further convective development around the system. Tracking in a general northwestward direction, the low gradually developed northward outflow due to a tropical upper tropospheric trough (TUTT) located north of the disturbance. Following further development, the Japan Meteorological Agency declared the system as a tropical depression at 0600 UTC on June 14.

Later on June 14, the JTWC issued a Tropical Cyclone Formation Alert (TCFA) for the depression. Deep convection consolidated around the center of circulation and convective banding features developed along the periphery of the system. Several hours later, the TCFA was canceled as the system rapidly degenerated, with convection mostly dissipating and an exposed low. Outflow significantly deteriorated as the system detached itself from the TUTT. By this time, the JMA had ceased advisories on the depression. Two days later, after tracking across Luzon, the system began to regenerate. Convection redeveloped around the low and outflow was reestablished to the south.

Early on June 17, the JTWC issued a second TCFA as the system continued to organize. By this time the system was nearly stationary and at 0600 UTC, the JMA declared that the low had developed into a tropical depression. Several hours later, the JTWC designated the system as Tropical Depression 03W while the storm was situated about 705 km (440 mi) south-southwest of Kaohsiung, Taiwan. Little movement took place for the first few days of the storm's existence as weak steering currents were in place over the South China Sea. Following further development of the depression, the JTWC upgraded it to a tropical storm late on June 17. At 0600 UTC on June 18, the JMA classified the system as a tropical storm and gave it the name Linfa. Limited poleward outflow hindered intensification for the remainder of June 18. By this time, the storm began to increase in forward motion due to a strengthening subtropical ridge located east of Taiwan and a mid-latitude trough to the west.

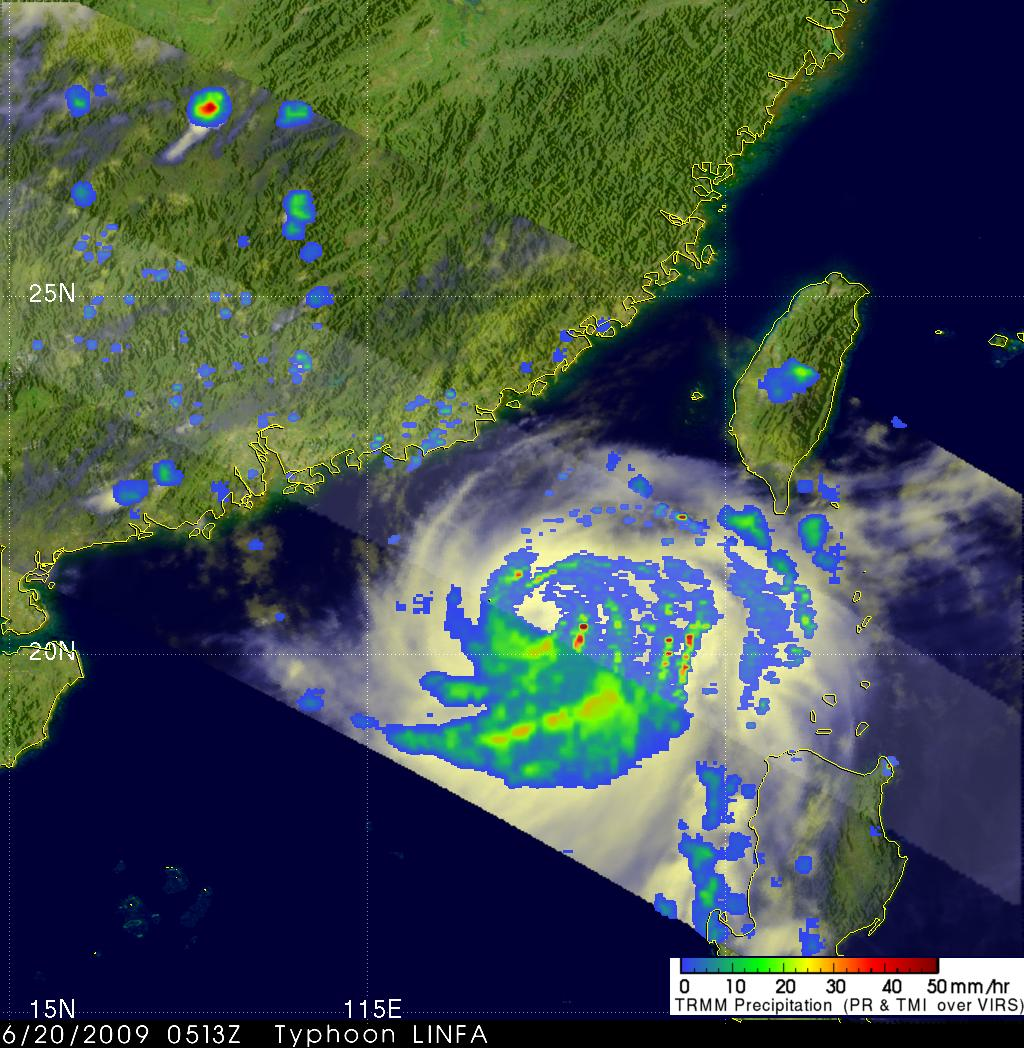
TRMM image of Severe Tropical Storm Linfa on June 20

Around 1200 UTC the following day, Linfa further intensified into a severe tropical storm. A microwave satellite image of the storm depicted an eye-feature surrounded by deep convection. Interacting with a nearby upper-level low, poleward outflow significantly improved late on June 19, fueling further strengthening. Slowly tracking in a general northward direction, Linfa continued to organize and by June 20, the JTWC upgraded Linfa to a typhoon. A small, ragged eye appeared on visible satellite images by this time and several hours later, the storm reached its peak intensity just below typhoon-status according to the JMA. Maximum sustained winds peaked at 110 km/h (70 mph 10-minute winds) and a barometric pressure of 975 hPa (mbar).

Later on June 20, convection near the center of circulation began to decrease–an indication of weakening–and the eye was no longer visible. Upper-level wind shear rapidly increased to 55 km/h (35 mph), preventing re-intensification of the cyclone. Taking a more northward track than anticipated, Linfa began to interact with land and was downgraded to a tropical storm by the JTWC on June 21. Around 1230 UTC, the storm made landfall in southern Fujian as a tropical storm with winds of 85 km/h (50 mph 10-minute winds). Deep convection rapidly dissipated shortly thereafter due to interaction with land. Several hours later, the JTWC downgraded Linfa to a tropical depression. The following day, the JMA also downgraded Linfa to a tropical depression as the storm moved away from the Chinese coastline. The system later dissipated just offshore; a circulation was no longer evident on satellite imagery.

== Preparations and impact ==
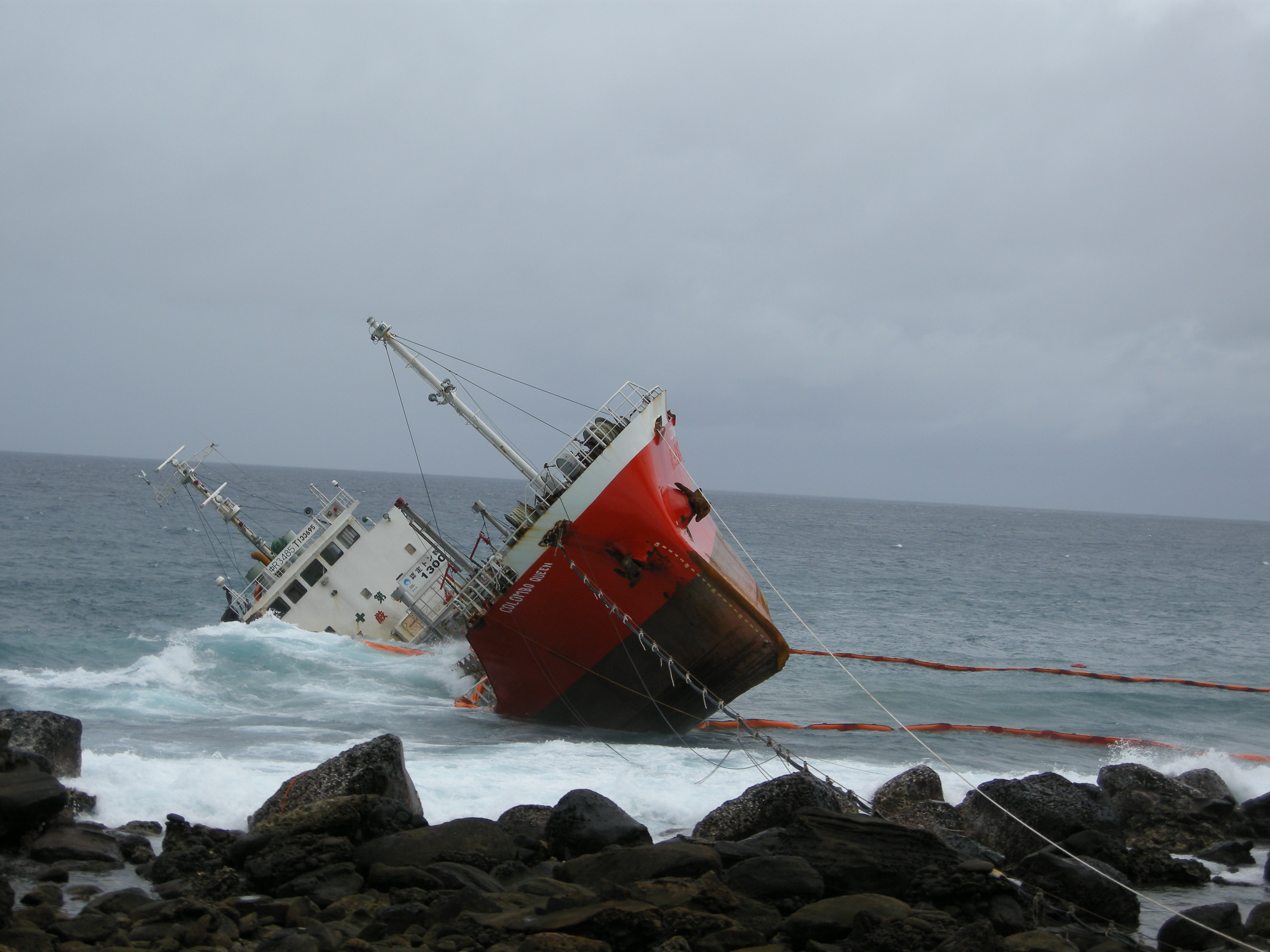
The Colombo Queen run aground by Tropical Storm Linfa

Although Linfa was not forecast to directly impact the Philippines, the outer effects of the storm were anticipated to produce increased rainfall and large swells along western facing coastlines. By June 20, the Central Weather Bureau issued extremely heavy rain warnings, indicating 24-hour rainfall totals in excess of 130 mm (5.1 in) were anticipated, for most of Taiwan. Beaches throughout Taiwan were closed due to rough seas and local officials inspected all public shelters to ensure they were stocked and prepared to provide for evacuees. Later that day, a level 3 emergency was declared for eastern Guangdong Province and southern Fujian Province. The local governments in the provinces enacted their emergency response plans following this declaration.

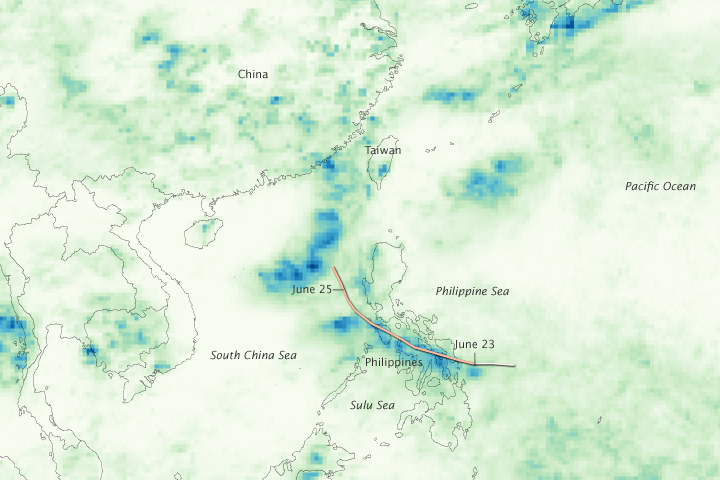
Rainfall in the vicinity of the South China Sea between June 18 and June 25, 2009. The greatest amounts of rainfall appear in deep blue.

On June 21, officials in China closed Xiamen port and stated that it would resume operations once the storm passed. Later that day 33,000 vessels sought refuge at port. Following the issuance of a land warning, government offices and schools were closed throughout the island. Officials sent 10 million text messages to residents throughout Fujian Province to warn them about the approaching storm. In Hong Kong, public warning signal number one was raised for nearly 24 hours as Linfa briefly threatened the city on June 20. Officials also evacuated roughly 160,000 people from coastal areas in Fujian. A total of 167 flights to and from Taiwan were canceled or delayed due to the storm.

On June 21, large swells of up to 5.6 m (18 ft) caused a 498-tonne oil tanker, the Colombo Queen, to run aground in southern Taiwan. Rescue crews were unable to reach the ship as it was still in the storm. Although no fuel was reported to have leaked, the ship struck a coral reef, damaging the coral. Once Linfa passed, rescuers were able to reach the nine crew members on the ship. Officials estimated that it would take over a week to remove all 39,000 litres (8,600 imp gal; 10,000 US gal) of fuel from the tanker. In Taiwan, two people were hit by fallen trees and two monks were struck by a wall that collapsed during a ceremony. Rip currents in Taiwan resulted in one death after a boy went into the water unwatched. Six hikers also went missing. Power to all 505 residences of Chiangchun was also lost during the storm. Average amounts of 150 mm (5.9 in) of rain were recorded across southeastern parts of Taiwan on June 21. The highest total was 350 mm (14 in) in Taitung. Further rainfall of 150 mm (5.9 in) fell on June 22, pushing totals over 450 mm (18 in) in isolated areas along southeastern areas. In Kinmen County, 50 trees were downed, six billboards were destroyed and two homes lost their roofs. By June 22, power companies reported that 2,834 residents had lost power in Wuqiu Township for several hours. Severe damage was reported in the agricultural sector in Taiwan, leaving NT$400 million (US$12.1 million) in losses.

In mainland China, Linfa produced torrential rains, peaking at 488.1 mm (19.22 in) and triggering severe flooding. Heavy rains also impacted Hong Kong, where more than 100 mm (3.9 in) fell over a three-day span. Following a landslide, one person was killed. Flood waters destroyed 100 homes and inundated 10,000 others as well as an estimated 32,000 hectares of farmland in Fujian Province. In Taoyuan Town, a total of 191 mm (7.5 in) of rain fell within one hour, breaking a 200-year-old record in the town. In Meizhou, Guongdong Province, flash flooding resulted in five additional fatalities after 413.7 mm (16.29 in) of rain fell within a nine-hour span. This rainfall was higher than any recorded amount in the past 100 years in the region. A total of 362 homes were destroyed in the town and infrastructure was severely damaged. Additionally, an estimated 20 million people were affected by the storm. Damages from Linfa in China amounted to ¥641 million ($93.8 million).

== See also ==
- Other tropical cyclones named Linfa
- Typhoons in the Philippines
- Tropical Storm Hagibis (2014)
