= Tropical Storm Co-May =

Pacific severe tropical storm in 2025

Severe Tropical Storm Co-May (Emong)
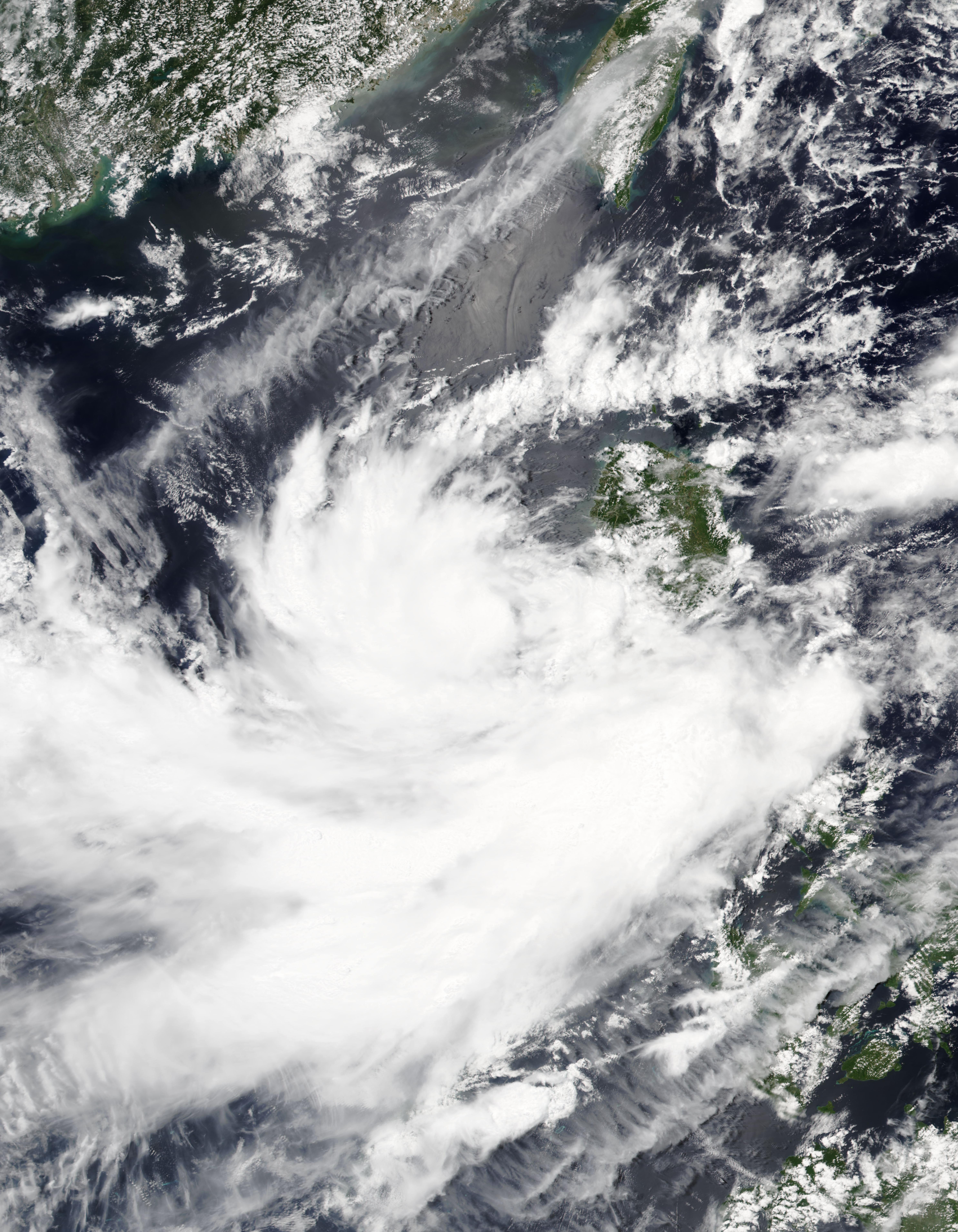
- Co-May intensifying to the west of Northern Luzon on July 24

Meteorological history
- Formed: July 22, 2025
- Remnant low: August 1, 2025
- Dissipated: August 3, 2025

Severe tropical storm
- 10-minute sustained (JMA)
- Highest winds: 110 km/h (70 mph)
- Lowest pressure: 975 hPa (mbar); 28.79 inHg

Category 1-equivalent typhoon
- 1-minute sustained (SSHWS/JTWC)
- Highest winds: 130 km/h (80 mph)
- Lowest pressure: 974 hPa (mbar); 28.76 inHg

Overall effects
- Fatalities: 29
- Damage: >$42.9 million (2025 USD)
- Areas affected: Philippines; Ryukyu Islands; China
- Part of the 2025 Pacific typhoon season

Severe Tropical Storm Co-May, (Note: The name Co-May (Vietnamese: cỏ may, [kɔ˧˩ maj˧˧]) was contributed by Vietnam and refers to a type of grass (Chrysopogon aciculatus) in Vietnamese.) (Note: Initially classified as a typhoon, Co-May was downgraded on post-analysis to a severe tropical storm according to the Japan Meteorological Agency's Best Track data on October 29, 2025.) known in the Philippines as Typhoon Emong, was an impactful and erratic tropical cyclone that affected the Philippines, specifically Ilocos Region and East China in late July 2025. The eighth named storm of the 2025 Pacific typhoon season, Co-May is the strongest system to make landfall in Pangasinan since Typhoon Chan-hom in 2009 and one of only four storms to do so.

Co-May originated from a low-pressure area southwest of Calayan, Cagayan on July 23. Due to the system being present in the Philippine Area of Responsibility (PAR), the Philippine Atmospheric, Geophysical and Astronomical Services Administration (PAGASA) named it Emong on the same day. The depression quickly moved through Balintang Islands and sharply tracked west-southwestward due to a Fujiwhara interaction with the nearby Tropical Storm Francisco, which was situated northeast of Luzon.

Later that day, the system was upgraded to a tropical storm and was given the name Co-May by the Japan Meteorological Agency (JMA), which is the replacement name for Lekima. The storm then moved southwestward, as it was situated in the eastern semicircle of a monsoon gyre. The storm would later rapidly intensify into a minimal, Category 1-equivalent typhoon on the Saffir–Simpson scale, with one-minute sustained winds of 120 km/h (75 mph). As it approached the southwestern edge of the gyre, Co-May altered its course and began tracking more southeastward after passing the inflection point. The system slightly weakened before it made landfall over Agno, Pangasinan during the night of July 24. Early on the following day, Co-May gradually weakened further as its outer bands crossed the rugged terrain of the Cordillera Range, and was downgraded to a severe tropical storm by the time of its second landfall over Candon City, Ilocos Sur.

The storm weakened into a tropical depression after passing through the mountains of the Cordillera. However, it regained tropical storm status over the Ryukyu Islands despite the marginal environment. Co-May made two additional landfalls in China: one on Zhujiajian Island, Zhejiang on July 29, and another in Fengxian District, Shanghai on July 30. Co-May then weakened into a remnant low before dissipating on August 3.

== Meteorological history ==
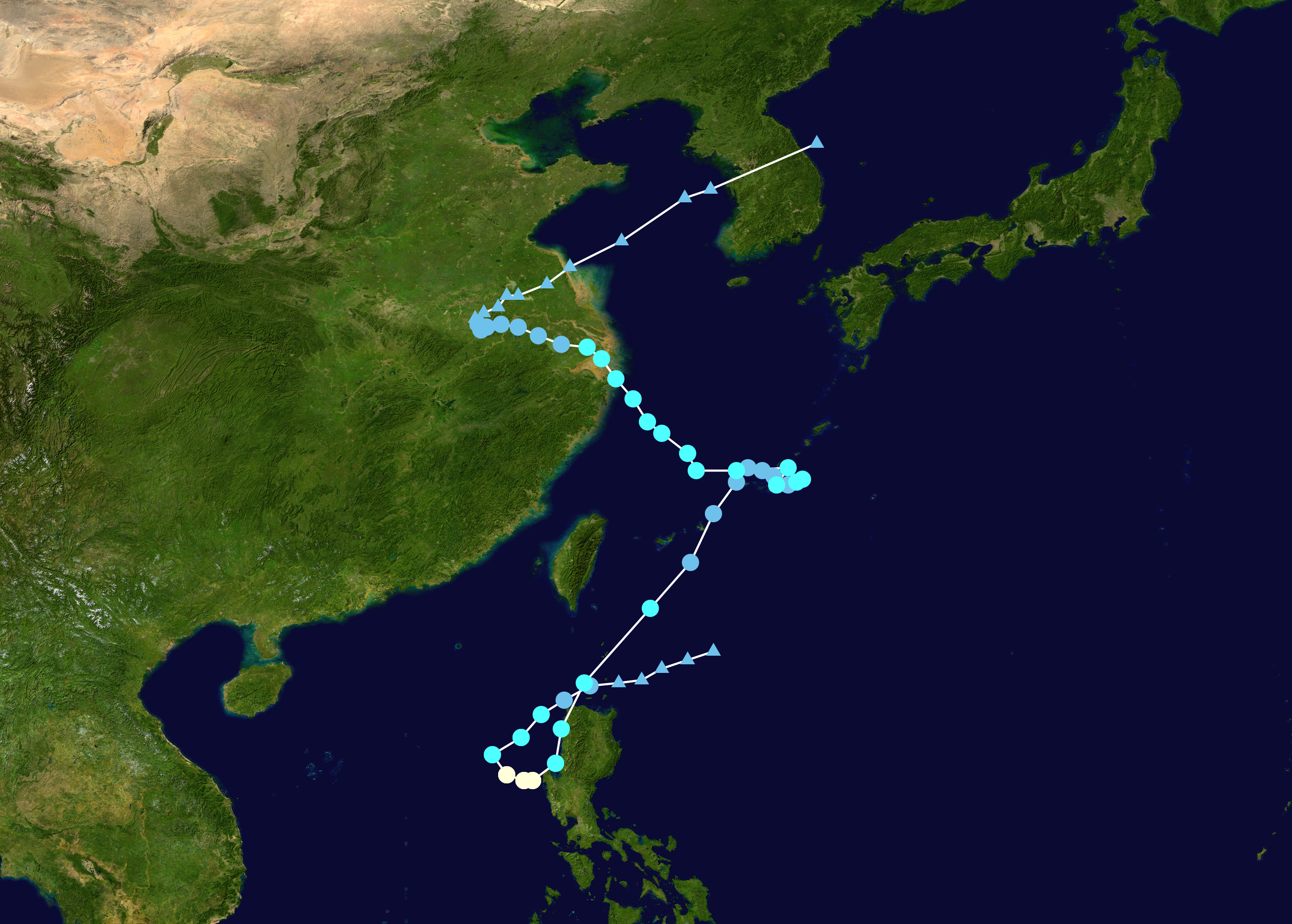
Map plotting the storm's track and intensity, according to the Saffir–Simpson scale Map key Saffir–Simpson scale Tropical depression (≤38 mph, ≤62 km/h) Tropical storm (39–73 mph, 63–118 km/h) Category 1 (74–95 mph, 119–153 km/h) Category 2 (96–110 mph, 154–177 km/h) Category 3 (111–129 mph, 178–208 km/h) Category 4 (130–156 mph, 209–251 km/h) Category 5 (≥157 mph, ≥252 km/h) Unknown Storm type Tropical cyclone Subtropical cyclone Extratropical cyclone, remnant low, tropical disturbance, or monsoon depression

In mid-July, PAGASA began monitoring an area of low pressure northeast of Ilocos Norte. The system started to organize on July 22 as it moved westward, prompting the Joint Typhoon Warning Center (JTWC) to designate it as Invest 99W. Later that day, PAGASA declared that the probability of cyclone formation was "high", and the disturbance intensified into a tropical depression, receiving the local name Emong. Concurrently, the JTWC issued a Tropical Cyclone Formation Alert (TCFA), citing high probability for tropical cyclogenesis before upgrading the system to a tropical depression and designated it 11W. The JMA also classified the system as a tropical depression shortly thereafter. By this time, however, both PAGASA and the JTWC had already upgraded 11W to a tropical storm. The JMA followed suit, assigning it the international name Co-May, the replacement name for the retired name Lekima following the 2019 season. The storm then turned west-southwestward towards the northwestern tip of Pangasinan. After undergoing rapid intensification overnight, Co-May was upgraded to a severe tropical storm by both PAGASA and the JMA on the morning of July 24. Later in the day, PAGASA and the JTWC announced that it reached typhoon intensity. The storm then altered its course, turning southeastward towards the area between Pangasinan and La Union.

Subsequently, the JMA also upgraded Co-May to a typhoon, but it was downgraded to Severe Tropical Storm in post-analysis. Then at 22:40 PHT (14:40 UTC), it made its first landfall in Agno, Pangasinan, bringing strong winds and heavy rainfall. This made Co-May the most powerful typhoon to strike the province since Chan-hom in 2009. Post-landfall interaction with the mountainous terrain of the Cordillera Central caused Co-May to weaken into a severe tropical storm as it tracked northeast. The system made a second landfall in Candon, Ilocos Sur, at 05:10 PHT on July 25 (21:10 UTC, July 24). Co-May continued to weaken as it moved over the Babuyan Channel and was downgraded to a tropical depression as it passed through the Ryukyu Islands.

On July 27, all monitoring agencies re-upgraded Co-May to a tropical storm as it tracked near Okinawa. The storm then turned westward towards China, where it made another landfall on Zhujiajian Island, Zhejiang on July 29 and in Fengxian District, Shanghai on July 30. It weakened into a remnant low over land on July 31 and its remnants passed through Yancheng and tracked across the Yellow Sea before dissipating over South Korea on August 3.

== Preparations ==
=== Philippines ===
==== Highest Tropical Cyclone Wind Signal ====
Highest Tropical Cyclone Wind Signal issued by PAGASA for Co-May (Emong) in each province. The white line represents the best track.

In anticipation of Co-May (known locally as Emong), PAGASA began issuing Tropical Cyclone Wind Signals. Signal #1 was initially hoisted over Ilocos Norte, the northwestern portion of La Union, and the western portion of Pangasinan due to the system's proximity to northern Luzon.

As the system rapidly intensified into a severe tropical storm, PAGASA subsequently raised Signal #3 over the entire provinces of Abra, Apayao, Ilocos Norte, Kalinga and Mountain Province. This signal also covered the central portion of Pangasinan, the extreme northern portion of Zambales, the northern and western portions of Cagayan, western portion of Benguet, as well as the remaining areas of the provinces that were placed in Signal #4. Signal #2 was later hoisted over the entire provinces of Babuyan Islands, Batanes, Ifugao, as well as the northern portion of Tarlac and Zambales, northern and western portions of Isabela, northwestern portion of Nueva Ecija and Quirino, and the western and central portions of Nueva Vizcaya. This signal also covered the remaining areas already placed under Signal #3.

Meanwhile, Signal #1 was raised over the northern portion of Bataan, northern and central portions of Aurora, western and central portions of Pampanga and the remaining localities of each province that were previously placed under Signal #2. Classes in Metro Manila and in some areas in Luzon and Western Visayas were suspended from July 24 and 25 due to Co-May and the enhanced southwest monsoon. Around 70 domestic and international flights were cancelled as Co-May nears Northern Luzon and the persistent heavy rain brought by the southwest monsoon.

When Co-May was upgraded into a typhoon by the PAGASA at 11:00 PHT (03:00 UTC), a Signal #4 warning was issued over the northern portion of Pangasinan, the northern and central portions of La Union, and the southwestern portion of Ilocos Sur. All the storm signal warnings were later discontinued on July 26.

== Impact ==
=== Philippines ===
Recent tropical cyclone activity from Wipha and Co-May in Southeast Asia

Co-May generated strong winds and floods in parts of the Philippines, resulting in extensive damage in Alaminos, Pangasinan and Naval Station Ernesto Ogbinar in San Fernando, La Union. Five people were rescued from floods in Burgos, Ilocos Norte. Flooding also blocked a highway in Bauang, La Union. A widespread power outage occurred in Baguio and nearby areas in Benguet at around 02:00 PHT on July 25 (18:00 UTC on July 24) as Co-May battered the Cordillera Central mountain range. Many provinces in Luzon and Visayas were placed under a state of calamity due to the severe damages caused by Co-May, including the effects of the southwest monsoon. In Calumpit, one person was killed due to flooding and incessant rains. Some portions of the area saw water reach 4 feet (1.2 m) high. Two people were electrocuted after touching a live electrical wire amid the storm. In Navotas, a navigational guide keeping water from overflowing the Navotas River was severely damaged. A sea wall in one of the city's barangays collapsed due to the storm, causing major flooding.

According to NDRRMC, total damage by Co-may, combined with tropical storms Wipha and Francisco, reached ₱16.51 billion (US$335.15 million) in infrastructure and ₱4.86 billion (US$98.61 million) in agriculture for a total of ₱21.36 billion (US$433.77 million).

=== China ===
Co-May brought torrential rainfall and strong winds to eastern China, resulting in evacuations and widespread transport disruptions in Shanghai and the provinces of Zhejiang and Jiangsu, which experienced the most severe effects of the storm. On the afternoon of 30 July, the Shanghai Meteorological Bureau issued an orange rainstorm warning, the second-highest level in China's four-tier warning system. A total of 640 flights were cancelled, including 410 at Shanghai Pudong International Airport and 230 at Shanghai Hongqiao International Airport. Approximately 283,000 people were evacuated from coastal and low-lying areas as Co-May made its first landfall. Damage by Co-May in China was estimated at about 300 million yuan (US$42.9 million).

== Retirement ==
Due to its destructive impact in the Philippines, the ESCAP/WMO Typhoon Committee has retired the name Co-May, along with seven others, from the rotating storm name lists during its 58th Session, and it will never be used to name another storm in the Western Pacific despite its first usage. Its replacement name will be announced in 2027.

On March 19, 2026, PAGASA retired the name Emong from its rotating naming lists on account of the contributing damage with Tropical Storm Wipha and due to the damage and loss of life it caused. It will never be used again as a typhoon name within the PAR. It was replaced with Elias, a character in Jose Rizal's novel Noli Me Tángere for the 2029 season.

== See also ==
- Weather of 2025
- Tropical cyclones in 2025
- Typhoons in the Philippines

Other similar tropical cyclones:

- Typhoon Flo (Kadiang; 1993) – An erratic and catastrophic minimal typhoon that hit similar areas.
- Typhoon Vicki (Gading; 1998) – A relatively strong, Category 2-equivalent typhoon which struck northwestern Philippines and Japan.
- Tropical Storm Halong (Cosme; 2008) – A tropical storm that also followed a similar path.
- Typhoon Chan-hom (Emong; 2009) – A typhoon with the same Philippine name which followed a comparable trajectory.
- Hurricane Eta (2020) – similarly erratic storm in the Atlantic
