= Typhoon Lekima =

Pacific typhoon in 2019

Typhoon Lekima (Hanna)
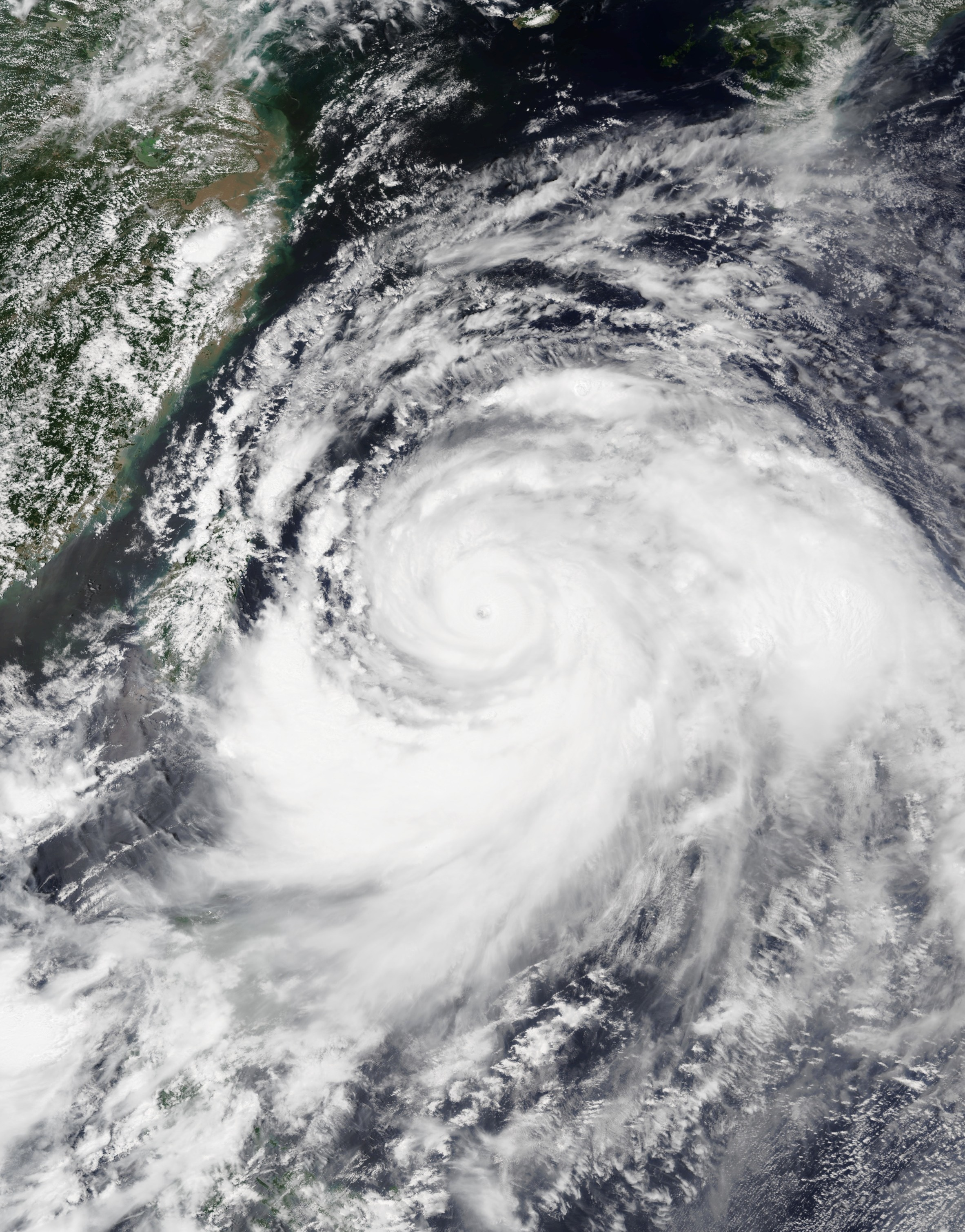
- Typhoon Lekima near its peak intensity while above Ryukyu Islands on August 8

Meteorological history
- Formed: August 2, 2019
- Extratropical: August 14, 2019
- Dissipated: August 14, 2019

Violent typhoon
- 10-minute sustained (JMA)
- Highest winds: 195 km/h (120 mph)
- Lowest pressure: 925 hPa (mbar); 27.32 inHg

Category 4-equivalent super typhoon
- 1-minute sustained (SSHWS/JTWC)
- Highest winds: 250 km/h (155 mph)
- Lowest pressure: 904 hPa (mbar); 26.70 inHg

Overall effects
- Fatalities: 105 total
- Damage: $9.28 billion (2019 USD) (Fourth-costliest in Chinese history)
- Areas affected: Caroline Islands, East China, Philippines, Ryukyu Islands, Taiwan, Malaysia
- IBTrACS
- Part of the 2019 Pacific typhoon season

Typhoon Lekima, (Note: The name Lekima (Vietnamese: lêkima, [le˧˧ ki˧˧ maː˧˧]) was contributed by Vietnam and means lucuma (Pouteria lucuma) in Vietnamese.) known in the Philippines as Typhoon Hanna, was the fourth costliest typhoon in Chinese history. The ninth named storm of the 2019 Pacific typhoon season, Lekima originated from a tropical depression that formed east of the Philippines on 30 July. It gradually organized, became a tropical storm, and was named on 4 August. Lekima intensified under favorable environmental conditions and peaked as a Category 4–equivalent Super typhoon. However, an eyewall replacement cycle caused the typhoon to weaken before it made landfall in Zhejiang early on 10 August, as a Category 2–equivalent typhoon. Lekima weakened subsequently while moving across Eastern China, and made its second landfall in Shandong on 11 August.

Lekima's precursor enhanced the southwestern monsoon in the Philippines, which brought heavy rain to the country. The rains caused three boats to sink and 31 people died in this accident. Lekima brought catastrophic damage in mainland China, with a death toll of 71 people and more than CN¥65.37 billion (US$9.26 billion) in damages. The system also caused minor damage in Ryukyu Islands and Taiwan. In Malaysia, the typhoon brought up strong tides and partially destroyed the coastal areas of Penang.

== Meteorological history ==
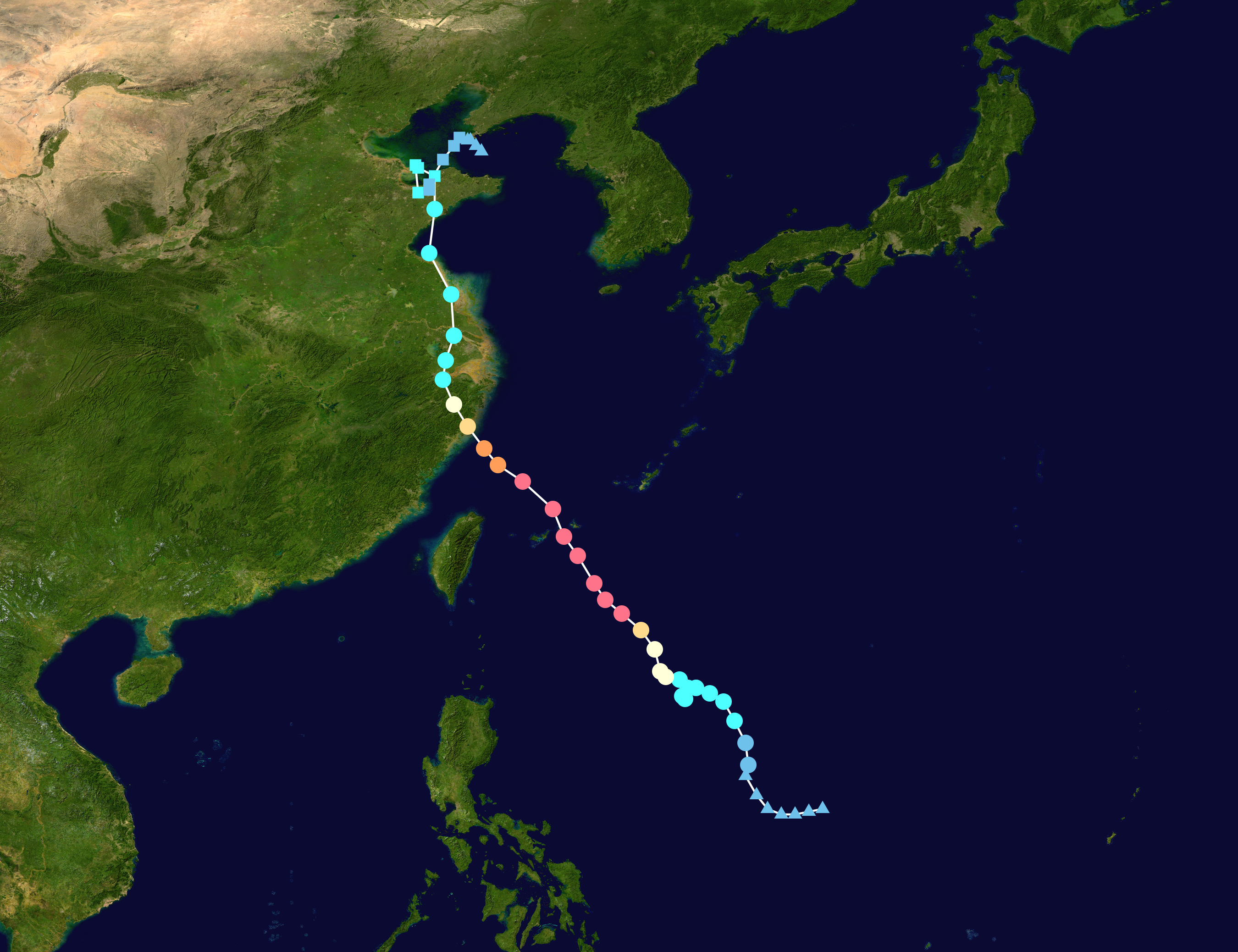
Map plotting the storm's track and intensity, according to the Saffir–Simpson scale Map key Saffir–Simpson scale Tropical depression (≤38 mph, ≤62 km/h) Tropical storm (39–73 mph, 63–118 km/h) Category 1 (74–95 mph, 119–153 km/h) Category 2 (96–110 mph, 154–177 km/h) Category 3 (111–129 mph, 178–208 km/h) Category 4 (130–156 mph, 209–251 km/h) Category 5 (≥157 mph, ≥252 km/h) Unknown Storm type Tropical cyclone Subtropical cyclone Extratropical cyclone, remnant low, tropical disturbance, or monsoon depression

On 2 August, the Japan Meteorological Agency (JMA) began to monitor a tropical depression which developed over the Philippine Sea. The next day, the PAGASA would later name it as "Hanna". The system slowly developed while moving northward. The Joint Typhoon Warning Center (JTWC) also monitored the system and gave the identifier 10W early on 4 August. The JMA upgraded the system to a tropical storm and assigned the name Lekima at 6:00 a.m. UTC that day. The JTWC followed suit later that day. Though Lekima was affected by moderate wind shear, warm waters of 31 °C (88 °F) and good outflow channel allowed Lekima to slowly intensify, and Lekima became almost stationary due to the absence of steering current.

On 6 August, Lekima steered by a subtropical ridge to the northeast and accelerated to the northwest, and the JMA upgraded Lekima to a severe tropical storm. Later that day, both JMA and JTWC upgraded Lekima to a typhoon, after the system developed a central dense overcast. As Lekima continued to move northwestward, the system moved into an area of low wind shear, and it started a process of rapid intensification on 7 August. The eye became evident on satellite imagery. On 8 August, the JTWC upgraded Lekima to a super typhoon, and stated that the system had acquired some of the annular characteristics. Later that day, the JMA stated that Lekima attained maximum sustained winds of 195 km/h (121 mph). At the same time, Lekima passed between Miyako-jima and Tarama-jima.

Shortly thereafter, Lekima began an eyewall replacement cycle. The typhoon developed a concentric eyewall, as seen from the radar. This cycle also caused the motion of Lekima slightly veered to the north, and the JTWC downgraded Lekima back to typhoon late on 8 August. The same day, PAGASA reported that "Hanna" exited their Philippine Area of Responsibility. Environmental conditions in East China Sea became less favourable, causing Lekima to slowly weaken while approaching East China. At 1:45 a.m. China Standard Time (UTC+08:00) 10 August, Lekima made landfall in Wenling, Zhejiang with two-minute sustained winds of 185 km/h (115 mph). Lekima quickly weakened and turned to the north, along the western side of the subtropical ridge. Lekima dropped below typhoon intensity early on August 10, and weakened further to a tropical storm later that day. Lekima emerged into the Yellow Sea early on 11 August, and made second landfall in Xihai'an, Qingdao, Shandong at 8:50 p.m. CST, with two-minute sustained winds of 85 km/h (53 mph). The JTWC issued its final warning to the system around that time. Lekima meandered over the Shandong Peninsula and Bohai Sea throughout 12 August, and the JMA downgraded it to a tropical depression later that day.

== Preparations ==
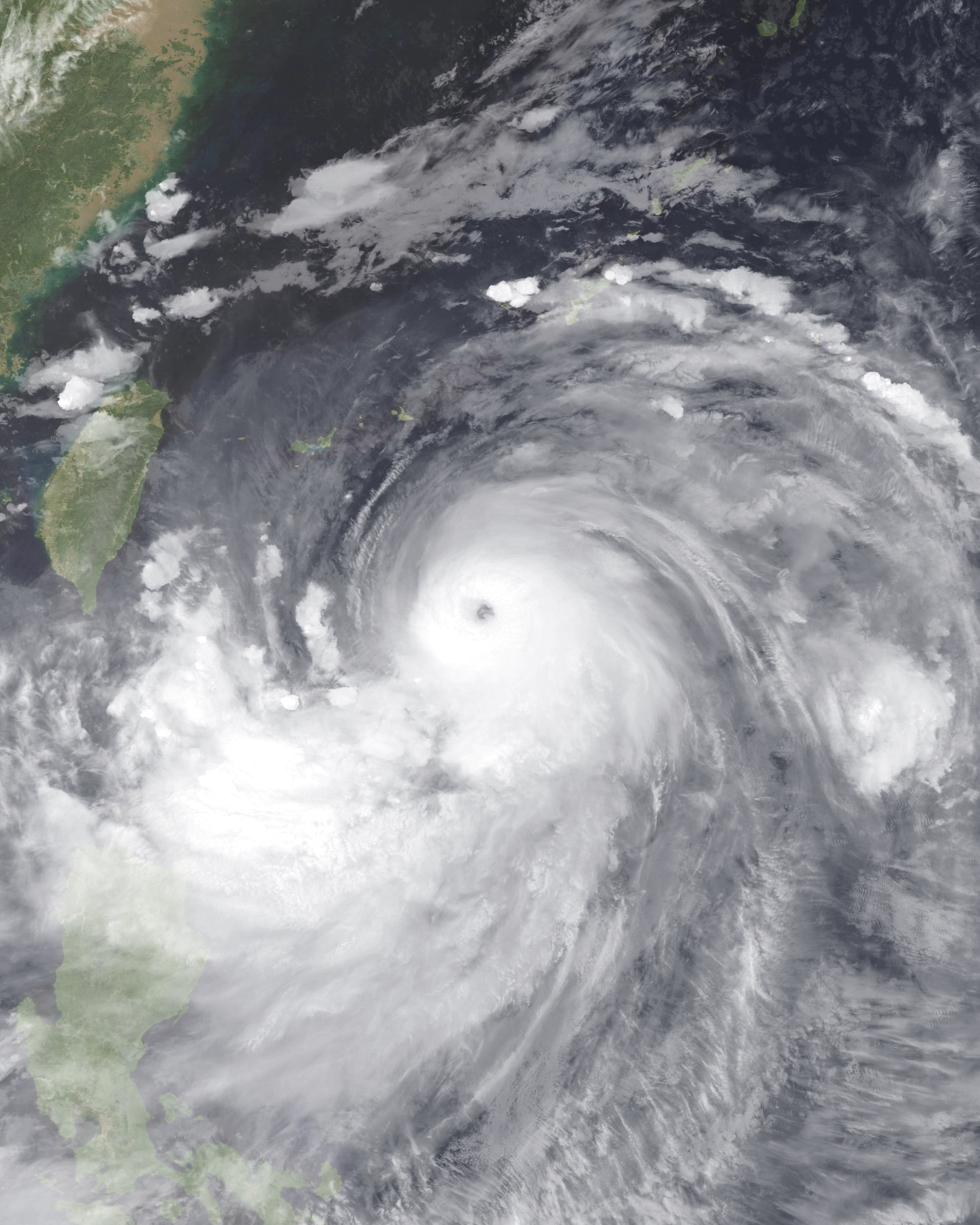
Typhoon Lekima rapidly intensifying to a Category 4 typhoon while approaching China on August 7

As Lekima moved northwestward and approached the northern part of the Philippines, PAGASA issued PSWS#1 to Batanes and the Babuyan Islands late on 6 August. These warnings were lifted after Lekima left the Philippine Area of Responsibility. As Lekima approached the southwestern Ryukyu Islands, Ishigaki-jima and Miyako-jima received a storm warning. The JMA urged the residents on these islands to beware of high waves, heavy rain, and sudden gusts.

Taiwan's Central Weather Bureau (CWB) issued a sea warning on 7 August. As Lekima continued to approach the island, the CWB issued a land warning to the northern part of Taiwan early on the next day, locally. The CWB lifted the land warning late on 9 August, and lifted the sea warning early on the next day, after Lekima made landfall in East China. On late 8 August, school and work were cancelled for the next day in eight municipalities and counties in the northern part of Taiwan and in the Matsu Islands. Hundreds of flights and ships were cancelled and delayed.

Ahead of Lekima, the Government of China issued a yellow alert on 8 August. This was upgraded into a red later early the next day. In addition, gale warnings were put in effect for the Yangtze Delta megalopolis. Across China, more than one million people were evacuated in advance of the typhoon, including 260,000 in Shanghai and 800,000 in Zhejiang Province. About 110,000 people relocated to roughly 12,000 shelters across China. About 625 flights in Beijing, Shanghai, Guangzhou, Shenzhen, and Chengdu airports were cancelled. Shanghai also halted its rail transit services, including its maglev trains. Several dozen trains connecting northern and central China with Zhejiang Province were also affected by the storm, hundreds of ferries were also cancelled, transit lanes were shut down, and the emergency level was raised to its highest level in the province on 9 August. Zhejiang Province officials supplied 1,000 member rescue teams with 150 firetrucks and 153 boats. Regions in the path of the storm were required by the State Flood Control and Drought Relief Headquarters to relocate all residents in at-risk areas and to guard areas against possible impacts. Che Jun, the Zhejiang Party Secretary, ensured measures to protect fisherman and ships were forced to return to port. Authorities in Shanghai worked to secure outdoor facilities, billboards, and lighting structures to avoid typhoon damage. In Beijing, a total of 77 tourist sites were closed for the typhoon, including portions of the Great Wall of China, although, the most-visited areas of the wall remained open. Shanghai Disneyland was also closed for the storm. Across Shanghai, a total of 92 attractions were shut down because of Lekima, including the Shanghai Museum, Shanghai Center, and Shanghai Zoo.

== Impact ==
=== Philippines ===
Though Lekima, locally known as "Hanna", did not directly affect the Philippines it contributed to the southwest monsoon which caused heavy rain to the nation. Three boats sank in Guimaras Strait; 31 people died and three were left missing. Heavy rains also caused flooding in Metro Manila. Schools in many cities suspended classes on 5 August. A motorboat carrying 10 passengers capsized off the coast of Mactan Island in the early morning of 7 August. To the south waves from Lekima displaced more than 1,300 people in Davao City. Agricultural damage in Central Luzon was at ₱80.5 million (US$1.55 million).

=== Ryukyu Islands ===
Gusts in Miyako-jima reached 168 km/h (104 mph), while gusts in Shimojishima Airport and Iriomote-jima reached 156 km/h (97 mph) and 125 km/h (78 mph) respectively. Six people were injured during the storm, and thousands of families suffered from power outages. Hundreds of flights and passenger ship trips were cancelled on 7–9 August, mainly in Miyako-jima and Ishigaki-jima, affecting thousands of passengers. Agricultural damage across the island chain was JP¥347 million (US$3.29 million).

=== Taiwan ===
Throughout Taiwan Lekima killed two people and injured 15 others. More than 80,000 families suffered power outages. On 8–9 August, Wufeng Township recorded a rainfall total of 385 mm (15.2 in), while rainfall in Taichung amounted to 355.5 mm (14.00 in). Lekima's downdraft affected Kinmen on 9 August, where a farmland recorded temperature of 39.9 °C (103.8 °F), setting the national record for the second highest temperature. Jinfeng Township also recorded a temperature of 36.8 °C (98.2 °F). Institutional damage from Lekima, along with a magnitude 6.0 earthquake reached NT$5.24 million (US$167,000).

=== Mainland China ===
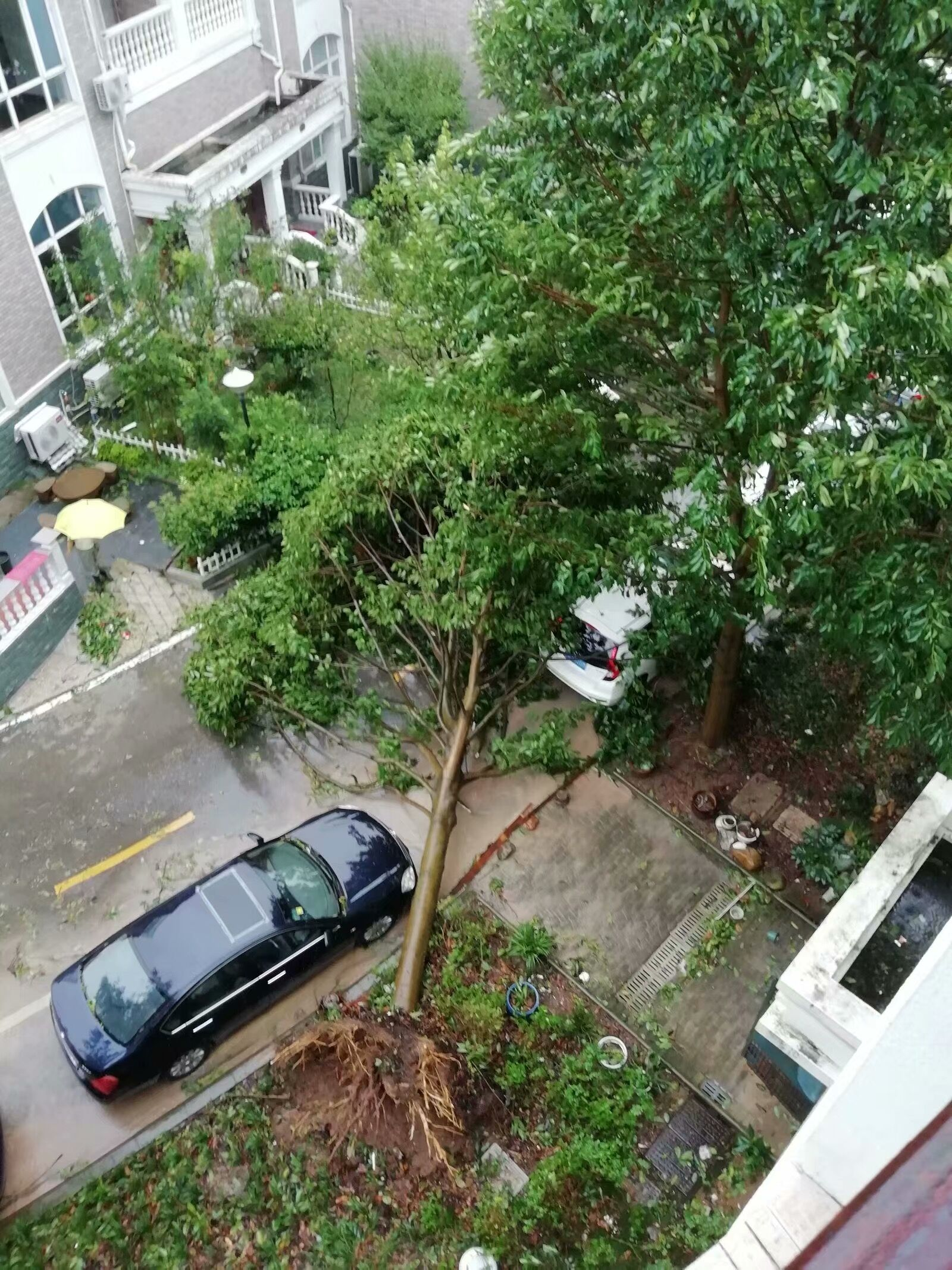
Typhoon Lekima uprooted a tree in Xianju County, Zhejiang.

Striking East China as a super typhoon, according to China Meteorological Administration, Lekima wrought major damage across numerous provinces. In all, the typhoon killed 71 people. Damage nationwide exceeds CN¥65.37 billion (US$9.26 billion). Zhejiang was the worst hit province; 45 people died in the province, and economic loss reached CN¥45.38 billion (US$6.43 billion). Most of those killed died because of landslides in Yongjia County, and the landslides blocked a river. Water levels rose 10 m (33 ft) in ten minutes, and many residents could not evacuate in time. Wenling recorded peak wind gusts of 221 km/h (137 mph), while daily rainfall in Beilun District amounted to 291 mm (11.5 in).

Lekima also brought significant effects to Shandong where 5 people were killed, 7 remain missing, and the damage statewide amounted to over CN¥16 billion (US$2.27 billion). Because Lekima looped around Shandong for days, it brought heavy rainfall in the province. Daily rainfall in Linqu County reached 386.7 mm (15.22 in).

=== Malaysia ===
Lekima's tail reached south to Malaysia and hit the northern states of the Malay Peninsula on 9 August, which killed a person, left one missing, and injuring ten others in the states of Kedah, Penang and Perak. The storm also caused damage to 329 schools, and the damage was about RM20 million (US$4.77 million). Wind speeds in some areas were recorded at 100 km/h (62 mph). Hundreds of trees were uprooted. 1,358 houses in Kedah were damaged by Lekima. Total damage in Malaysia reached RM60.2 million (US$14.4 million).

== Retirement ==
Due to the severe impact of the storm in China, the name Lekima was retired during the 52nd annual session of the ESCAP/WMO Typhoon Committee in February 2020. In February 2021, the Typhoon Committee chose Co-May as its replacement name, but Co-may was also retired after 2025 and its replacement name will be announced in 2027<refhttps://www.typhooncommittee.org/tc58.html></ref>.

== See also ==
- Other typhoons named Lekima
- Tropical cyclones in 2019
- Weather of 2019
- Typhoon Matsa (2005)
- Typhoon Saola (2012)
- Typhoon Fitow (2013) — Third costliest typhoon in Chinese history
- Tropical Storm Fung-wong (2014)
- Typhoon Chan-hom (2015)
- Typhoon Vongfong (2020)
- Typhoon In-fa (2021)
- Typhoon Doksuri (2023) — Costliest typhoon in Chinese history
- Typhoon Yagi (2024) — Second costliest typhoon in Chinese history
