= Tropical Storm Linfa (2003) =

Pacific severe tropical storm in 2003

Severe Tropical Storm Linfa (Chedeng)
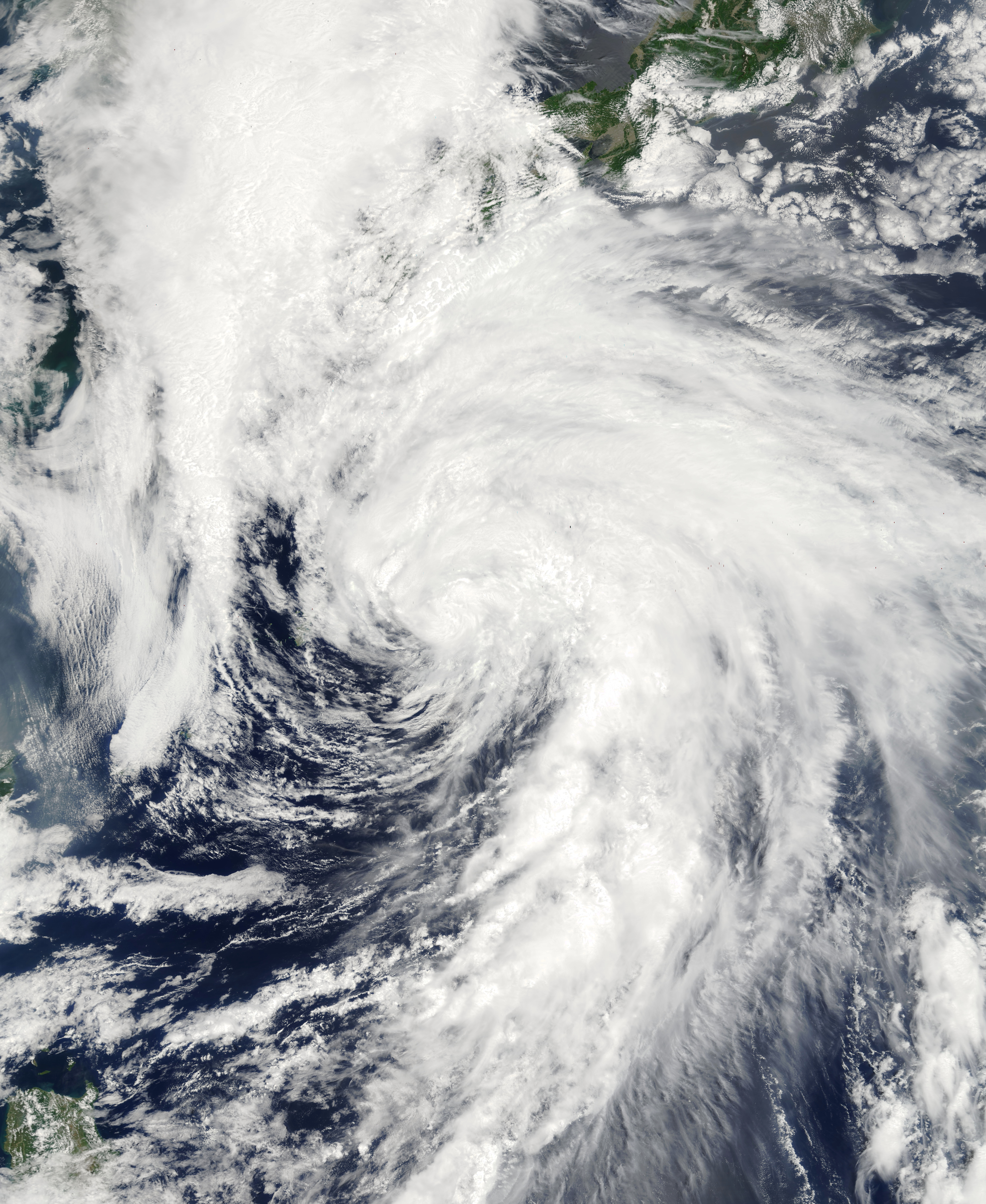
- Tropical Storm Linfa at peak intensity on May 30

Meteorological history
- Formed: May 25, 2003
- Extratropical: May 30, 2003
- Dissipated: June 2, 2003

Severe tropical storm
- 10-minute sustained (JMA)
- Highest winds: 100 km/h (65 mph)
- Lowest pressure: 980 hPa (mbar); 28.94 inHg

Tropical storm
- 1-minute sustained (SSHWS/JTWC)
- Highest winds: 110 km/h (70 mph)
- Lowest pressure: 984 hPa (mbar); 29.06 inHg

Overall effects
- Fatalities: 41 total
- Damage: $28.2 million (2003 USD)
- Areas affected: Philippines; Japan
- IBTrACS
- Part of the 2003 Pacific typhoon season

Severe Tropical Storm Linfa, (Note: The name Linfa (Cantonese: 蓮花, [liːn˨˩ faː˥]) was contributed by Macau and means lotus (Nelumbo nucifera) in Cantonese.) known in the Philippines as Tropical Storm Chedeng, brought deadly flooding to areas of the Philippines and Japan in late May and early June 2003. The fourth named storm within the northwestern Pacific that year, Linfa developed as a tropical depression just off the western coast of Luzon on May 25. The disturbance quickly intensified to reach tropical storm intensity a few hours after cyclogenesis. However, intensification leveled off as Linfa executed a small clockwise loop before a subsequent landfall on Luzon on May 27. Due to land interaction the storm temporarily weakened and decoupled before reforming in the Philippine Sea. Afterwards Linfa began reintensifying and reached its peak intensity on May 29 with maximum sustained winds of 100 km/h (65 mph) and a barometric pressure of 980 mbar (hPa; 28.94 inHg). (Note: All maximum sustained wind figures were measured over a period of ten minutes, unless otherwise noted.) Following its peak the tropical storm began to deteriorate and transitioned into an extratropical cyclone on May 30; these extratropical remnants continued to track northward through Japan before dissipating in the Sea of Okhotsk on June 4.

The erratic and slow movement of Linfa off the western Philippines was the catalyst for extreme rainfall and flooding, killing 41 persons in the archipelago. Precipitation peaked at 723 mm (28.5 in) near Dagupan. Rising floodwaters resulted in numerous mudslides and the temporary shutdown of government offices. In addition, strong winds caused widespread power outages. Overall damage from Linfa in the Philippines amounted to ₱192.3 million (US$3.65 million). (Note: All damage totals are in the 2003 value of their respective currencies) The floods also displaced 8,367 people in 1,686 families and destroyed 178 homes. Linfa and its extratropical remnants later brought torrential rainfall and widespread flooding to Japan, particularly southwestern regions. Rainfall there peaked at 727 mm (28.62 in). Flood damage was worst in Kōchi and Tokushima Prefectures, where several buildings were destroyed by floodwater. Other locations in Japan experienced considerable agricultural damage as well as numerous landslides. Overall, Linfa caused roughly $28.2 million in damage, much of which occurred in Japan, though the entirety of deaths associated with the cyclone took place in the Philippines.

== Meteorological history ==
Map plotting the storm's track and intensity, according to the Saffir–Simpson scale Map key Saffir–Simpson scale Tropical depression (≤38 mph, ≤62 km/h) Tropical storm (39–73 mph, 63–118 km/h) Category 1 (74–95 mph, 119–153 km/h) Category 2 (96–110 mph, 154–177 km/h) Category 3 (111–129 mph, 178–208 km/h) Category 4 (130–156 mph, 209–251 km/h) Category 5 (≥157 mph, ≥252 km/h) Unknown Storm type Tropical cyclone Subtropical cyclone Extratropical cyclone, remnant low, tropical disturbance, or monsoon depression

In late-May an area of disturbed weather began to persist roughly 650 km (400 mi) west of Manila, Philippines in the South China Sea. Late on May 23, the Joint Typhoon Warning Center (JTWC) began to monitor the area for potential signs of tropical cyclogenesis. Over the next few days the disturbance began to consolidate towards a common low pressure center, resulting in a burst in convective activity. At 0000 UTC on May 25, the JTWC classified the resulting system as a tropical depression west of Luzon; six hours later both the Japan Meteorological Agency (JMA) and the Philippine Atmospheric, Geophysical and Astronomical Services Administration (PAGASA) began to monitor the newly formed tropical cyclone, though the latter classified it as a tropical storm. During these initial stages of development the tropical cyclone slowly intensified as it slowly tracked in a clockwise loop throughout the course of the day. At 1800 UTC, the JTWC upgraded the depression to tropical storm status while the JMA followed suit six hours later, thus designating the cyclone with the name Linfa.

In response to a strengthening ridge to the south, Linfa began tracking eastward. Despite its proximity to land, the tropical storm's slow forward motion allowed for additional strengthening, and according to the JMA, Linfa reached an initial peak intensity with maximum sustained winds of 90 km/h (50 mph) at 0000 UTC on May 27, just within the threshold of severe tropical storm status. Concurrently the cyclone made landfall near Dagupan, Luzon. Upon landfall, Linfa began to weaken as it crossed Luzon before emerging into the Pacific as a minimal tropical storm late that day. However, as a result of land interaction the initial surface circulation center of Linfa greatly weakened and was overtaken by a newly formed low-level circulation center on May 28, resulting in the storm's position to shift well northeastward. This was the primary basis on which the JTWC downgraded Linfa to tropical depression status early on May 28, though the JMA continued to analyze the system as a weak tropical storm. Afterwards, as the cyclone began to track northeastward, the new circulation center became more organized, resulting in the JTWC reclassifying Linfa as a tropical storm at 0600 UTC the following day. Gradual strengthening followed, and at 1800 UTC that day Linfa reached peak intensity with winds of 100 km/h (65 mph) and a minimum barometric pressure of 980 mbar (hPa; 28.94 inHg) south of Okinawa. Subsequently, the system began to take a more northward course and undergo extratropical transition, which was completed at 1200 UTC on May 30. Though by this time most tropical cyclone monitoring agencies ceased the monitoring of these extratropical remnants by this time, the JMA continued to track them as they made landfall near Uwajima, Ehime at 2130 UTC. Linfa's remnants then paralleled the western coast of Japan before dissipating on June 4 well into the Sea of Okhotsk.

== Impact and aftermath ==
=== Philippines ===
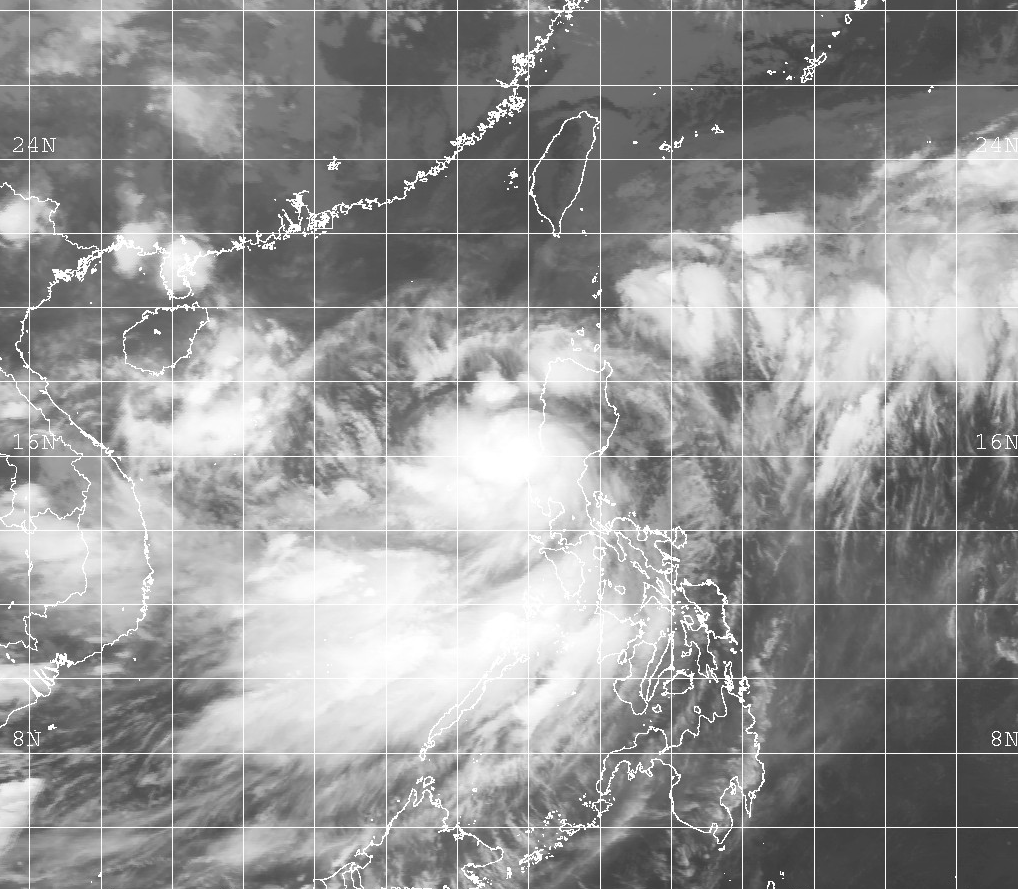
Tropical Storm Linfa making landfall in Ilocos Region, Luzon on May 27

Linfa's slow movement off the western coast of Luzon, followed by its eventual landfall, allowed for copious amounts of rain to occur in areas of the Philippines, leading to widespread flooding. Prior to landfall, waves generated by Linfa offshore hampered search and rescue operations following the collision of the MV San Nicholas and SuperFerry 12 ships on May 25. Over land, precipitation amounts officially peaked at a station in Dagupan, near the tropical storm's point of landfall. There, 723 mm (28.5 in) of rainfall was observed, including 629 mm (24.8 in) of rain in a 12‑hour period. The second highest precipitation total from a station operated by the World Meteorological Organization observed 364 mm (14.3 in) of rain in Baguio. These rainfall totals were further enhanced by the concurrent southwesterly monsoon. The resulting floods forced then-President of the Philippines Gloria Macapagal Arroyo to order the temporary shutdown of government offices and mobilize city officials to aid in clearing threatened areas of people. In addition, commuter bus operations were forced to cease.

The first documented fatality associated with the storm occurred in Taytay, Rizal, after heavy rains on May 27 triggered a mudslide that killed an infant and injured three other people. That same day the rains resulted in thick traffic jams in Manila. Strong winds in the capital city also toppled billboards and electric posts. Floodwaters forced over 600 families to evacuate in Valenzuela, a suburb located northwest of Manila. Similarly strong winds in Pangasinan caused widespread power outage to much of the province. Areas in the central parts of the province experienced their worst flooding conditions in at least 60 years. Two ferries capsized off of Minalabac, Camarines Sur, killing six people. Sixty-seven others were rescued in the search and rescue operation that followed the incident. Overall, Linfa killed 41 people in the Philippines due to flooding. Damage associated with the tropical storm included ₱66 million (US$1.25 million) to agriculture and livestock, ₱83.4 million (US$1.58 million) to fisheries, and ₱42.9 million (US$800,000) to infrastructure, equating to a total of ₱192.3 million (US$3.65 million) in damage in the Philippines. Nationwide, 8,367 persons in roughly 1,686 families evacuated into 44 evacuation centers at the height of the storm. The floods destroyed 178 homes and damaged an additional 2,040.

In the immediate aftermath of the storm and associated flooding, the Department of Agriculture readied for the distribution of 3 million bangus fry, 250,000 tilapia fry, and 315 bags of rice seeds to affected regions. Furthermore, the National Food Authority allocated 200 sacks of rice to Pangasinan. The National Disaster Risk Reduction and Management Council assisted in relief operations by allocating ₱10 million (US$200,000) and 800 bags of rice for such efforts. In addition, one of eight regional Filipino health offices distributed roughly ₱600,000 (US$10,000) worth of various medicines to Dagupan and Urdaneta, Pangasinan. According to the National Disaster Coordinating Council, ₱15.7 million (US$300,000) worth in relief operations was allocated.

=== Japan ===
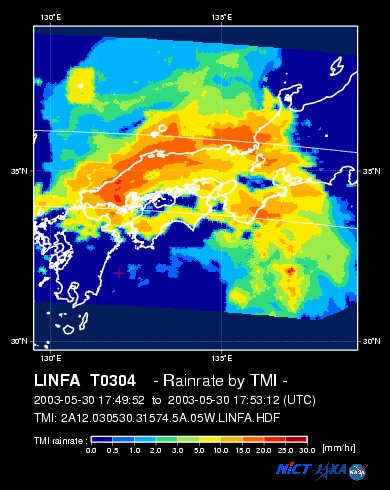
Estimated rainfall rate within Linfa on May 30 as documented by the TRMM.

After tracking eastward across the Philippines, Linfa reorganized and curved northeastward toward Japan. The Japan Meteorological Agency anticipated heavy precipitation and strong winds in the island nation's southwestern regions. The agency also warned residents in low-lying areas of potential flooding. The JMA indicated the heightened possibility of landslides in the Tōhoku region due to a recent earthquake in the area. Due to the forecasted impacts and track, as many as 102 domestic flights were cancelled in a single day, particularly those associated with southwestern Japan. In addition, five ferry services were cancelled. Upon making landfall on Shikoku, Linfa became the first tropical cyclone since 1965 to strike Japan during May, as well as the third earliest tropical cyclone to make landfall on any of Japan's four main islands since standardized records began in 1951.

Throughout Linfa's passage of Japan, the storm brought heavy rainfall across a wide swath of the country, resulting in extensive and damaging flooding. Damage was primarily concentrated on Kyushu Island. Precipitation peaked at 727 mm (28.62 in) at a station in Nakagoya, Miyazaki Prefecture. However, a station in Owase, Mie observed 497 mm (19.56 in) of rain in 24 hours, greater than any other location for that period of time. Despite making landfall on Ehime Prefecture, Linfa did not cause as much damage there relative to other provinces, particularly those bordering Ehime. Nonetheless, nearly 300 homes lost power during the storm there. Linfa's worst impacts occurred in Kōchi Prefecture, where severe flooding inundated several buildings and triggered numerous landslides. Damage there totaled ¥1.28 billion (US$10.7 million). Similar effects took place in Tokushima Prefecture, in addition to widespread evacuations from impacted areas. Damage accrued by Linfa in Tokushima Prefecture reached ¥1.22 billion (US$10.3 million). Located near the coast, high seas generated by Linfa were reported in Wakayama Prefecture, resulting in cancellations of offshore activities and transportation. However, much of the damage in Wakayama Prefecture was caused by torrential precipitation, damaging roads in seven locations, amounting to ¥197.45 million (US$1.65 million). Severe flooding in Mie Prefecture resulted from heavy, prolonged rainfall, which peaked prefecture-wide at 497 mm (19.57 in) in Owase. Precipitation in Mie caused widespread power outages. As many as 65 buildings were flooded, and approximately 87 ha (215 ac) of arable land was inundated by rainwater. In addition to surface inundation, the rains caused twenty landslides, blocking roads the traffic and suspending some rail operations. Power outages were also widespread in Hyōgo Prefecture, including a localized outage stripping electricity from 900 homes in the Kita-ku ward in Kobe; similar impacts occurred in Osaka Prefecture. Rising floodwater in Kanagawa Prefecture engulfed the first floors of several office buildings and residences. The rain also deluged roads in Yokohama, Fujisawa, Chigasaki and Odawara.

On Nishino-shima Island in Honshu's Shimane Prefecture, precipitation caused the deterioration of surface sediments, resulting in landslides that damaged several buildings. Agricultural damage totaled to ¥660,000 (US$5,500), and three flights were cancelled at Oki Airport. Multiple landslides occurred in Miyagi Prefecture. In Kesennuma, the rains triggered a rockfall, prompting evacuations and damaging a home. A second rockfall incident occurred on June 2, destroying several buildings. Residents of Ogachi and Ishinomaki were ordered to evacuate due to the threat of additional rockfalls and landslides. In both Hino and Kurayoshi, Tottori, heavy rain caused damage to roads and farmland erosion. The precipitation also caused a river to flow over its banks, flooding adjacent land. Damage in Tottori Prefecture amounted to ¥8.9 million (US$75,000). Significant damage occurred in Ōita Prefecture, where heavy rains caused landslides and suspended rail operations. Most of the damage in Ōita Prefecture was done to crops, particularly vegetables, and totaled ¥27.37 million (US$230,000). Damage to sweet potato and tobacco crops alone in Kagoshima Prefecture reached ¥21 million (US$180,000), while damage to agricultural infrastructure totaled ¥2 million (US$16,800). Damage to tobacco crops in Miyazaki Prefecture were estimated even higher at ¥50.57 million (US$420,000). In Nagasaki Prefecture, the rains also damaged forests, with damage estimated at ¥23 million (US$190,000); other agricultural damage was estimated at ¥60 million (US$500,000). Voluntary evacuation procedures took place in Fukue, Nagasaki due to the threat of building collapse.

Despite transitioning into an extratropical cyclone during its passage of Japan, Linfa still maintained strong winds, which caused heavy damage to susceptible structures. The highest wind associated with Linfa in Japan was clocked at 119 km/h (74 mph) in Murotomisaki, Kōchi Prefecture. Operations on the Tōhoku Main Line were delayed as a result of strong winds onset by Linfa. Wind gusts as high as 55 km/h (35 mph) in Nakatsugawa in Tochigi Prefecture caused the complete destruction of at least five buildings and damaged several others, resulting in ¥$760,000 (US$6,400) in damage. More considerable damage occurred in Shiga Prefecture, where strong winds caused damage to greenhouses and nearby crops, accruing ¥36.75 million (US$308,700) in damage. In addition, two people were injured after winds threw a section of plywood into the car they were occupying.

== See also ==
- Tropical cyclones in 2003
- Weather of 2003
- Other tropical cyclones named Linfa
- Other tropical cyclones named Chedeng
- Typhoon Vicki (1998) – brought flooding over areas of Luzon before leading to widespread disruption of air and ground traffic in Japan
- Tropical Storm Merbok (2004) – short-lived tropical storm that exacerbated flood conditions in Luzon
- Tropical Storm Halong (2008) – brought strong winds and heavy rain in the northern Philippines before impacting Japan as an extratropical cyclone
