= Tropical Storm Halong (2008) =

Pacific severe tropical storm in 2008

Severe Tropical Storm Halong (Cosme)
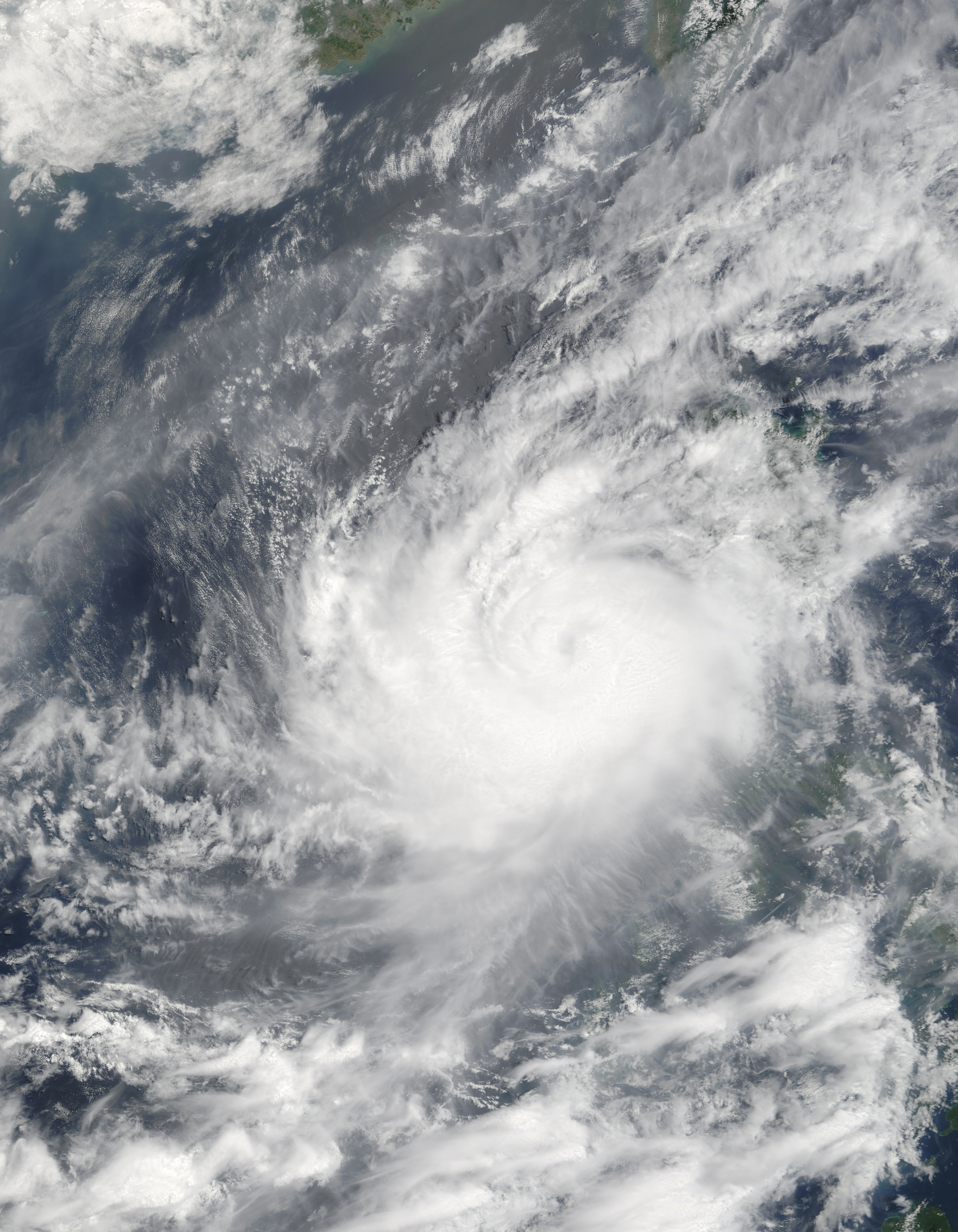
- Severe Tropical Storm Halong near peak intensity on May 17

Meteorological history
- Formed: May 14, 2008
- Extratropical: May 20, 2008
- Dissipated: May 23, 2008

Severe tropical storm
- 10-minute sustained (JMA)
- Highest winds: 110 km/h (70 mph)
- Lowest pressure: 970 hPa (mbar); 28.64 inHg

Category 1-equivalent typhoon
- 1-minute sustained (SSHWS/JTWC)
- Highest winds: 140 km/h (85 mph)
- Lowest pressure: 967 hPa (mbar); 28.56 inHg

Overall effects
- Fatalities: 61 (51 direct, 10 indirect)
- Missing: 3
- Damage: $100 million (2008 USD)
- Areas affected: Philippines and Japan
- IBTrACS
- Part of the 2008 Pacific typhoon season

Severe Tropical Storm Halong, (Note: The name Halong (Vietnamese: Hạ Long, [haː˧˨ʔ lawŋ͡m˧˧]) was contributed by Vietnam and refers to Hạ Long Bay in Vietnamese.) known in the Philippines as Typhoon Cosme, was the fourth severe tropical storm named by the Japan Meteorological Agency (JMA), which is the Regional Specialized Meteorological Centre for the Northwestern Pacific Ocean. The Joint Typhoon Warning Center also recognized Halong as the fifth tropical depression, the fourth tropical storm, as well as the third typhoon of the 2008 Pacific typhoon season.

== Meteorological history ==
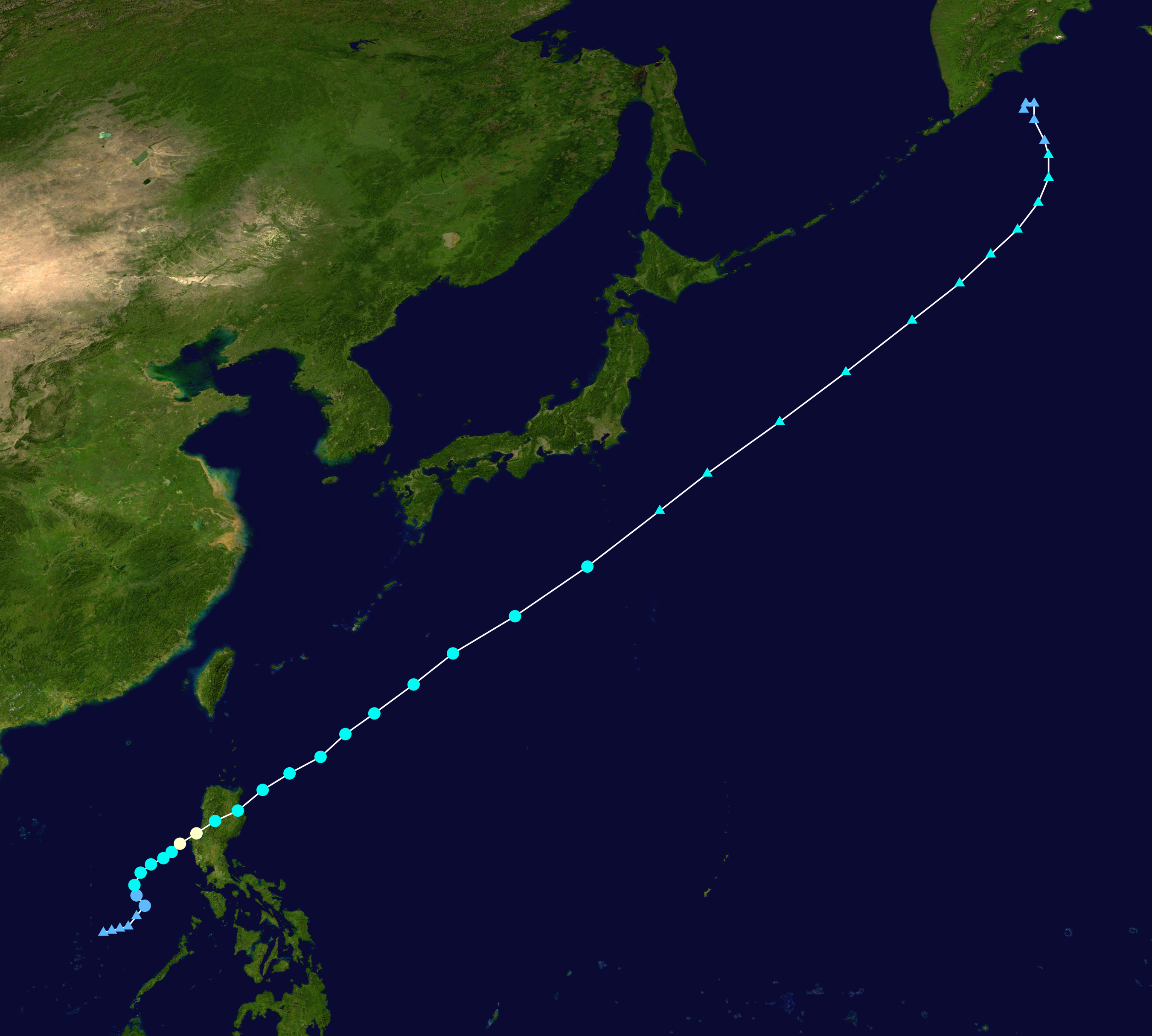
Map plotting the storm's track and intensity, according to the Saffir–Simpson scale Map key Saffir–Simpson scale Tropical depression (≤38 mph, ≤62 km/h) Tropical storm (39–73 mph, 63–118 km/h) Category 1 (74–95 mph, 119–153 km/h) Category 2 (96–110 mph, 154–177 km/h) Category 3 (111–129 mph, 178–208 km/h) Category 4 (130–156 mph, 209–251 km/h) Category 5 (≥157 mph, ≥252 km/h) Unknown Storm type Tropical cyclone Subtropical cyclone Extratropical cyclone, remnant low, tropical disturbance, or monsoon depression

Late on May 13, a tropical disturbance formed in the South China Sea. Early the next day, the Japan Meteorological Agency (JMA) and the Philippine Atmospheric, Geophysical, and Astronomical Services Administration (PAGASA) designated the disturbance as a tropical depression, with PAGASA assigning the local name of Cosme. However the Joint Typhoon Warning Center (JTWC) did not issue a Tropical Cyclone Formation Alert until later that day. The JTWC then designated the depression as 05W on May 15. On May 16, both the JMA and the JTWC upgraded the depression to a tropical storm with the JMA designating it as Tropical Storm Halong and assigning the international number of 0804. This was 12 hours after PAGASA had upgraded it to a tropical storm. During that day Halong kept intensifying and was designated as a severe tropical storm early the next day by the JMA as it reached its peak wind speeds of 60 knots (69 mph; 110 km/h). The JTWC then upgraded Halong to a typhoon with peak wind speeds of 70 knots (81 mph; 130 km/h) which made Halong a Category one typhoon on the Saffir-Simpson Hurricane Scale.

Later on May 17, Halong made landfall on the Philippine region of Pangasinan and travelled towards the northeast over Luzon. While over land Halong weakened into a tropical storm with both the JTWC and the JMA downgrading Halong early the next day. Later that day after reaching the Philippine Sea, Halong started to strengthen and intensify into a severe tropical storm. However, it did not intensify any further, and on May 19, weakened into a tropical storm. Later that day, PAGASA issued their final advisory on Halong, as it moved out of their area of responsibility. The JTWC then issued their last advisory on Halong as it had begun its extratropical transition. The JMA then reported that it had completed its extratropical transition and issued their final advisory on the remnant low of Halong. The remnants of Halong dissipated on May 24.

== Preparations ==
Starting May 15, PAGASA issued Storm Warning Signals for various areas across the Philippines. At 1500 UTC that day Signal Number One was initially issued over northern Palawan, Occidental Mindoro and Lubang Island. At its maximum coverage (at 0930 UTC May 17), Storm Signal Number 3 was issued for Zambales, Pangasinan, La Union, Tarlac, Benguet and Ilocos Sur, Signal Number 2 was for Bataan, Bulacan, Pampanga, Nueva Vizcaya, Nueva Ecija, Quirino, Ifugao, Mt. Province, Kalinga, Abra, Apayao and Ilocos Norte and Signal Number 1 was raised for Lubang Island, Batangas, Cavite, Laguna, Rizal, northern Quezon, Isabela, Aurora, Cagayan, Calayan Island, Babuyan Group of Islands, Batanes and Metro Manila Further on as Cosme (Halong) razed through Northern Luzon, these storm signals were scaled back until the storm reached the Cagayan-Batanes area and the Pacific Ocean proper.

== Impact ==
=== Philippines ===
In Luzon, the typhoon caused 58 deaths and US$94 million in damage. The storm destroyed 43,365 houses and damaged 188,830 more. Most of the damages reported were in Northern Luzon. Meanwhile, Mindoro and Panay islands were also affected as the storm-induced southwest monsoon brought rains and floods to those areas. In particular, a ferry in Mindoro was stranded as Cosme (still a tropical depression at that time) passed close enough to Mindoro on the night of May 15. The Subic-Olongapo area, one of the economic zones of the Philippines, experienced power outages as the storm got closer to Zambales on May 17. The province of Pangasinan, where the storm made its landfall, experienced waist-high floods and power outages as well. Even the city of Dagupan (in Pangasinan) suffered the same fate with even stranded persons all over the city due to flooding. The town of Sta. Cruz in Zambales had about 7,000 people homeless due to Cosme. Overall, the hardest hit were Pangasinan and Zambales provinces. Because the damage caused by the storm in Zambales is extensive even in infrastructure, repair was forced to be done on schools there as that time, classes are to resume in the next few weeks. The storm also increased the prices of vegetables in Metro Manila, as the latter gets most of its vegetables from Northern Luzon. Many places were flooded like what happened from Typhoon Ketsana.

According to the final report on Cosme (Halong) released by the National Disaster Coordinating Council, 61 were reported killed, 33 wounded and three were left missing. People affected by Cosme numbered 1,496,635 persons in 1,510 barangays in five provinces. Damages to property totaled to PHP 4.712 billion, of PHP 3.721 billion were agricultural losses and PHP 992 million were destroyed infrastructure. Pangasinan was the most damaged province as indicated by the report.

In June 2012, PAGASA retired the name Cosme from its naming lists. The name was replaced by Carina and was first used in the 2012 season.

=== Japan ===
The extratropical remnants of Halong brought heavy rains to parts of Japan, injuring one person.

== See also ==
- Other tropical cyclones named Halong
- Other tropical cyclones named Cosme
- Tropical cyclones in 2008
- List of Philippine typhoons (2000–present)
