= List of storms named Leon =

The name Leon has been used for four tropical cyclones worldwide: two in the Philippine Area of Responsibility in the West Pacific Ocean and two in the Australian region. Leon has also been used for one European windstorm.

In the West Pacific, where it replaced Lawin on the naming lists:

- Tropical Storm Noul (2020) (T2011, 13W, Leon) – made landfall in Vietnam, killing six people there and twelve in Cambodia.
- Typhoon Kong-rey (2024) (T2421, 23W, Leon) – a Сategory 5-equivalent super typhoon that became the first typhoon to make landfall in Taiwan after mid-October.

The name Leon was retired following the 2024 season and was replaced with Lekep. (Note: Lekep means fog in Maranao.)

In the Australian region:

- Cyclone Leon (1989) – a Category 1 tropical cyclone that later became Cyclone Hanitra in the South-West Indian Ocean.
- Cyclone Leon (2000) – a Category 3 severe tropical cyclone that later became Cyclone Eline in the South-West Indian Ocean, causing the worst natural disaster in Mozambique in over a century.

In Europe:

- Storm Leon (2023)

== See also ==
Storms with similar names

- Cyclone Leonie (1969) – a Category 1 tropical cyclone in the Australian region.
- Storm Ingrid (2026) – a European windstorm that was named Leonie by the Free University of Berlin.
- Cyclone Leonta (1903) – became the costliest cyclone to affect Townsville at the time.
