= List of storms named Lawin =

The name Lawin has been used for four tropical cyclones in the Philippine Area of Responsibility by PAGASA in the Western Pacific Ocean. The name means hawk in Tagalog.

- Typhoon Megi (2004) (T0415, 18W, Lawin) – moved through the Ryūkyū islands before passing between South Korea and Japan.
- Tropical Depression 14W (2008) (Lawin) – remained far offshore north of Luzon.
- Typhoon Jelawat (2012) (T1217, 18W, Lawin) – struck Japan.
- Typhoon Haima (2016) (T1622, 25W, Lawin) – powerful category 5 super typhoon that made landfall in Peñablanca, Cagayan of the Philippines and in Haifeng County, Shanwei in the Guangdong province of China.

The name Lawin was retired following the 2016 Pacific typhoon season and was replaced with Leon. The name means lion in Tagalog.
