= 1988–89 Australian region cyclone season =

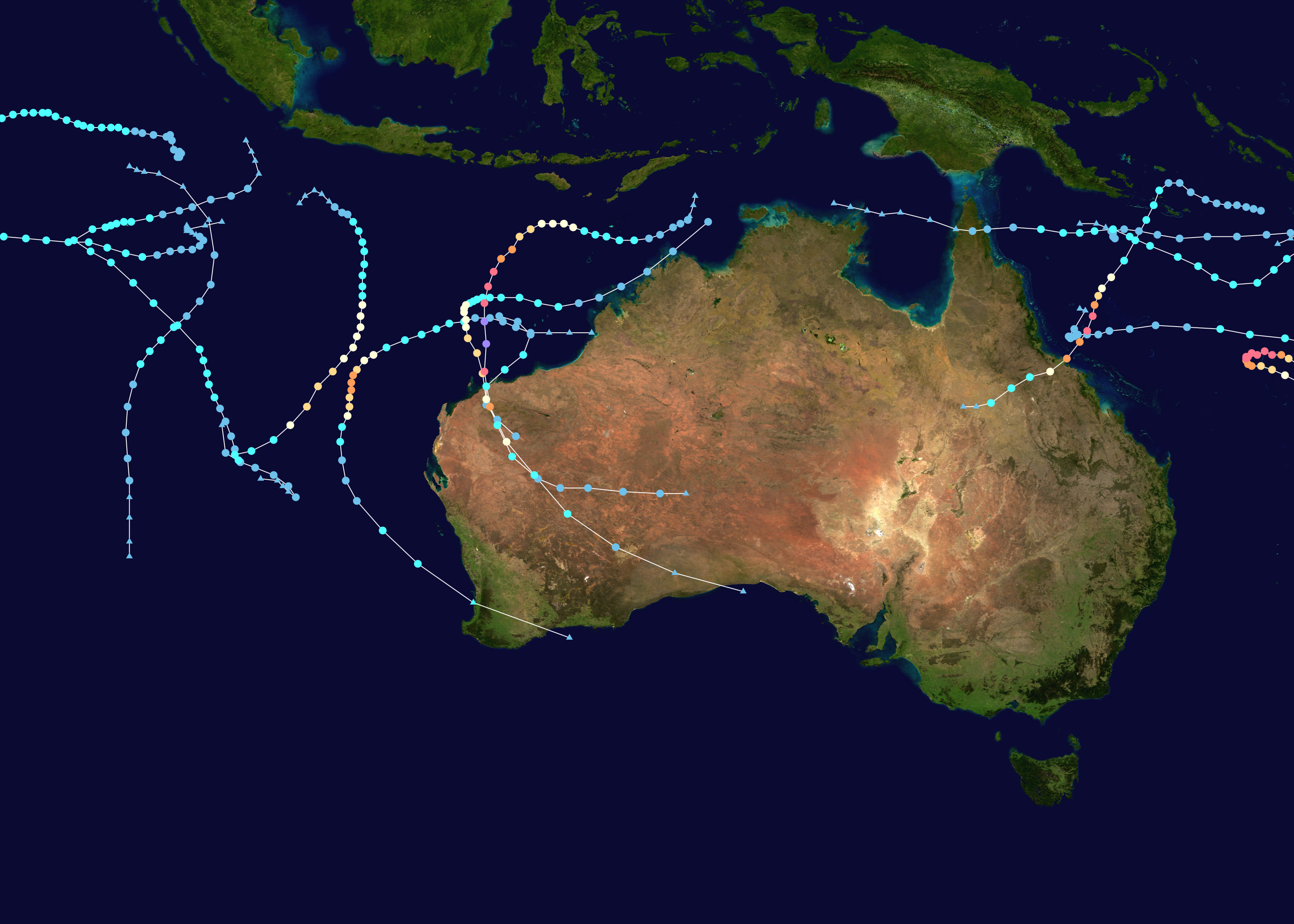
- Season summary map

Seasonal boundaries
- First system formed: 8 November 1988
- Last system dissipated: 12 May 1989

Strongest storm
- Name: Orson
  - Maximum winds: 240 km/h (150 mph) (10-minute sustained)
  - Lowest pressure: 904 hPa (mbar)

Seasonal statistics
- Tropical lows: 14
- Tropical cyclones: 13
- Severe tropical cyclones: 6
- Total fatalities: 6 direct
- Total damage: $93.9 million (1989 USD)

Related articles
- 1988–89 South-West Indian Ocean cyclone season; 1988–89 South Pacific cyclone season

The 1988–89 Australian region cyclone season was a slightly above average tropical cyclone season. It officially started on 1 November 1988, and officially ended on 30 April 1989. The regional tropical cyclone operational plan defines a "tropical cyclone year" separately from a "tropical cyclone season"; the "tropical cyclone year" began on 1 July 1988 and ended on 30 June 1989.

== Systems ==
=== Tropical Cyclone Barisaona ===
- Category 2 tropical cyclone (Australian scale)
- Tropical storm (SSHWS)
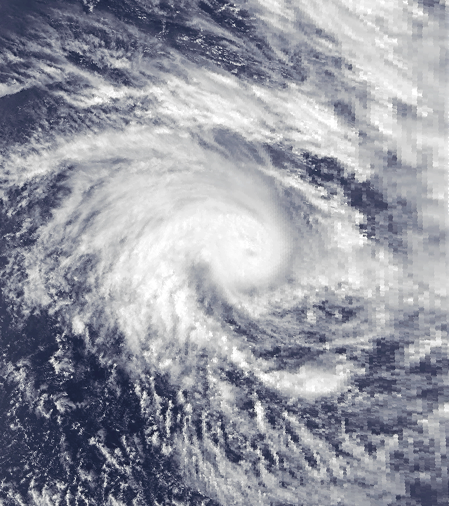
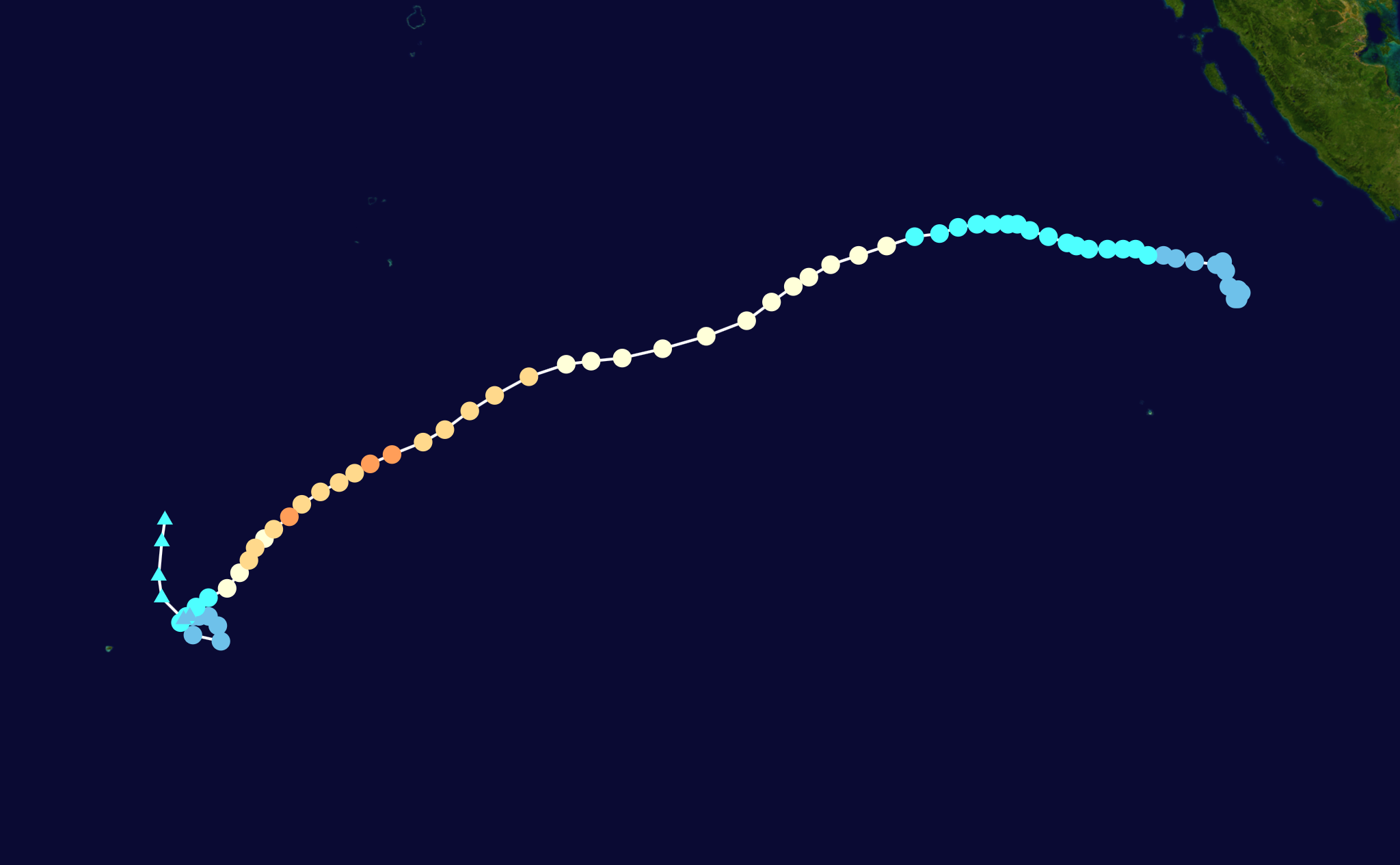
- Duration: 8 November – 11 November (Exited basin)
- Peak intensity: 95 km/h (60 mph) (10-min);

On 5 November, the JTWC started to monitor a tropical disturbance, that was located about 840 km (520 mi) to the southeast of Jakarta, Indonesia. Over the next 24 hours the disturbance remained near stationary before moving slowly towards the north-west over the next few days. The JTWC then initiated advisories on Tropical Cyclone 02S during 8 November, with 1-minute sustained windspeeds equivalent to a tropical storm on the SSHS. During that day while 02S continued to move towards the west, 02S intensified quickly to obtain 1-minute sustained windspeeds of 100 km/h (60 mph). The system continued to move westwards without intensifying any further until it moved into the South-West Indian Ocean during 11 November where it was named Barisaona, by the Mauritius Meteorological service. According to the Reunion Meteorological Service, Barisaona ultimately peaked on 16 November with 10-minute sustained windspeeds of 140 km/h (85 mph), while the JTWC estimated that the cyclone peaked on 17 November with 1-minute windspeeds of 185 km/h (115 mph). The cyclone then dissipated around 23 November.

While Barisaona was in the Australian region TCWC Perth did not monitor it as a named storm. However, when the system was added to their database, it was estimated that while it was in the Australian region it had peaked as a Category 2 tropical cyclone with 10-minute windspeeds of 95 km/h (60 mph).

=== Severe Tropical Cyclone Ilona ===
- Category 3 severe tropical cyclone (Australian scale)
- Category 2 tropical cyclone (SSHWS)
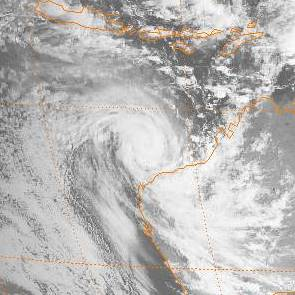
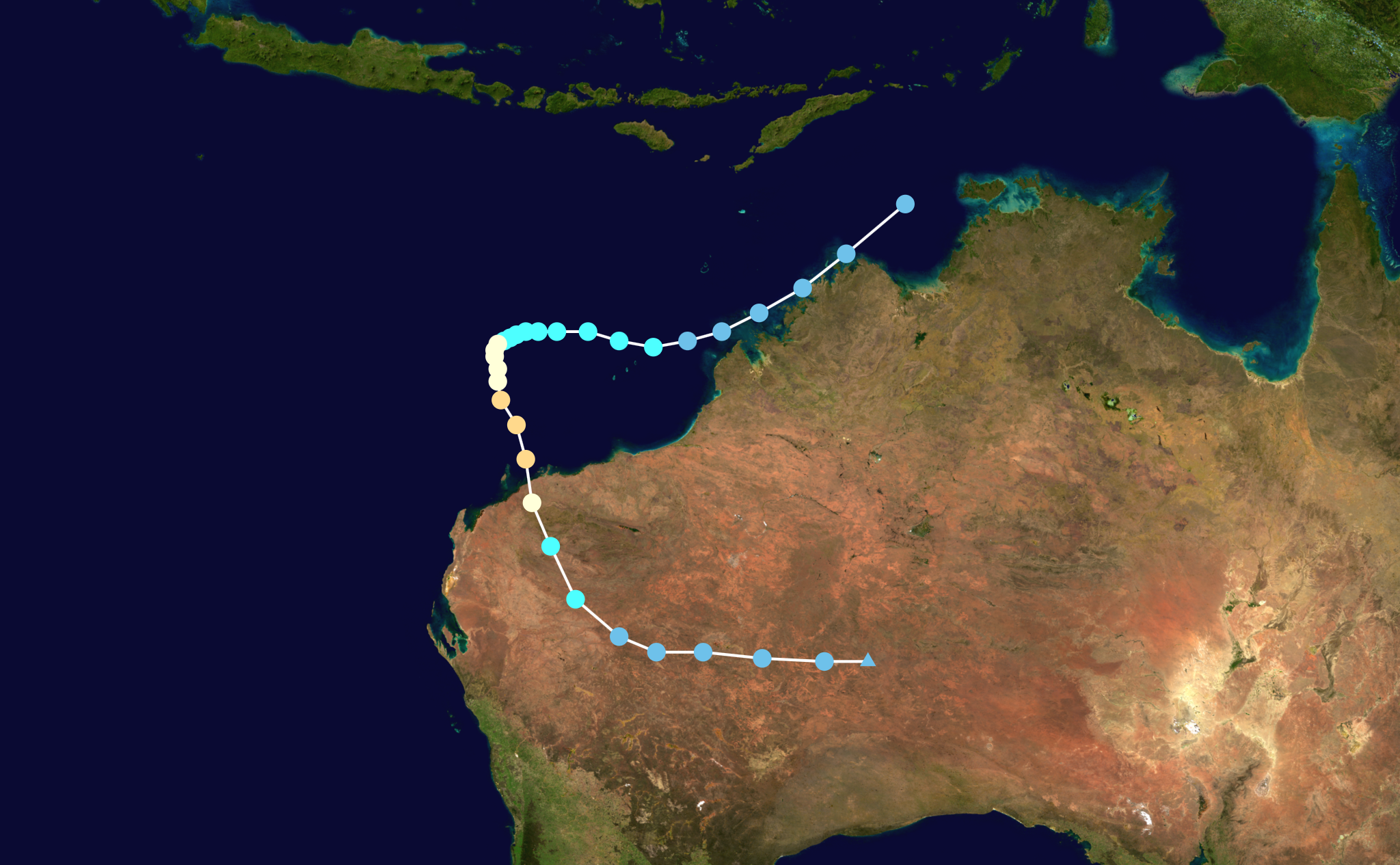
- Duration: 12 December – 19 December
- Peak intensity: 130 km/h (80 mph) (10-min); 960 hPa (mbar)

Ilona developed off the Western Australian coast on 12 December 1988 and made landfall northeast of Onslow, Western Australia on 17 December 1988. Ilona attained a minimum central pressure of 960 mb and maximum wind speed of 85 knots.

=== Tropical Cyclone Delilah ===
- Category 2 tropical cyclone (Australian scale)
- Tropical storm (SSHWS)
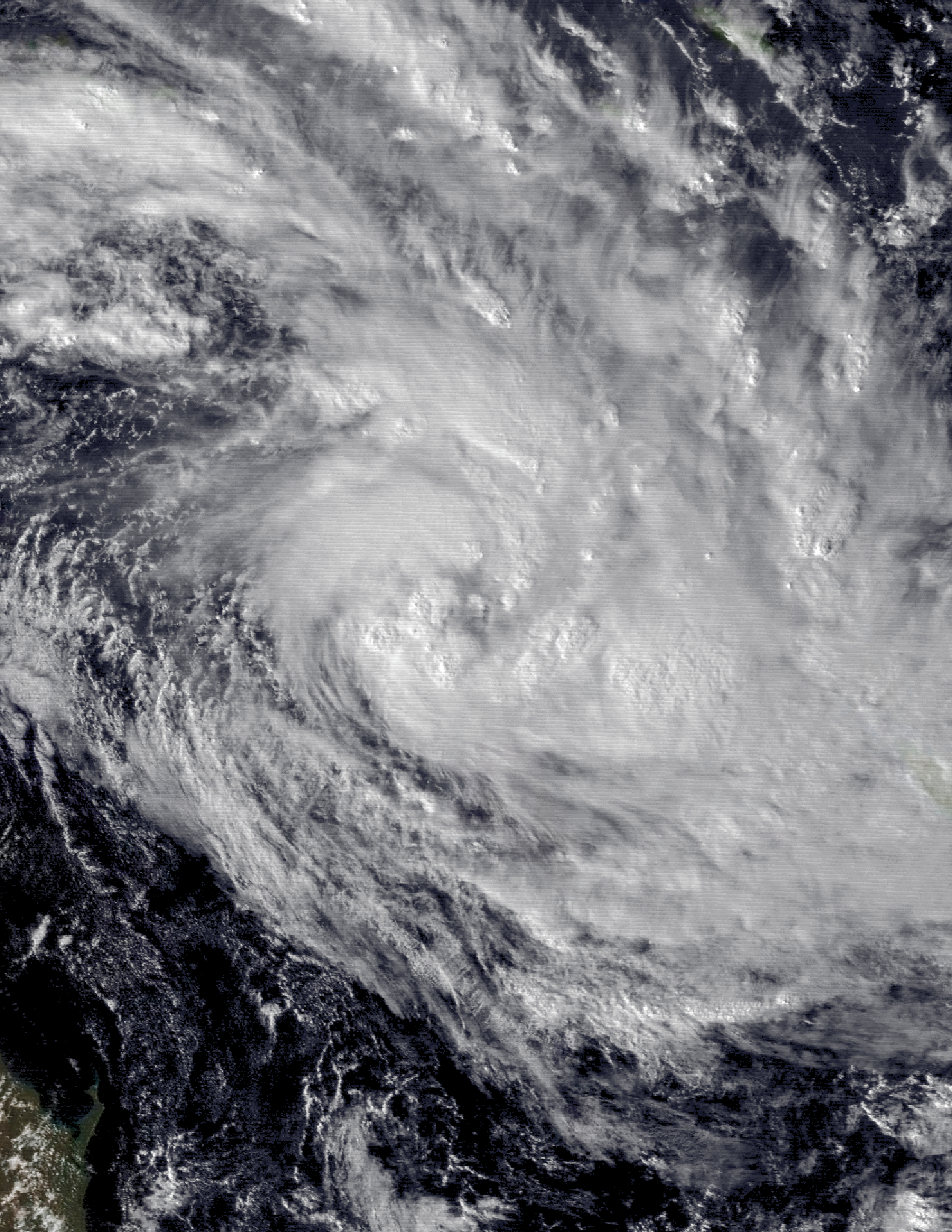
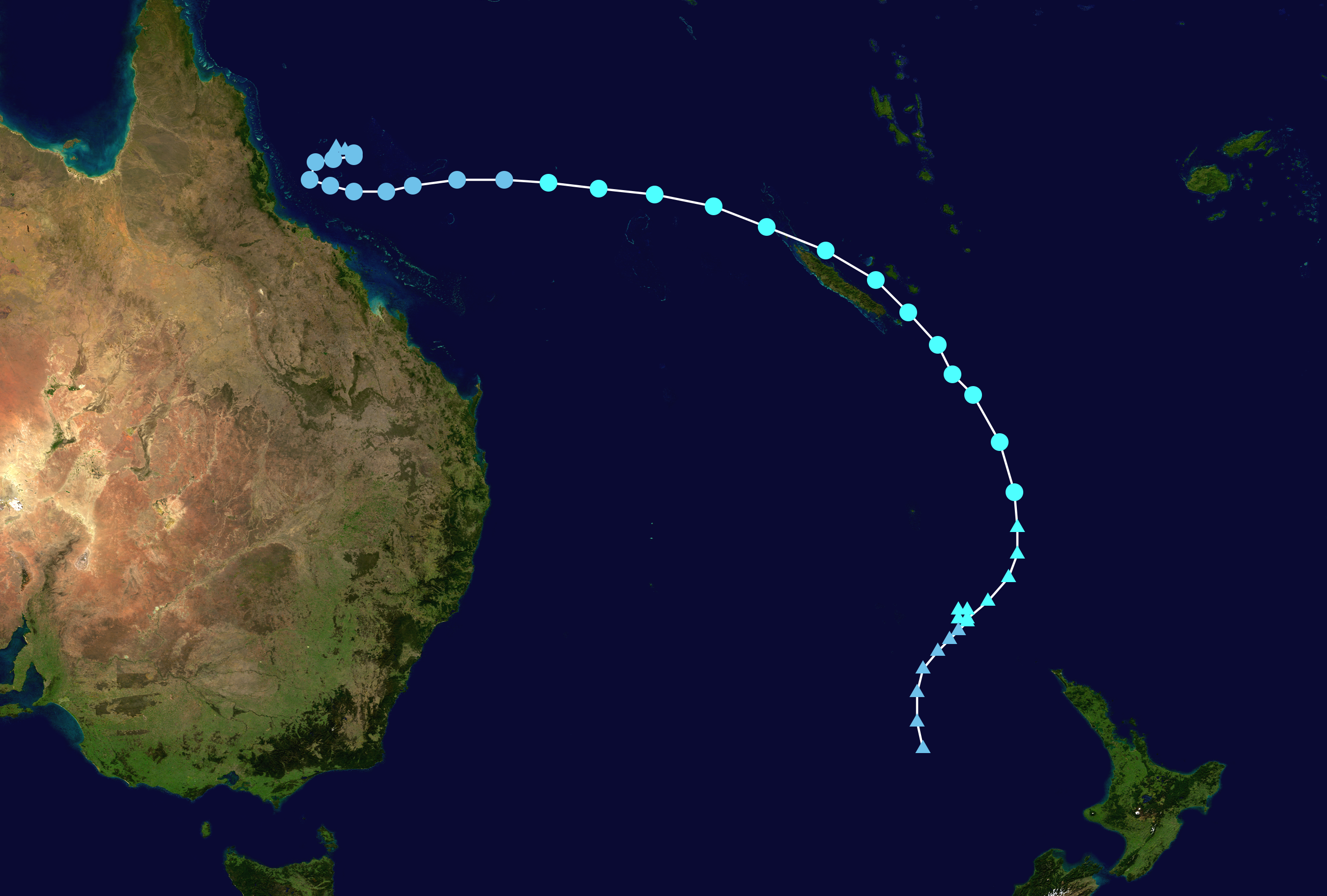
- Duration: 28 December – 1 January (Exited basin)
- Peak intensity: 100 km/h (65 mph) (10-min); 988 hPa (mbar)

The tropical low that was to develop into Tropical Cyclone Delilah, was first noted within the South Pacific convergence zone during 28 December to the northeast of Townsville in Queensland, Australia. Over the next few days the system moved eastwards and slowly intensified further before TCWC Brisbane named it Delilah, during 1 January after it had developed into a category 1 tropical cyclone on the Australian scale. Later that day as the system started to move south-eastwards it crossed 160°E and moved out of the Australian region into the South Pacific basin.

=== Tropical Cyclone John ===
- Category 1 tropical cyclone (Australian scale)
- Tropical storm (SSHWS)
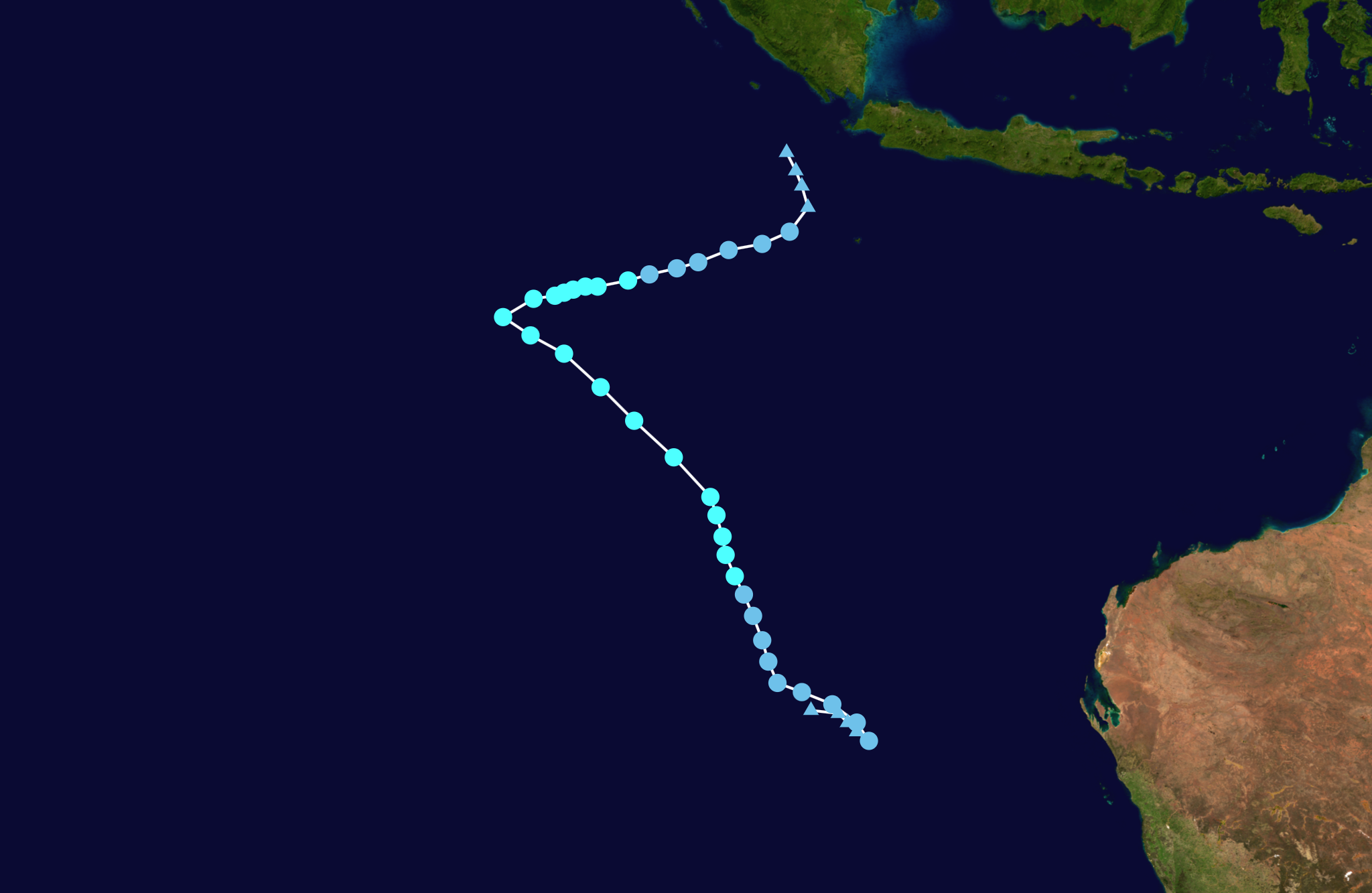
- Duration: 23 January – 2 February
- Peak intensity: 75 km/h (45 mph) (10-min); 990 hPa (mbar)

On 20 January, an area of convection near Sumatra within a monsoon flow became increasingly organised. By 23 January, a low-pressure area developed to the northwest of Christmas Island and the system was classified a tropical low. Initially moving southeast, the system later turned west-southwest on 24 January. Two days later, the system passed just 20 km (12 mi) north of the Cocos Islands, where wind gusts reached 70 km/h (43 mph) and pressures dropped to 999 mb (hPa; 29.50 inHg). After bypassing the islands, the low attained gale-force winds and was named Tropical Cyclone John. The cyclone reached its peak strength on 26 January with winds of 75 km/h (45 mph) and a pressure of 990 mbar (hPa; 29.23 inHg). John's forward motion slowed by this time as it began recurving east and southeast. By 29 January, the accelerating storm struggled to maintain its structure and was left with an exposed circulation. Weakening below cyclone strength that day, John continued over the open waters of the southeast Indian Ocean before completely losing its identity on 2 February well to the west of Australia.

=== Severe Tropical Cyclone Kirrily ===
- Category 3 severe tropical cyclone (Australian scale)
- Category 2 tropical cyclone (SSHWS)
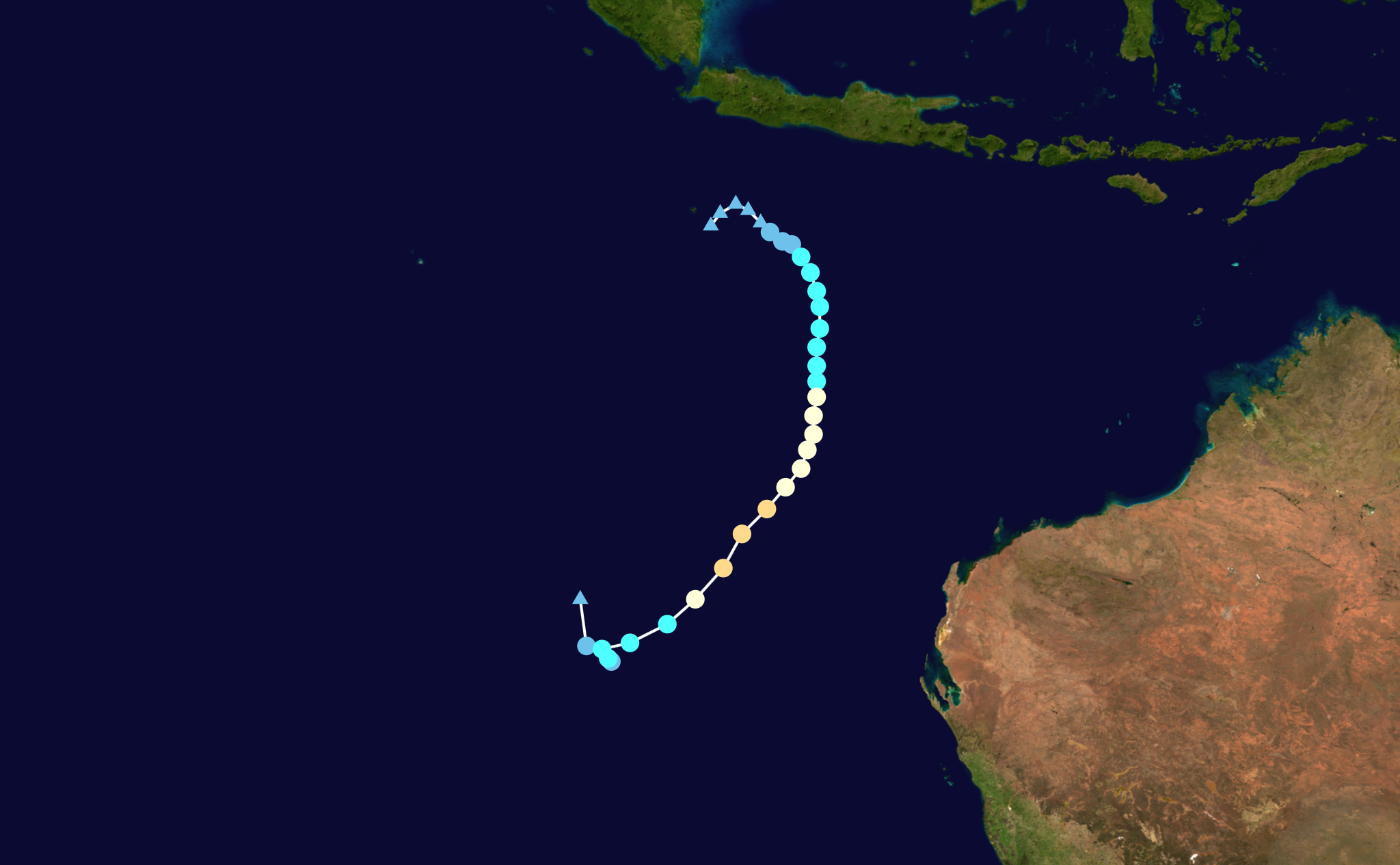
- Duration: 3 February – 11 February
- Peak intensity: 150 km/h (90 mph) (10-min); 955 hPa (mbar)

Severe Tropical Cyclone Kirrily existed from 3 to 11 February.

=== Tropical Cyclone Leon–Hanitra ===
- Category 1 tropical cyclone (Australian scale)
- Tropical storm (SSHWS)
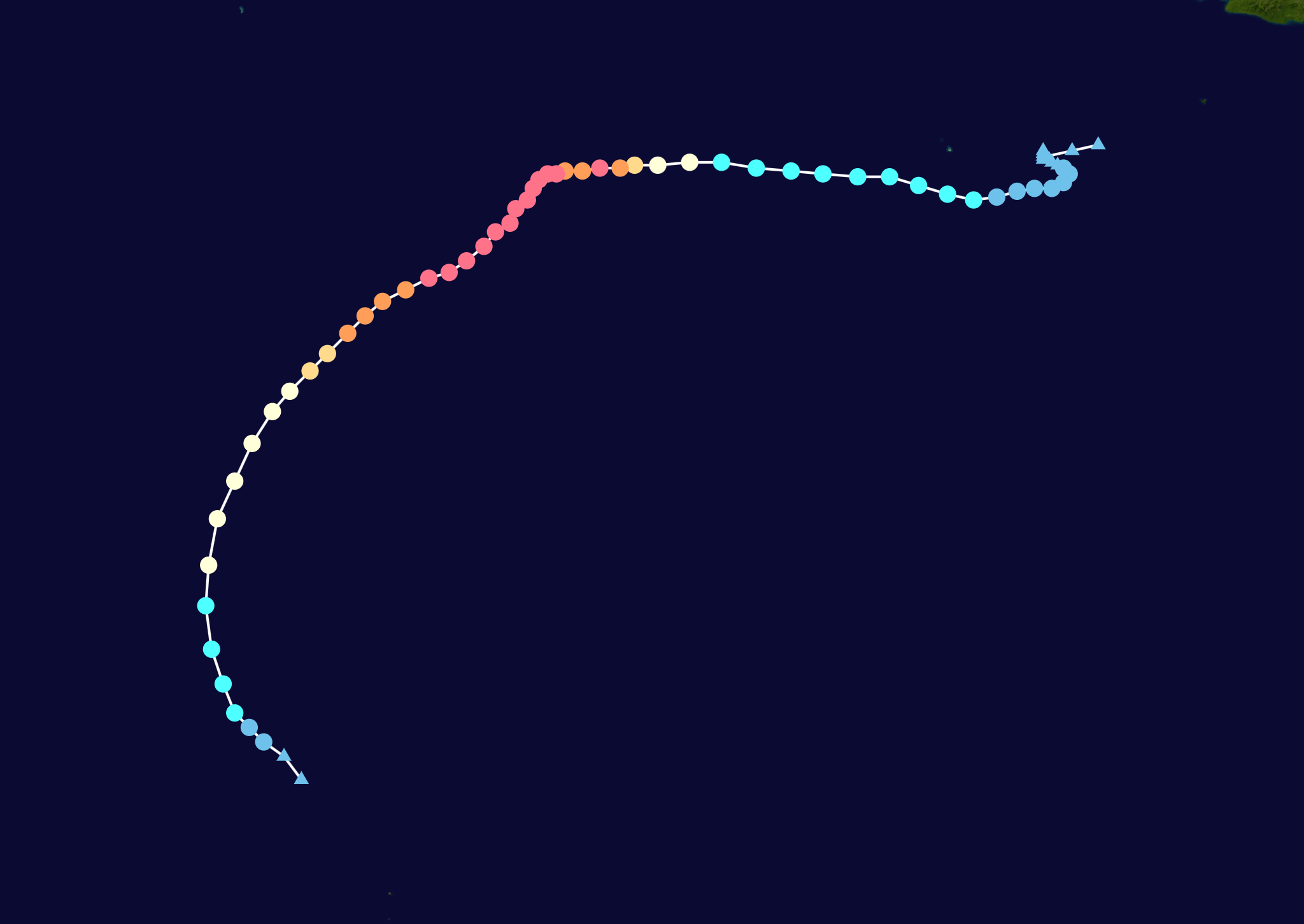
- Duration: 13 February – 19 February (Exited basin)
- Peak intensity: 85 km/h (50 mph) (10-min); 988 hPa (mbar)

A weak tropical low formed between the Cocos and Christmas Islands on 13 February. Moving along a slow, generally westward track, the system steadily organised. After passing south of the Cocos Islands on 17 February, where it produced wind gusts up to 45 km/h (28 mph) it reached cyclone strength on 18 February. Steady strengthening ensued as the newly named Leon approached the western bounds of the Australian cyclone region. Before crossing 90°E on 19 February, it attained winds of 85 km/h (55 mph) and a pressure of 988 mb (hPa; 29.18 inHg). Responsibility of warnings was subsequently passed on to the Mauritius Meteorological Service, at which time it was given the name Hanitra. Cyclone Leon–Hanitra ultimately attained peak winds of 150 km/h (95 mph) and a pressure of 940 mb (hPa; 27.76 inHg) before turning south and becoming extratropical.

=== Severe Tropical Cyclone Harry ===
- Category 5 severe tropical cyclone (Australian scale)
- Category 4 tropical cyclone (SSHWS)
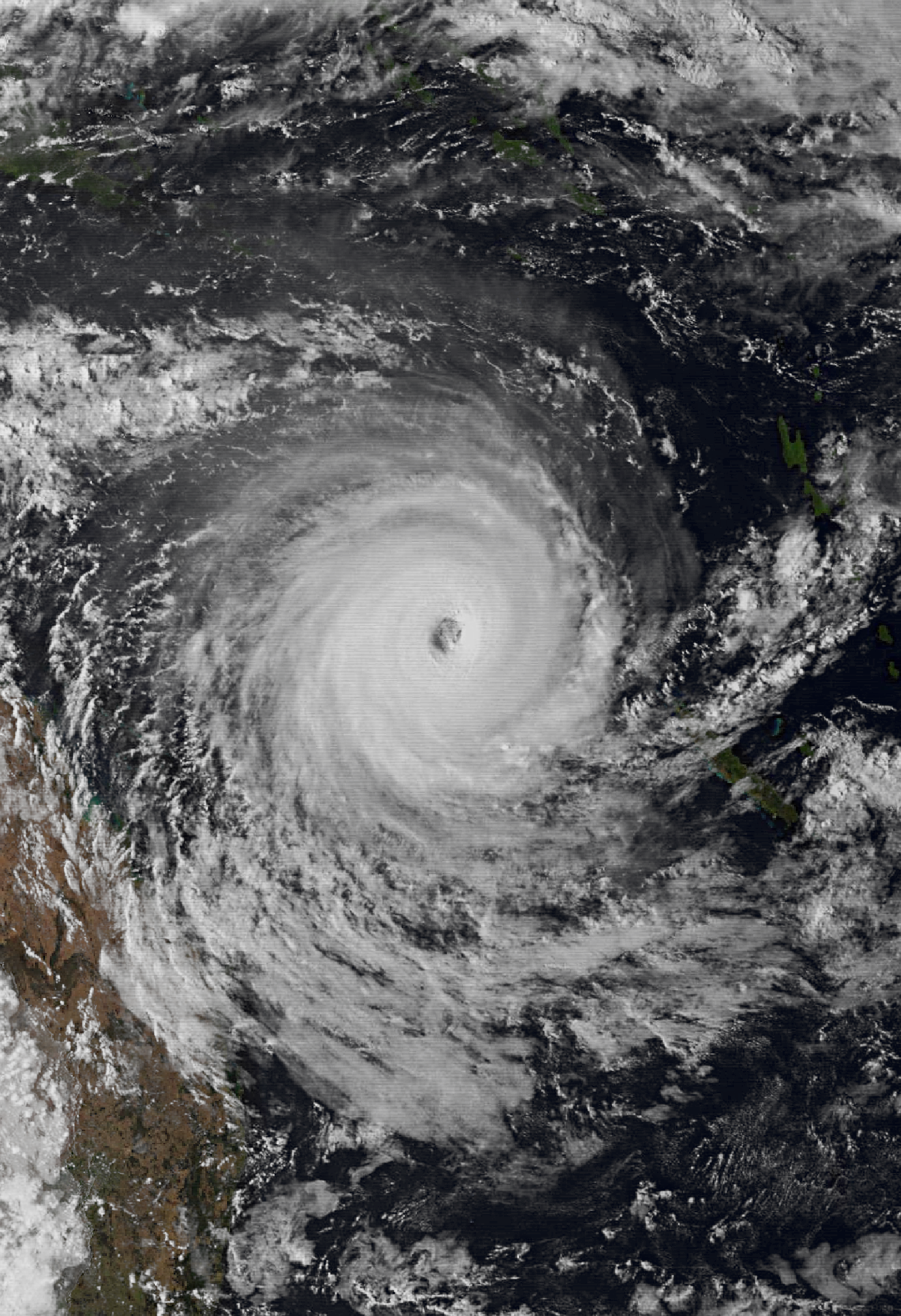
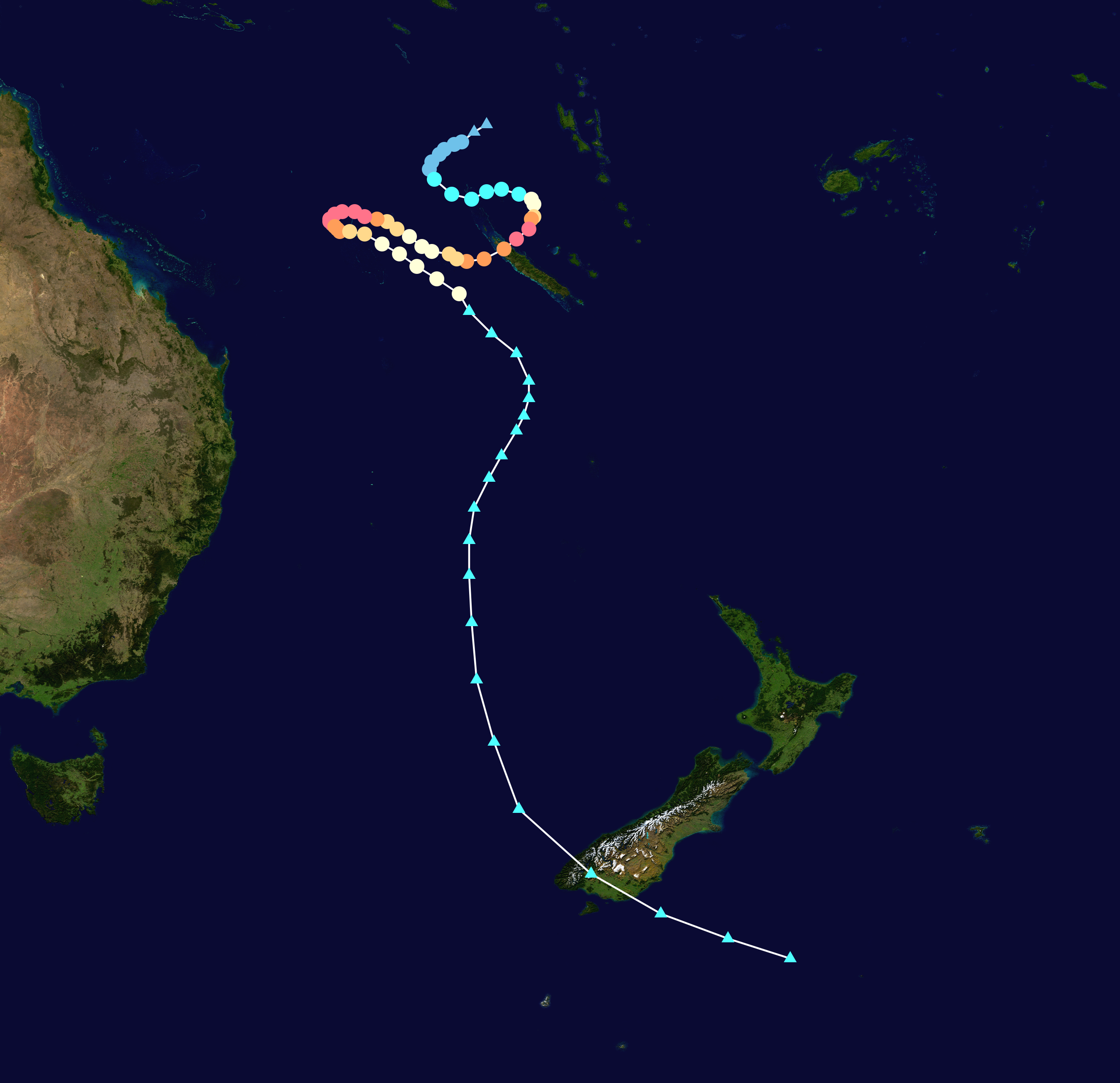
- Duration: 13 February (Entered basin) – 17 February (Exited basin)
- Peak intensity: 205 km/h (125 mph) (10-min); 925 hPa (mbar)

On 7 February, an eastward moving tropical depression developed about 800 km (500 mi) west of Vanuatu. After intensifying to a tropical cyclone the following day, Harry turned southward and further intensified to a severe tropical cyclone before striking New Caledonia on 11 February. After moving back over water, the cyclone turned towards the east-northeast and crossed 160°E, entering the Australian cyclone basin, on 13 February. Harry gradually strengthened over the following two days, ultimately attaining its peak intensity on 15 February with winds of 205 km/h (125 mph) and a minimum pressure of 925 mbar (hPa; 27.32 inHg). Around this time, the cyclone's eye had expanded to 85 km (50 mi) in diameter. Throughout the remainder of 15 February and into the following day, Harry became almost stationary before turning towards the southwest. By 17 February the storm weakened below severe tropical cyclone status before exiting the Australian Basin.

=== Tropical Low 16S ===
- Tropical low (Australian scale)
- Tropical storm (SSHWS)
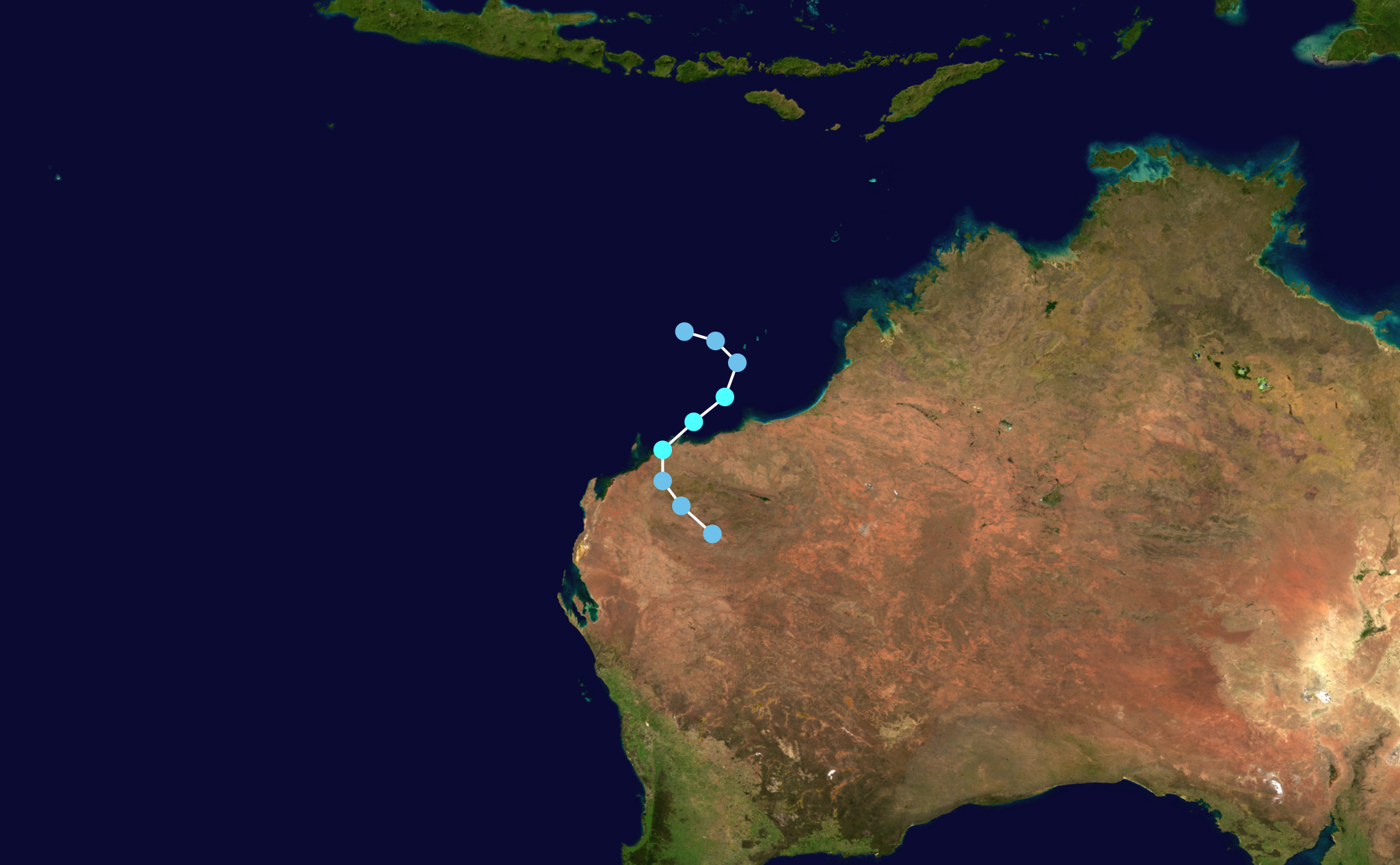
- Duration: 23 February – 25 February
- Peak intensity: 85 km/h (50 mph) (1-min); 989 hPa (mbar)

On 23 February the BoM started to monitor a tropical low that had developed within the monsoon trough about 1,665 km (1,035 mi) to the north of Perth, Western Australia. Over the next day the system moved southwards before it was designated as Tropical Cyclone 16S by the JTWC, as it reached its peak intensity with 1-minute sustained wind speeds of 85 km/h (55 mph). The system subsequently made landfall on Western Australia during 24 February, having nearly become a tropical cyclone on the Australian scale. The system was subsequently last noted over Western Australia during 25 February.

=== Tropical Cyclone Marcia ===
- Category 1 tropical cyclone (Australian scale)
- Tropical storm (SSHWS)
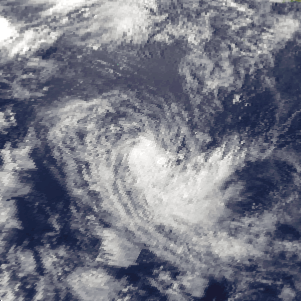
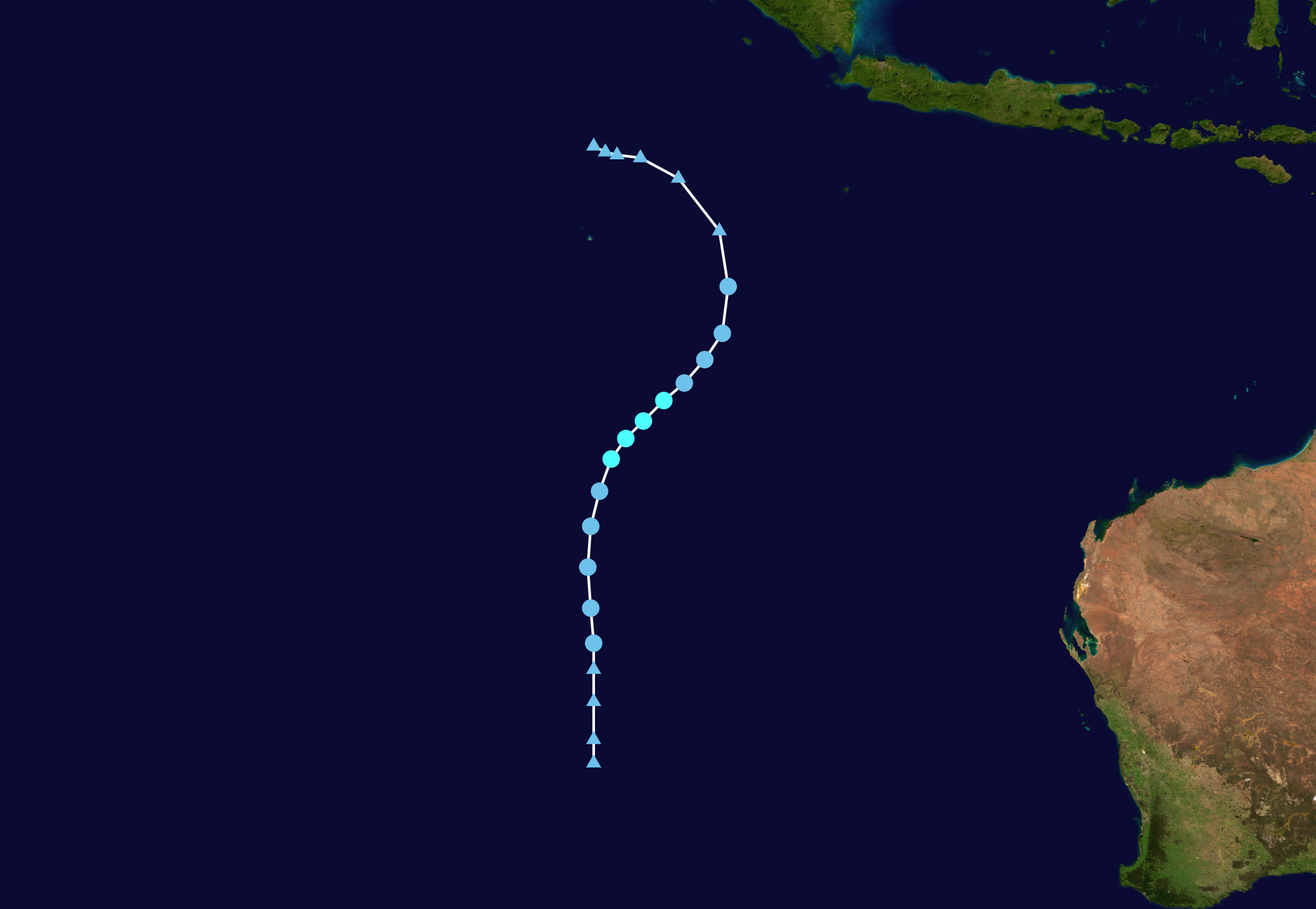
- Duration: 2 March – 5 March
- Peak intensity: 65 km/h (40 mph) (10-min); 995 hPa (mbar)

Tropical Cyclone Marcia existed from 2 to 5 March.

=== Severe Tropical Cyclone Ned ===
- Category 4 severe tropical cyclone (Australian scale)
- Category 3 tropical cyclone (SSHWS)
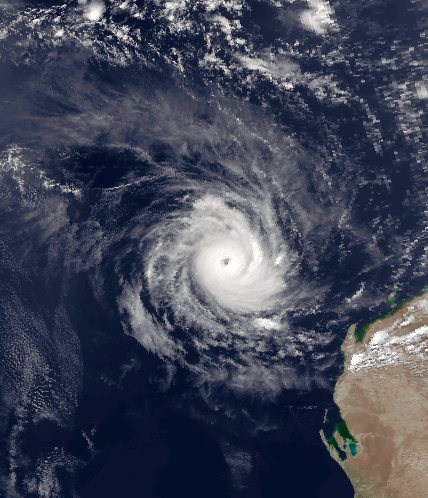
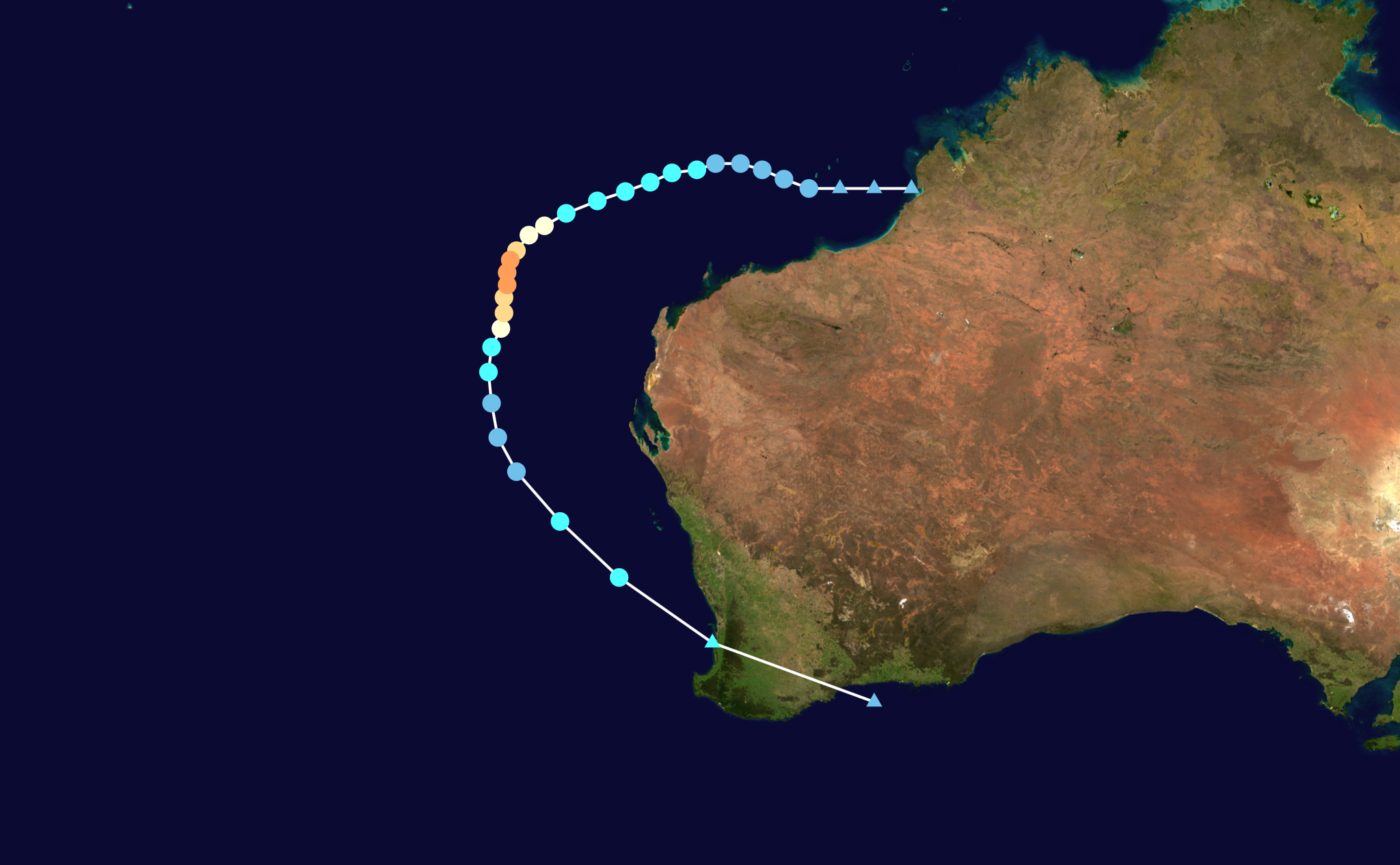
- Duration: 25 March – 1 April
- Peak intensity: 185 km/h (115 mph) (10-min); 941 hPa (mbar)

Occurring between 26 and 31 March 1989, Ned crossed the Western Australian coast near Rockingham on 1 April 1989.

Prior to Ned's landfall, emergency services across Perth, Western Australia were placed on stand-by. Across southwestern Western Australia, Ned brought gusty winds that caused scattered power outages. In the Perth metropolitan area, gusts peaked at 110 km/h (68 mph) and caused some roof damage. Winds in excess of 100 km/h (62 mph) also took place on Rottnest Island and in Fremantle. Possible gales were observed just south of the Perth metro area in Rockingham. High winds in Collie caused a starting pontoon along the Wellington Dam course in the Australian Rowing Championships to sink. This prompted referees at the event to cancel the remainder of the race. The entire King's Cup portion of the championships was abandoned, marking the first time since World War II that it was cancelled. Excluding times of war or depression, it was the first time in the 111 years of the King's Cup that it had been abandoned entirely. Following the storm, the name Ned was retired and will never be used again for an Australian cyclone.

=== Severe Tropical Cyclone Aivu ===
- Category 5 severe tropical cyclone (Australian scale)
- Category 4 tropical cyclone (SSHWS)
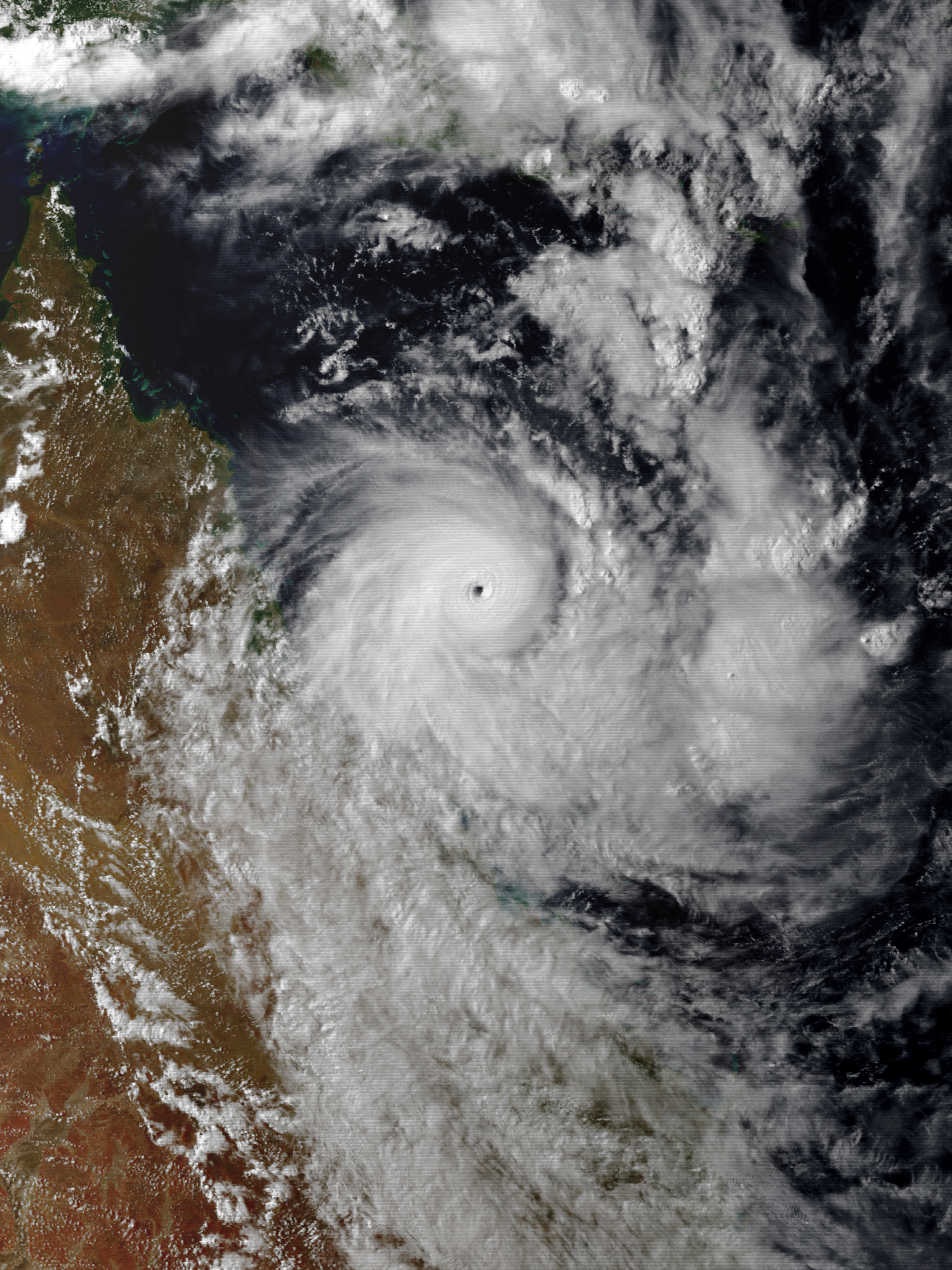
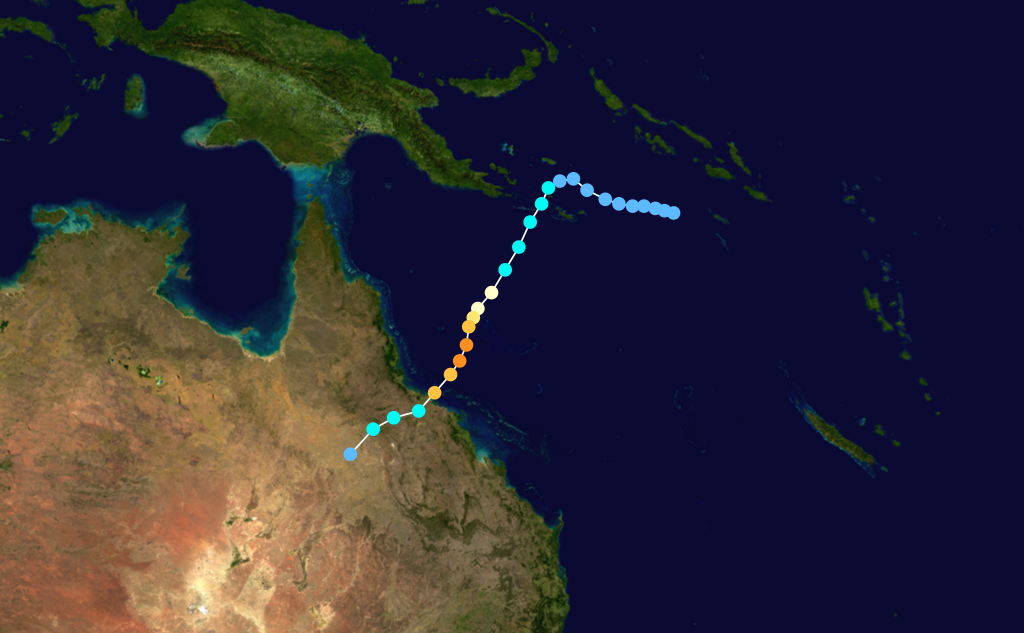
- Duration: 1 April – 5 April
- Peak intensity: 205 km/h (125 mph) (10-min); 935 hPa (mbar)

Aivu made landfall near Ayr, Queensland on 4 April 1989, causing serious damage and killing one person.

=== Severe Tropical Cyclone Orson ===
- Category 5 severe tropical cyclone (Australian scale)
- Category 5 tropical cyclone (SSHWS)
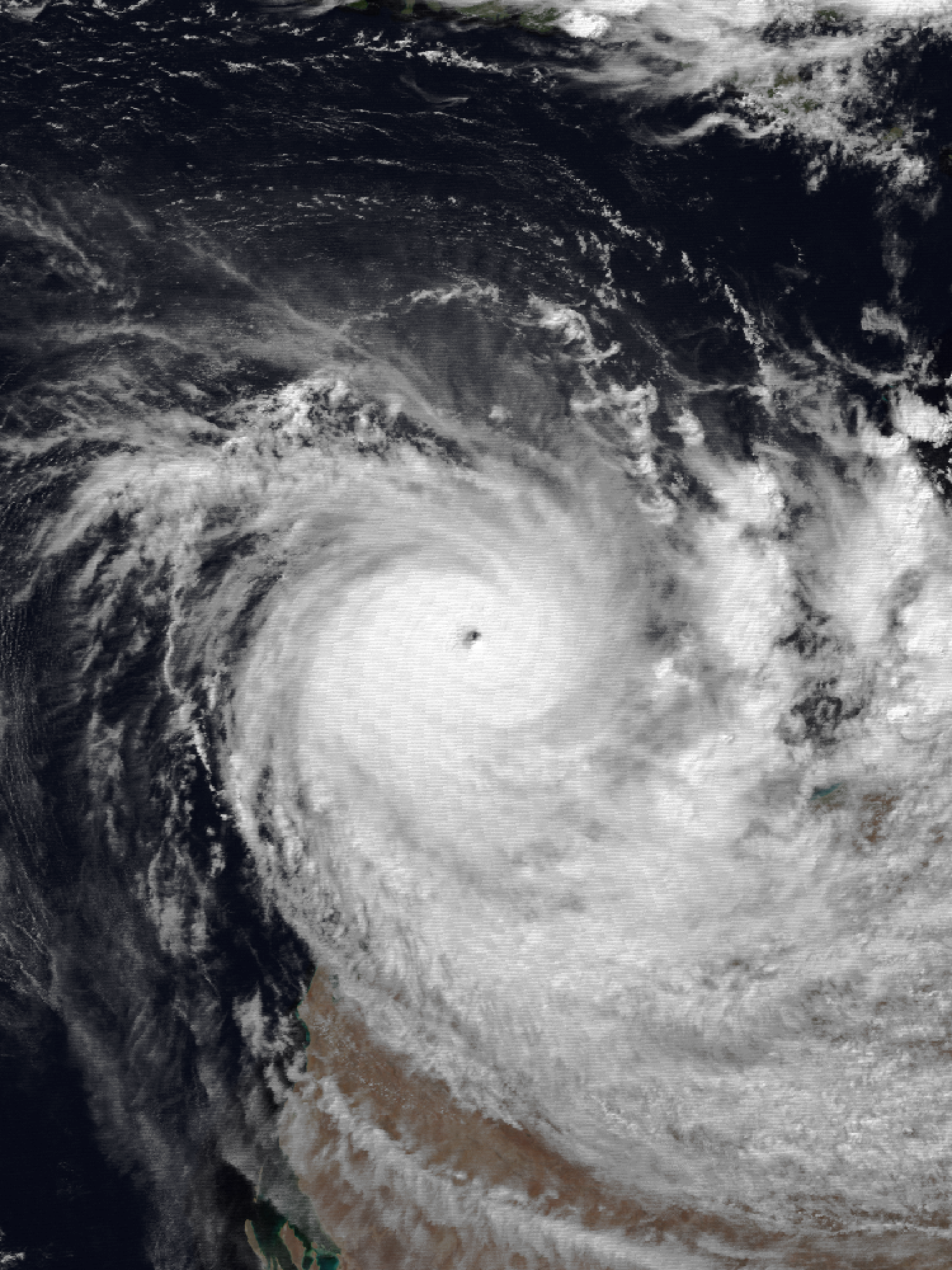
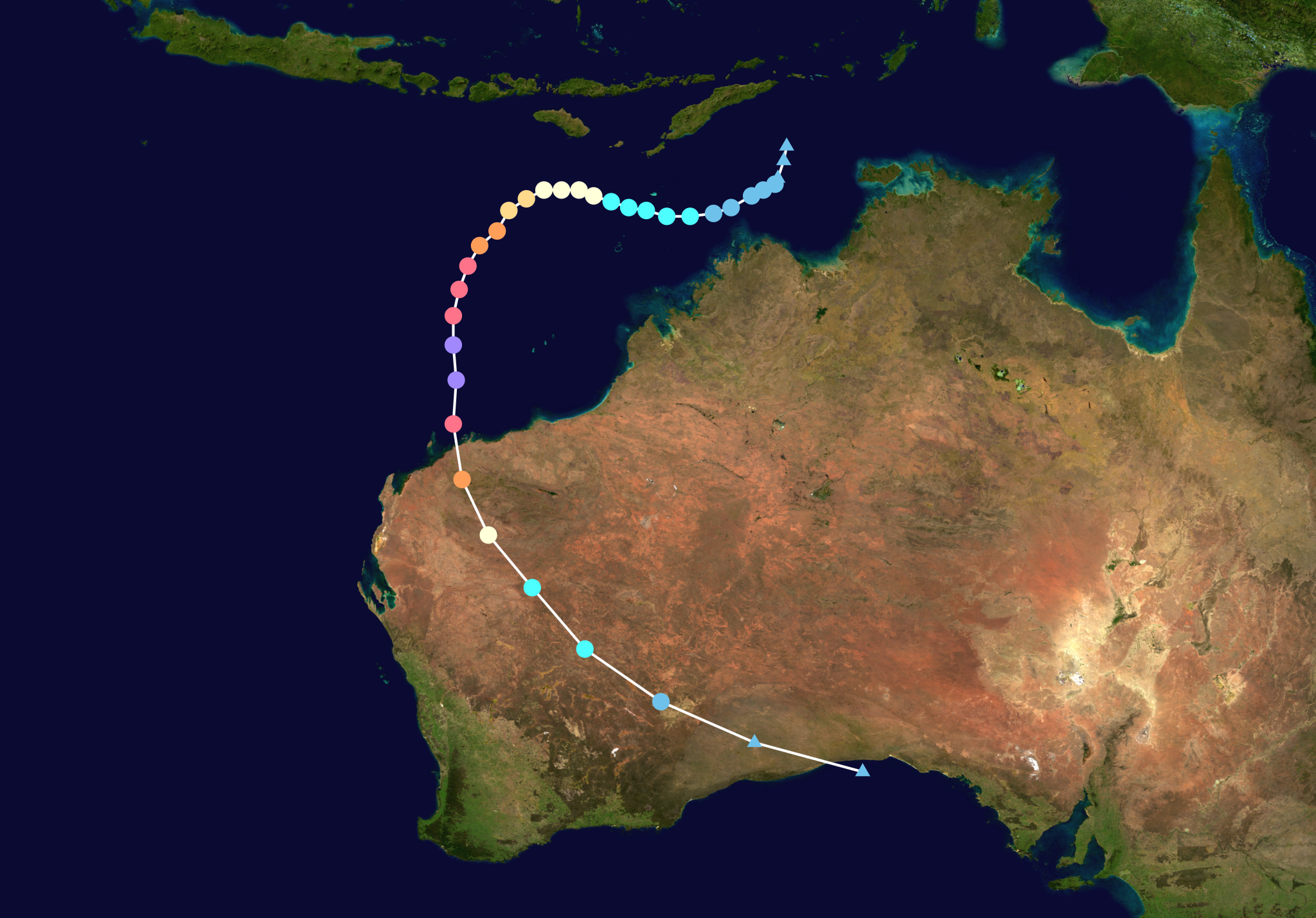
- Duration: 17 April – 24 April
- Peak intensity: 240 km/h (150 mph) (10-min); 904 hPa (mbar)

Forming out of a tropical low on 17 April, Orson gradually intensified as it tracked towards the west. After attaining Category 5 intensity on 20 April, the storm began to track southward and accelerated. The following day, the cyclone reached its peak intensity with winds of 250 km/h (155 mph) and a barometric pressure of 904 hPa (mbar). Orson maintained this intensity for nearly two days before making landfall near Dampier. The cyclone rapidly weakened after landfall as it accelerated to the southeast. After moving into the Great Australian Bight on 24 April, the storm dissipated.

Despite Orson's extreme intensity, damage was relatively minimal as it struck a sparsely populated region of Western Australia. Five people were killed offshore and damages amounted to A$20 million (US$16.8 million). The storm damaged a new gas platform that explored a possible oil field, believed to contain nearly 200 million barrels (32,000,000 m^{3}) of oil. The damage delayed the project for nearly two weeks. The most severe impacts took place in Pannawonica, where 70 homes were damaged. Following the storm, cleanup costs reached A$5 million (US$4.1 million). Due to the severity of the storm, the name Orson was retired after the season.

=== Tropical Cyclone Meena ===
- Category 2 tropical cyclone (Australian scale)
- Tropical storm (SSHWS)
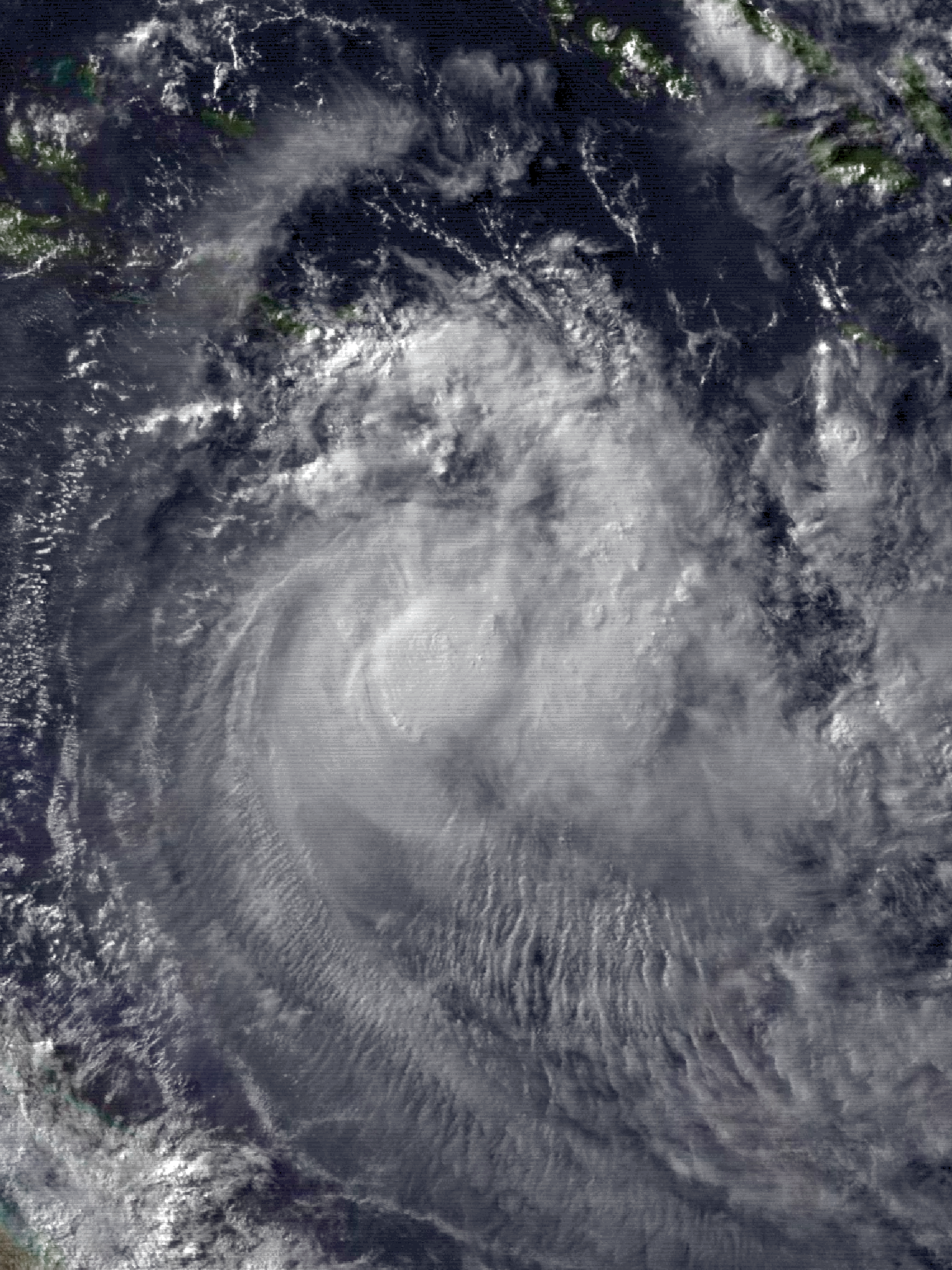
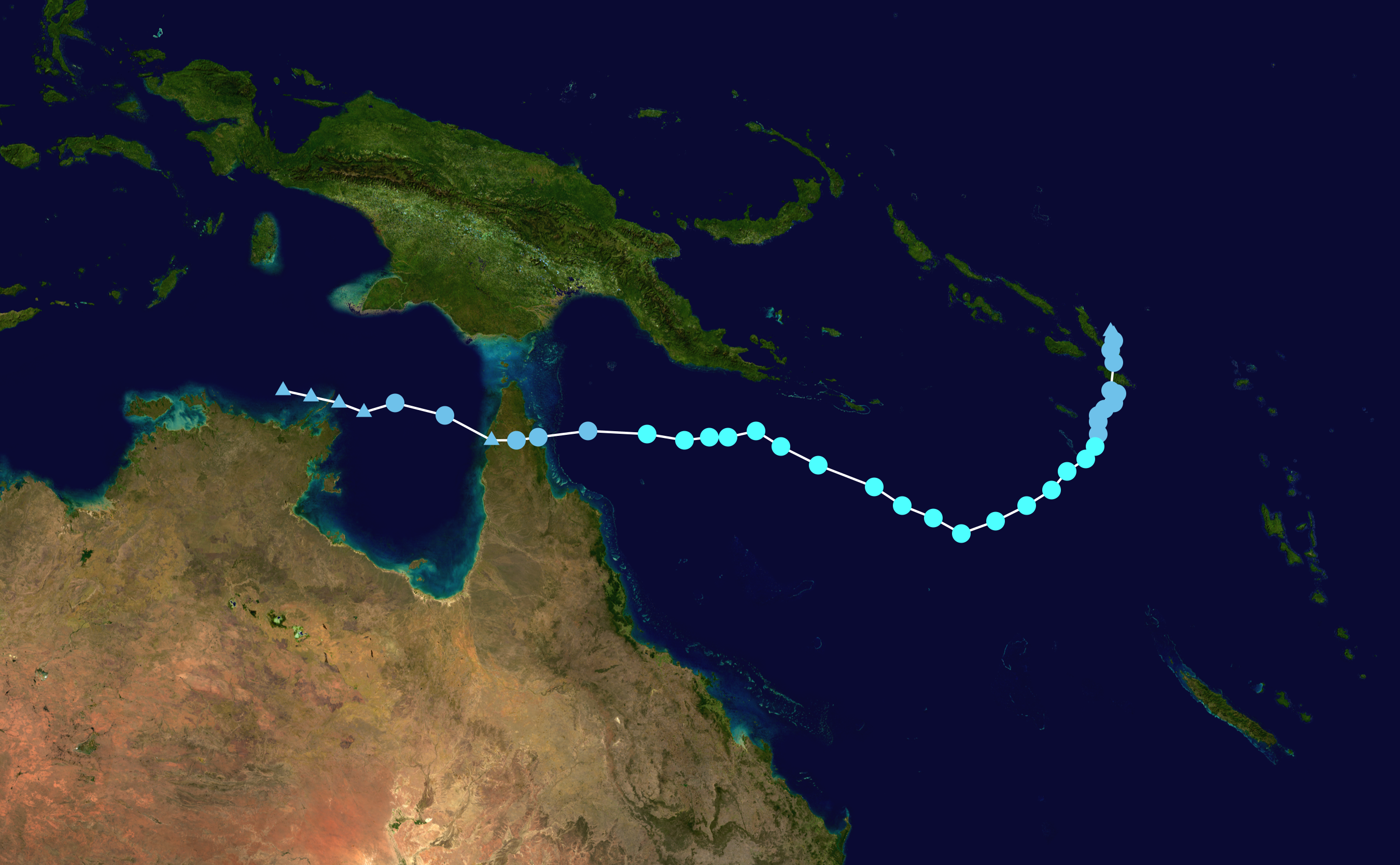
- Duration: 5 May (Entered basin) – 10 May
- Peak intensity: 95 km/h (60 mph) (10-min); 990 hPa (mbar)

On 5 May Tropical Cyclone Meena moved into the Australian region, from the South Pacific region as a category 1 tropical cyclone. During the next day the system continued to move towards the southwest, before the BoM estimated during 6 May that the system had reached its peak intensity with 10-minute sustained wind speeds of 85 km/h (55 mph). At around the same time the JTWC also estimated that the system had peaked as a tropical storm, with 1-minute sustained wind speeds of 95 km/h (60 mph). Over the next couple of days the system weakened as it moved westwards, before it made landfall on the Cape York Peninsula during 9 May. The systems remnants subsequently emerged into the Gulf of Carpentaria, where they dissipated during the following day. There were no reports of any damage to the Cape York Peninsula though it was noted that Meena may have been responsible for some minor damage to the Peninsula.

=== Tropical Cyclone Ernie ===
- Category 1 tropical cyclone (Australian scale)
- Tropical depression (SSHWS)
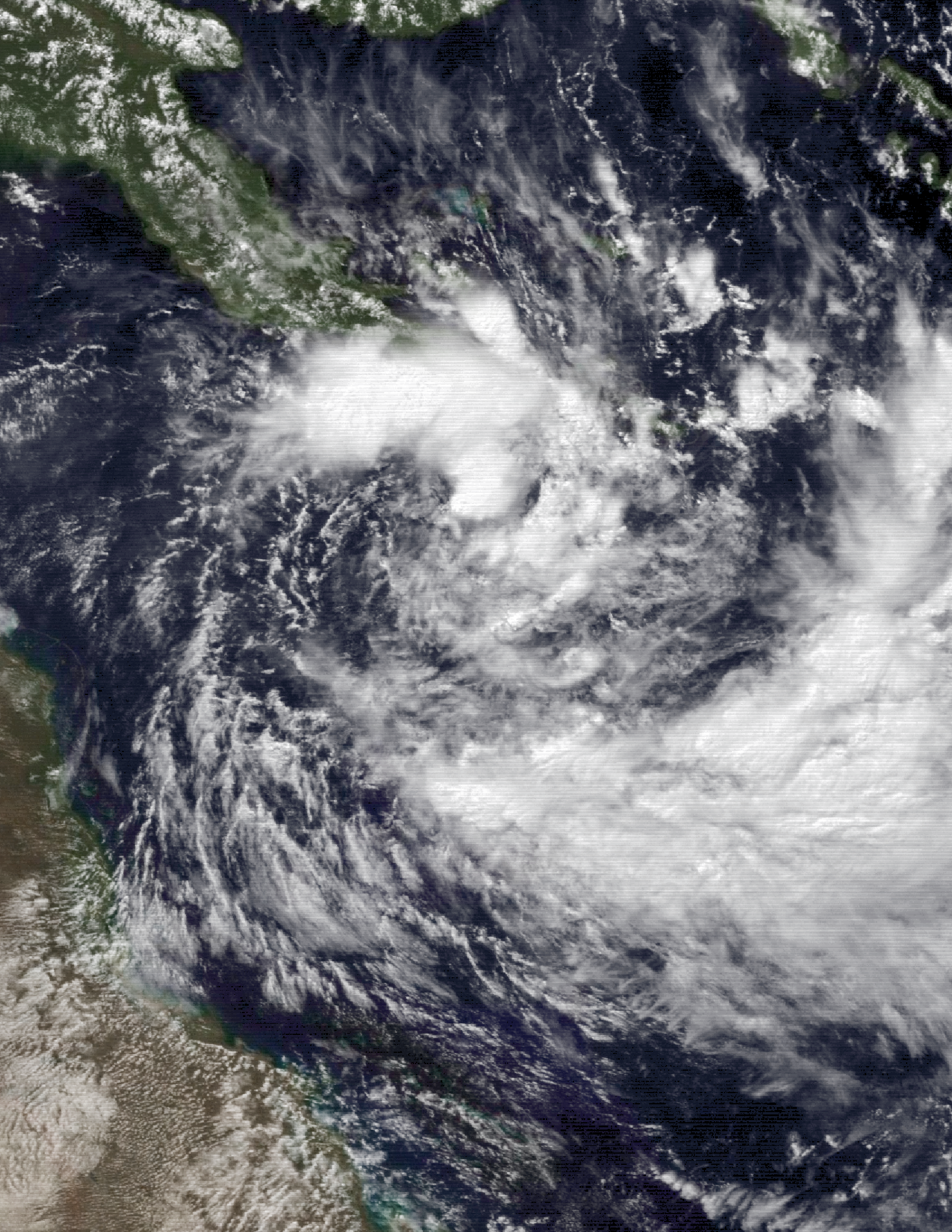
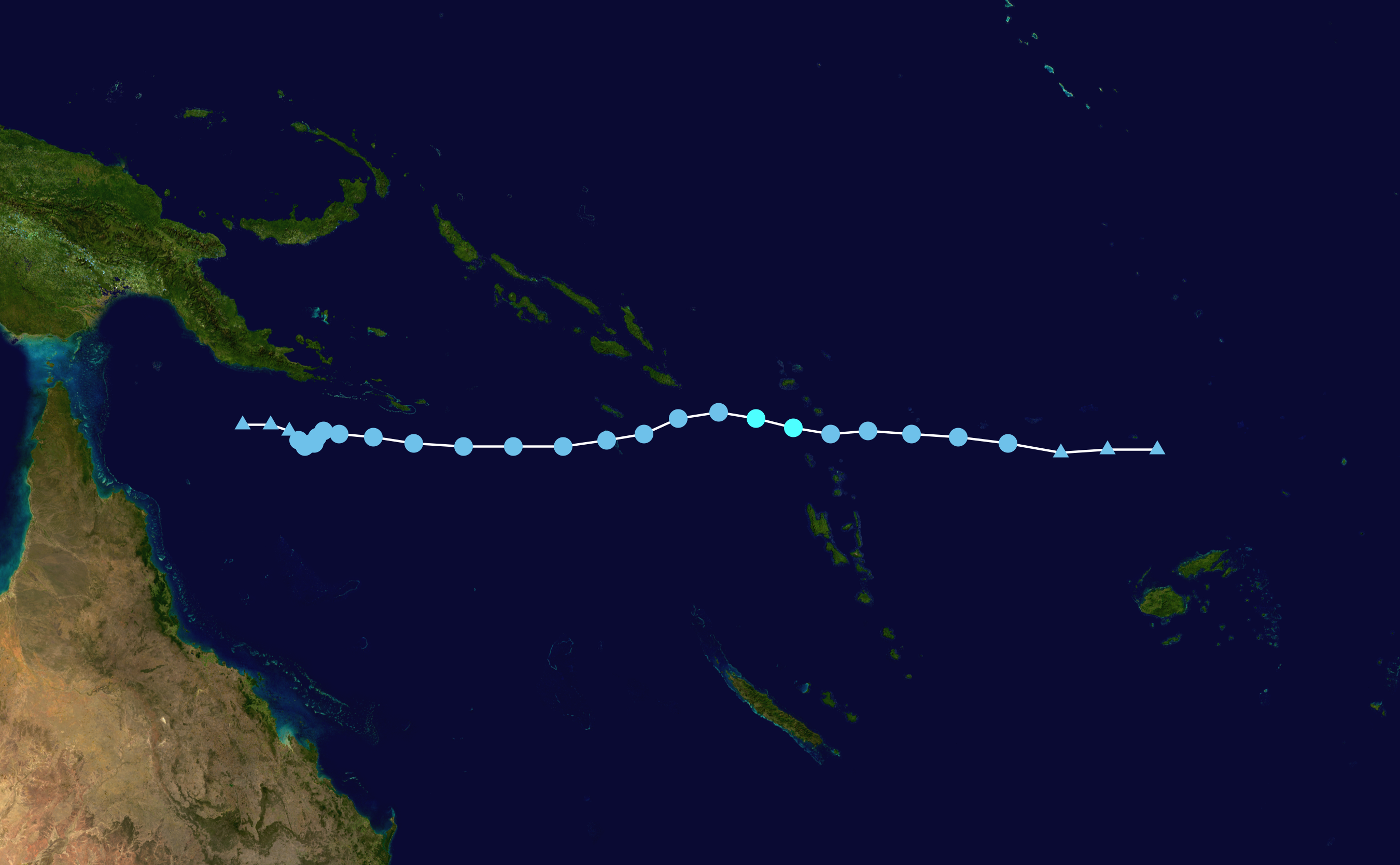
- Duration: 9 May (Entered basin) – 12 May
- Peak intensity: 85 km/h (50 mph) (10-min); 998 hPa (mbar)

Tropical Cyclone Ernie existed from 9 to 12 May.

== Season effects ==
Name	Dates	Peak intensity			Areas affected	Damage (USD)	Deaths	Ref(s).
Name	Dates	Category	Wind speed	Pressure	Areas affected	Damage (USD)	Deaths	Ref(s).
Barisona	5–11 November	Category 2 tropical cyclone	95 km/h (60 mph)	N/A	None	None	None	
Ilona	12–19 December	Category 3 severe tropical cyclone	130 km/h (80 mph)	960 hPa (28.35 inHg)	Western Australia	Unknown	None	
Delilah	28 December – 1 January	Category 2 tropical cyclone	85 km/h (55 mph)	988 hPa (29.18 inHg)	Queensland	None	None	
John	23 – 31 January 1989	Category 1 tropical cyclone	75 km/h (45 mph)	990 hPa (29.23 inHg)	Cocos Island	None	None	
Kirrily	3–11 February	Category 3 severe tropical cyclone	140 km/h (85 mph)	955 hPa (28.20 inHg)	None	None	None	
Leon – Hanitra	13 – 19 February	Category 1 tropical cyclone	85 km/h (50 mph)	988 hPa (29.18 inHg)	None	None	None	
Harry	13–17 February	Category 5 severe tropical cyclone	205 km/h (125 mph)	925 hPa (27.32 inHg)	None	None	None	
16S	23–25 February	Tropical low	Not specified	Not specified	None	None	None	
Marcia	2 – 5 March 1989	Category 1 tropical cyclone	65 km/h (40 mph)	995 hPa (29.38 inHg)	None	None	None	
Ned	25 March – 1 April	Category 4 severe tropical cyclone	165 km/h (105 mph)	941 hPa (27.79 inHg)	Western Australia	Minor	None	
Aivu	1–5 April	Category 5 severe tropical cyclone	175 km/h (110 mph)	935 hPa (27.61 inHg)	Queensland	Unknown	1	
Orson	17–25 April	Category 5 severe tropical cyclone	240 km/h (150 mph)	904 hPa (26.70 inHg)	Western Australia, South Australia	$16.8 million	5	
Meena	5–10 May	Category 2 tropical cyclone	85 km/h (55 mph)	990 hPa (29.23 inHg)	Cape York Peninsula, Queensland, Northern Territory	None	None	
Ernie	9 – 13 May 1989	Category 1 tropical cyclone	85 km/h (50 mph)	998 hPa (29.47 inHg)	Vanuatu, Solomon Islands, Papua New Guinea	Unknown	Unknown	
Season aggregates
14 systems	5 November – 12 May		250 km/h (155 mph)	904 hPa (26.70 inHg)		>$16.8 million	6	

== See also ==
- Atlantic hurricane seasons: 1988, 1989
- Pacific hurricane seasons: 1988, 1989
- Pacific typhoon seasons: 1988, 1989
- North Indian Ocean cyclone seasons: 1988, 1989
